= 1947 Merchant Marine Mariners football team =

American college football season

1947 Merchant Marine Mariners football
- Conference: Independent
- Record: 2–9
- Head coach: Bill Reinhart (2nd season)
- Home stadium: Tomb Memorial Field

1947 Eastern major college football independents records
	Conf.			Overall
Team	W	L	T	W		L		T
No. 4 Penn State		–		9	–	0	–	1
No. 11 Army		–		5	–	2	–	2
Villanova		–		6	–	3	–	1
Boston University		–		5	–	3	–	0
Boston College		–		5	–	4	–	0
Holy Cross		–		4	–	4	–	2
Syracuse		–		3	–	6	–	0
Temple		–		3	–	6	–	0
NYU		–		2	–	5	–	1
Colgate		–		1	–	5	–	2
Duquesne		–		2	–	8	–	0
Fordham		–		1	–	6	–	1
Merchant Marine		–		2	–	9	–	0
Pittsburgh		–		1	–	8	–	0
Rankings from AP Poll

The 1947 Merchant Marine Mariners football team was an American football team that represented the United States Merchant Marine Academy at Kings Point, New York, during the 1947 college football season. In its second season under head coach Bill Reinhart, the team compiled a 2–9 record and was outscored by a total of 283 to 100. In addition to being the head coach, Reinhart was a commander in the United States Merchant Marine and served as the academy's athletic director. The team played its home games at Tomb Memorial Field.

== Schedule ==
Date	Opponent	Site	Result	Attendance	Source
September 20	at Villanova	Villanova Stadium; Villanova, PA	L 0–60	10,000	
September 27	at Yale	Yale Bowl; New Haven, CT	L 13–34	18,000	
October 4	Colgate	Tomb Memorial Field; Great Neck, NY	L 0–29	8,000	
October 11	at St. Bonaventure	Forness Stadium; Olean, NY	L 0–25	6,500	
October 18	Adelphi	Tomb Memorial Field; Great Neck, NY	W 46–0	4,800	
October 25	Fordham	Tomb Memorial Field; Great Neck, NY	L 0–12	9,000	
November 8	at Lehigh	Taylor Stadium; Bethlehem, PA	L 6–20	5,000	
November 11	Brooklyn	Tomb Memorial Field; Great Neck, NY	W 22–14	5,000	
November 15	at Boston University	Fenway Park; Boston, MA	L 6–33	1,987	
November 22	at Hofstra	Hempstead, NY	L 7–16		
November 27	at George Washington	Griffith Stadium; Washington, D.C.	L 0–40	< 4,000	
