= 1947 Colgate Red Raiders football team =

American college football season

1947 Colgate Red Raiders football
- Conference: Independent
- Record: 1–5–2
- Head coach: Paul Bixler (1st season)
- Captain: Glen Treichler
- Home stadium: Colgate Athletic Field

1947 Eastern major college football independents records
	Conf.			Overall
Team	W	L	T	W		L		T
No. 4 Penn State		–		9	–	0	–	1
No. 11 Army		–		5	–	2	–	2
Villanova		–		6	–	3	–	1
Boston University		–		5	–	3	–	0
Boston College		–		5	–	4	–	0
Holy Cross		–		4	–	4	–	2
Syracuse		–		3	–	6	–	0
Temple		–		3	–	6	–	0
NYU		–		2	–	5	–	1
Colgate		–		1	–	5	–	2
Duquesne		–		2	–	8	–	0
Fordham		–		1	–	6	–	1
Merchant Marine		–		2	–	9	–	0
Pittsburgh		–		1	–	8	–	0
Rankings from AP Poll

The 1947 Colgate Red Raiders football team was an American football team represented the Colgate University as an independent during the 1947 college football season. In its first season under head coach Paul Bixler, the team compiled a 1–5–2 record and was outscored by a total of 139 to 87.

Colgate was ranked at No. 113 (out of 500 college football teams) in the final Litkenhous Ratings for 1947.

The team played its home games at Colgate Athletic Field in Hamilton, New York.

== Schedule ==
Date	Opponent	Site	Result	Attendance	Source
October 4	at Merchant Marine	Tomb Memorial Field; Kings Point, NY	W 29–0	8,000	
October 11	Cornell	Colgate Athletic Field; Hamilton, NY (rivalry)	L 18–27	16,000	
October 18	at Princeton	Palmer Stadium; Princeton, NJ	L 7–20	31,000	
October 25	Brown	Colgate Athletic Field; Hamilton, NY	T 13–13	6,000	
November 1	at No. 7 Penn State	New Beaver Field; State College, PA	L 0–46	15,000	
November 8	at Holy Cross	Fitton Field; Worcester, MA	T 6–6	10,000	
November 15	at Syracuse	Archbold Stadium; Syracuse, NY (rivalry)	L 0–7	36,000	
November 29	at Boston University	Fenway Park; Boston, MA	L 14–20	9,877	
Rankings from AP Poll released prior to the game
