= George Munger (American football) =

American football player and coach (1909–1994)

Biographical details
- Born: June 24, 1909; Elkins Park, Pennsylvania, U.S.
- Died: July 21, 1994 (aged 85); Villanova, Pennsylvania, U.S.

Playing career
- 1930–1932: Penn
- Position: Halfback

Coaching career (HC unless noted)
- 1936–1937: Penn (freshmen)
- 1938–1953: Penn

Head coaching record
- Overall: 82–42–10
- College Football Hall of Fame; Inducted in 1976 (profile)

George Almond Munger (June 24, 1909 – July 21, 1994) was an American athlete, coach and athletic director. He played college football and competed in track and field at the University of Pennsylvania from 1930 to 1933. He returned to Penn as head coach of the football team from 1938 to 1953 and as director of physical education from 1954 to 1974. His 1945 and 1947 teams finished ranked among the top ten college football teams in the United States, and he coached five players who were inducted into the College Football Hall of Fame and three who received the Maxwell Award as the best player in college football. Munger was inducted in the College Football Hall of Fame as a coach in 1976. The Maxwell Football Club has present the George Munger Award each year since 1989 to the national college football coach of the year.

== Biography ==
=== Early life ===
Munger was born in Elkins Park, Pennsylvania in 1909. His father, Herbert N. Munger, was the co-owner of the Munger & Long department store in Camden, New Jersey. Munger received his early education at the Friends School in Camden. He received his preparatory education at The Hill School in Pottstown, Pennsylvania and the Episcopal Academy in the Overbrook section of Philadelphia. He was the captain of the football team at Episcopal Academy in 1928 and 1929. He led Episcopal to two undefeated seasons in football and once scored eight touchdowns in a game. He also helped lead Episcopal to two basketball championships and a baseball championship. He also set school records in the pole vault, high jump, discus and javelin.

=== Athlete at Penn ===
He later attended the University of Pennsylvania where he played at the halfback for the Penn Quakers football team from 1930 to 1932. He also competed for Penn in track and field and won the decathlon at the 1932 Penn Relays. With the Penn Relays being comparable to the Olympic Trials, Munger should have been a lock for the 1932 Olympics. But citing a lack of depth in the 1932 Relays field, another Olympics Trials were held in Chicago. Munger failed to clear a starting 12-foot height in the pole vault, finished ninth, and was named an alternate to the squad.

=== Teacher and coach at Episcopal Academy ===
After graduating from Penn in 1933, Munger taught mathematics and religion and coached football at the Episcopal Academy. In September 1935, he married Louise Laycock Smith in the Chapel of the Episcopal Academy.

=== Coach and administrator at Penn ===
Munger was hired by Penn as the freshman football and track coach in 1936 and held that position during the 1936 and 1937 football seasons. In January 1938, the 28-year-old Munger took over as the head coach of the Penn football team. He also became an assistant professor in the Department of Physical Education effective July 1, 1938. He served as the head football coach at Penn for 16 years from 1938 to 1953, compiling a record of 82–42–10 for a .649 winning percentage. His Penn teams finished ranked among the top ten college football teams in the United States on three occasions, including a No. 7 ranking in 1947 and a No. 8 ranking in 1945. Munger's 1947 team finished with an undefeated 7–0–1 record and outscored opponents 219 to 35. The 1947 team shut out both Navy and Cornell by identical scores of 21–0, and its only setback was a 7–7 tie with Army.

Munger coached 16 All-American football players at Penn, and three of his players, Robert H. Odell (1943), Chuck Bednarik (1948) and Reds Bagnell (1950), won the Maxwell Award as the best college football player in the United States. Five of his players have been inducted into the College Football Hall of Fame: Odell, Bednarik, Bagnell, Skip Minisi, and George Savitsky.

During the Munger era, Penn regularly drew crowds of 75,000 to home games at Franklin Field. Munger's teams led the nation in attendance between 1938 and 1942 with 1.78 million fans. The Daily Pennsylvanian later wrote, "The Munger era represented the heyday of Quaker football."

After resigning as the football coach, Munger served as the director of physical education at Penn from 1954 to 1974. He was also a vice-president of the National Football Foundation and the Maxwell Club, president of the American Football Coaches Association, and a member of the U.S. Olympic Equestrian Committee and physical fitness committees under Presidents Franklin Roosevelt, Dwight Eisenhower, and John F. Kennedy. During the summers from 1952 to 1976, he was Director of Camp Tecumseh, a boy's camp in Center Harbor, N.H. founded by three former Olympians in 1903.

=== Honors and awards ===
Munger was inducted into the College Football Hall of Fame in 1976. Munger's biography at the Hall of Fame describes him as "a superb, relaxed athlete, an innovative coach, and a meticulous administrator." The University of Pennsylvania also named its football training complex, the George Munger Training Complex, after him, and the Munger Award is given each year to the most valuable player on the Penn football team.

In 1989, the Maxwell Football Club began awarding the George Munger Award to the college football coach of the year. In its description of the award, the Maxwell Club says of Munger, "His devotion to ethics in athletics, and his commitment to education is the standard for which all college coaches should strive." Recipients of the award include Bo Schembechler, Joe Paterno, Lloyd Carr, Bob Stoops, Pete Carroll, and Urban Meyer. In March 2010, the club announced that the award would be renamed the Joseph V. Paterno Award. After Joe Paterno's involvement in a child sex abuse scandal, the Maxwell Club returned the award to its former name. It continues to be awarded to a promising college football coach every year.

=== Death ===
Munger died from heart failure in July 1994 at age 84. He was survived by his wife Viola, daughter Carol Ober and four grandchildren. At the time of Munger's death, Chuck Bednarik told The Philadelphia Inquirer, "[Munger] taught me a secret – the secret of how to approach life. He was a jovial man who would always laugh and act young. When I saw him a few years ago, it was like he had never changed, like he was in his '40s."

== Head coaching record ==
| Year | Team | Overall | Conference | Standing | Bowl/playoffs | AP^{#} |
|---|---|---|---|---|---|---|
Penn Quakers (Independent) (1938–1953)
| 1938 | Penn | 3–2–3 | | | | |
| 1939 | Penn | 4–4 | | | | |
| 1940 | Penn | 6–1–1 | | | | 14 |
| 1941 | Penn | 7–1 | | | | 15 |
| 1942 | Penn | 5–3–1 | | | | |
| 1943 | Penn | 6–2–1 | | | | 20 |
| 1944 | Penn | 5–3 | | | | |
| 1945 | Penn | 6–2 | | | | 8 |
| 1946 | Penn | 6–2 | | | | 13 |
| 1947 | Penn | 7–0–1 | | | | 7 |
| 1948 | Penn | 5–3 | | | | |
| 1949 | Penn | 4–4 | | | | |
| 1950 | Penn | 6–3 | | | | |
| 1951 | Penn | 5–4 | | | | |
| 1952 | Penn | 4–3–2 | | | | |
| 1953 | Penn | 3–5–1 | | | | |
| Penn: | | 82–42–10 | | | | |
| Total: | | 82–42–10 | | | | |
