= 1947 Duquesne Dukes football team =

American college football season

1947 Duquesne Dukes football
- Conference: Independent
- Record: 2–8
- Head coach: Kass Kovalcheck (1st season)
- Home stadium: Forbes Field

1947 Eastern major college football independents records
	Conf.			Overall
Team	W	L	T	W		L		T
No. 4 Penn State		–		9	–	0	–	1
No. 11 Army		–		5	–	2	–	2
Villanova		–		6	–	3	–	1
Boston University		–		5	–	3	–	0
Boston College		–		5	–	4	–	0
Holy Cross		–		4	–	4	–	2
Syracuse		–		3	–	6	–	0
Temple		–		3	–	6	–	0
NYU		–		2	–	5	–	1
Colgate		–		1	–	5	–	2
Duquesne		–		2	–	8	–	0
Fordham		–		1	–	6	–	1
Merchant Marine		–		2	–	9	–	0
Pittsburgh		–		1	–	8	–	0
Rankings from AP Poll

The 1947 Duquesne Dukes football team was an American football team that represented Duquesne University in the 1947 college football season. In its first season under head coach Kass Kovalcheck, the team compiled a 2–8 record and was outscored by a total of 262 to 45.

In the final Litkenhous Ratings released in mid-December, Duquesne was ranked at No. 153 out of 500 college football teams.

The team played its home games at Forbes Field in Pittsburgh.

== Schedule ==
Date	Opponent	Site	Result	Attendance	Source
September 20	Geneva	Forbes Field; Pittsburgh, PA	W 7–0	12,000	
September 27	Western Reserve	Forbes Field; Pittsburgh, PA	W 6–0	7,608	
October 5	at San Francisco	Kezar Stadium; San Francisco, CA	L 0–51	12,000	
October 11	at Alabama	Denny Stadium; Tuscaloosa, AL	L 0–26	25,000	
October 18	at Mississippi State	Scott Field; Starkville, MS	L 0–34	10,000	
October 24	at Detroit	University of Detroit Stadium; Detroit, MI	L 6–38	17,547	
November 8	Maryland	Forbes Field; Pittsburgh, PA	L 0–32		
November 15	Clemson	Forbes Field; Pittsburgh, PA	L 13–34	6,000	
November 21	at Wake Forest	Bowman Gray Stadium; Winston-Salem, NC	L 0–33	10,000	
November 27	at Saint Louis	Walsh Stadium; St. Louis, MO	L 13–14	9,272	
