= 1947 Fordham Rams football team =

American college football season

1947 Fordham Rams football
- Conference: Independent
- Record: 1–6–1
- Head coach: Ed Danowski (2nd season)
- Offensive scheme: T formation
- Home stadium: Polo Grounds

1947 Eastern major college football independents records
	Conf.			Overall
Team	W	L	T	W		L		T
No. 4 Penn State		–		9	–	0	–	1
No. 11 Army		–		5	–	2	–	2
Villanova		–		6	–	3	–	1
Boston University		–		5	–	3	–	0
Boston College		–		5	–	4	–	0
Holy Cross		–		4	–	4	–	2
Syracuse		–		3	–	6	–	0
Temple		–		3	–	6	–	0
NYU		–		2	–	5	–	1
Colgate		–		1	–	5	–	2
Duquesne		–		2	–	8	–	0
Fordham		–		1	–	6	–	1
Merchant Marine		–		2	–	9	–	0
Pittsburgh		–		1	–	8	–	0
Rankings from AP Poll

The 1947 Fordham Rams football team was an American football team that represented Fordham University as an independent during the 1947 college football season. In its second season under head coach Ed Danowski, the team compiled a 1–6–1 record and was outscored opponents by a total of 245 to Rams offense scored 44.

After a winless 1946 season, Fordham boosters raised money for 30 new scholarships. In addition, the school made several additions to its coaching staff, including the hiring of Vince Lombardi. Lombardi was responsible for coaching the freshman team. In addition, he helped the varsity team implement the T-Formation on offense. Lombardi did this for a salary of $3,500 a year. Athletic director Jack Coffey stated that he thought Lombardi would one day become head coach of the varsity team.

In the final Litkenhous Ratings released in mid-December, Fordham was ranked at No. 318 out of 500 college football teams.

== Schedule ==
Date	Opponent	Site	Result	Attendance	Source
October 3	at Georgetown	Griffith Stadium; Washington, DC	L 7–40	12,500	
October 11	No. 12 Penn State	Polo Grounds; New York, NY	L 0–75	12,000	
October 18	at Rutgers	Rutgers Stadium; Piscataway, NJ	L 6-36	10,000	
October 25	at Merchant Marine	Tomb Memorial Field; Kings Point, NY	W 12–0	9,000	
November 1	at Boston University	Fenway Park; Boston, MA	L 6–26	2,703	
November 15	at Lafayette	Polo Grounds; New York, NY	L 0–7	5,900	
November 22	at Holy Cross	Fitton Field; Worcester, MA	L 0–48	7,000	
November 29	vs. NYU	Polo Grounds; New York, NY	T 13–13	27,000	
Rankings from AP Poll released prior to the game

== Freshman team ==
The freshman team was Vince Lombardi's first experience as a head coach above the high school level. Many of the freshmen on the team were in their twenties. Three of the freshmen were players that Lombardi had coached in high school: Dick Doheny, Billy White and Larry Higgins. Twenty-three-year-old freshman Herb Seidell was elected as captain of the freshman team. He had served in the Navy with Leo Paquin, who was one of Lombardi's teammates on Fordham's Seven Blocks of Granite. Dick Doheny was the starting quarterback. One of the highlights for the team was defeating Rutgers freshman team by a score of 12–0. The Rams held the Scarlet Knights to negative yards, while the Rams gained 400 yards on the ground. After a 33–0 defeat of New York University's freshman team, the New York Herald Tribune stated that Lombardi should feel proud for a job well done. Other members in the media were very optimistic about Lombardi because the varsity team finished the season with a record of 1–6–1.
