= Bill Reinhart =

American college sports coach (1896–1971)

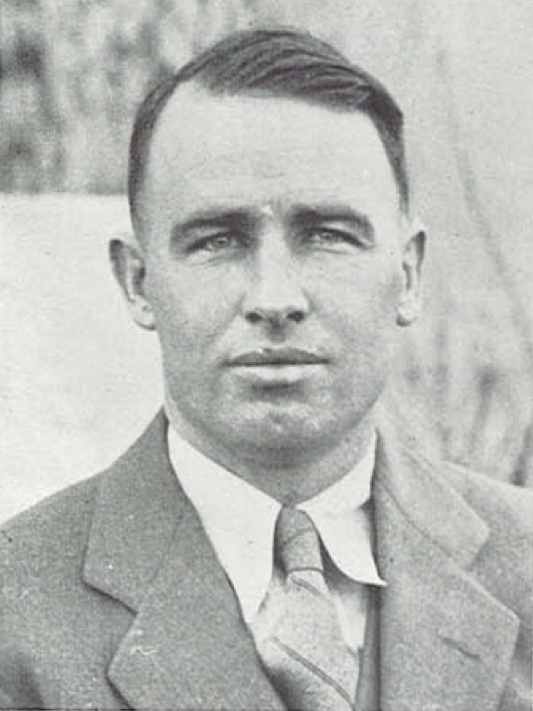
- Reinhart from the 1934 Oregana

Biographical details
- Born: August 2, 1896
- Died: February 14, 1971 (aged 74); Washington, D.C., U.S.

Playing career

Football
- 1919–1921: Oregon
- Position: Quarterback

Coaching career (HC unless noted)

Football
- ?: Oregon (assistant)
- 1938–1941: George Washington
- 1945: Fleet City
- 1946–1949: Merchant Marine

Basketball
- 1923–1935: Oregon
- 1935–1942: George Washington
- 1949–1966: George Washington

Baseball
- 1924–1935: Oregon
- 1950–1966: George Washington

Administrative career (AD unless noted)
- 1946–1949: Merchant Marine

Head coaching record
- Overall: 28–42–3 (football); 499–338 (basketball); 295–225–5 (baseball)

Accomplishments and honors

Championships
- Basketball; 2 SoCon regular season (1954, 1956); 2 SoCon tournament (1954, 1961) Baseball; 4 SoCon

Awards
- Southern Conference Basketball Coach of the Year (1954); Helms Basketball Hall of Fame (1956); George Washington University Athletics Hall of Fame (1993); University of Oregon Athletics Hall of Fame (1994)

William J. Reinhart (August 2, 1896 – February 14, 1971) was an American college basketball, football, and baseball coach at George Washington University, the University of Oregon, and the United States Merchant Marine Academy. From 1923 to 1935, he served as the head basketball coach at Oregon. He is the school's second-winningest coach with 180 victories. His record through 13 seasons at Oregon was 180–101. He suffered only one losing season. Largely due to his success, Oregon was forced to build McArthur Court to accommodate the large crowds that became fixtures for Ducks games on his watch.

At George Washington, he compiled a 319–237 record in basketball, or .574 winning percentage, including a 23–3 season in 1953–54. His teams twice made the NCAA tournament, in 1954 and 1961, George Washington's only trips to the NCAA Tournament until Mike Jarvis's team in 1993. Players he coached at George Washington included future Basketball Hall of Famer Red Auerbach and future National Basketball Association (NBA) players Joe Holup, Corky Devlin and Gene Guarilia and at Oregon he coached Howard Hobson. Auerbach said Reinhart's coaching and fast break offenses were "15 years ahead of their time."

Reinhart also was head football coach at George Washington and the United States Merchant Marine Academy, assistant football coach at Oregon, and head baseball coach at Oregon and George Washington.

Reinhart died of cancer on February 14, 1971, at Georgetown University Hospital in Washington, D.C. He was inducted into George Washington's athletic hall of fame in 1993.

A collection of papers and memorabilia related to Reinhart is housed in the Special Collections Research Center of The George Washington University. The collection includes correspondence, photographs, certificates, and news clippings. The material ranges in date from 1920 to 1993.

== Head coaching record ==
=== Football ===
Year	Team	Overall	Conference	Standing	Bowl/playoffs
George Washington Colonials (Independent) (1938–1940)
1938	George Washington	5–4			
1939	George Washington	5–3			
1940	George Washington	5–3–1			
George Washington Colonials (Southern Conference) (1941)
1941	George Washington	1–7–1	0–4–1	15th	
George Washington:		16–17–2	0–4–1		
Fleet City Bluejackets (Independent) (1945)
1945	Fleet City	11–0–1			
Fleet City:		11–0–1			
Merchant Marine Mariners (Independent) (1946–1949)
1946	Merchant Marine	4–7			
1947	Merchant Marine	2–9			
1948	Merchant Marine	3–4–1			
1949	Merchant Marine	3–5			
Merchant Marine:		12–25–1			
Total:		39–42–4			

=== Basketball ===
Record table
Season	Team	Overall	Conference	Standing	Postseason
Oregon Webfoots (Pacific Coast Conference) (1923–1935)
1923–24	Oregon	15–5	4–4	3rd	
1924–25	Oregon	15–5	7–2	T–1st	
1925–26	Oregon	18–4	10–0	1st	
1926–27	Oregon	24–4	8–2	1st	
1927–28	Oregon	18–3	8–2	2nd	
1928–29	Oregon	10–8	3–7	5th	
1929–30	Oregon	14–12	8–8	3rd	
1930–31	Oregon	12–10	6–10	4th	
1931–32	Oregon	13–11	7–9	4th	
1932–33	Oregon	8–19	2–14	5th	
1933–34	Oregon	17–8	9–7	2nd	
1934–35	Oregon	16–12	7–9	3rd	
Oregon:		180–101 (.641)	79–74 (.516)		
George Washington Colonials (Independent) (1935–1941)
1935–36	George Washington	16–3			
1936–37	George Washington	16–4			
1937–38	George Washington	13–4			
1938–39	George Washington	13–8			
1939–40	George Washington	13–6			
1940–41	George Washington	18–4			
George Washington Colonials (Southern Conference) (1941–1942)
1941–42	George Washington	11–9	8–3	2nd	
George Washington Colonials (Southern Conference) (1949–1966)
1949–50	George Washington	17–8	12–4	T–2nd	
1950–51	George Washington	12–12	8–9	10th	
1951–52	George Washington	15–9	12–6	5th	
1952–53	George Washington	15–7	12–6	9th	
1953–54	George Washington	23–3	10–0	1st	NCAA first round
1954–55	George Washington	24–6	8–2	2nd	
1955–56	George Washington	19–7	10–2	T–1st	
1956–57	George Washington	3–21	3–9	9th	
1957–58	George Washington	12–11	8–4	3rd	
1958–59	George Washington	14–11	4–7	7th	
1959–60	George Washington	15–11	7–5	5th	
1960–61	George Washington	9–17	3–9	7th	NCAA University Division first round
1961–62	George Washington	9–15	6–7	4th	
1962–63	George Washington	8–15	6–6	T–5th	
1963–64	George Washington	11–15	5–7	6th	
1964–65	George Washington	10–13	6–7	5th	
1965–66	George Washington	3–18	3–9	9th	
George Washington:		319–237 (.574)	131–102 (.562)		
Total:		499–338 (.596)			
National champion Postseason invitational champion Conference regular season champion Conference regular season and conference tournament champion Division regular season champion Division regular season and conference tournament champion Conference tournament champion
