= 1947 Princeton Tigers football team =

American college football season

1947 Princeton Tigers football
- Conference: Independent
- Record: 5–3
- Head coach: Charlie Caldwell (3rd season)
- Home stadium: Palmer Stadium

1947 Ivy Group football standings
	Conf.					Overall
Team	W		L		T	W		L		T
No. 7 Penn	4	–	0	–	0	7	–	0	–	1
Princeton	4	–	2	–	0	5	–	3	–	0
Yale	3	–	2	–	0	6	–	3	–	0
No. 20 Columbia	2	–	2	–	0	7	–	2	–	0
Harvard	1	–	3	–	0	4	–	5	–	0
Brown	1	–	3	–	0	4	–	4	–	1
Dartmouth	3	–	4	–	0	4	–	4	–	1
Cornell	1	–	4	–	0	4	–	5	–	0
Rankings from AP Poll

The 1947 Princeton Tigers football team was an American football team that represented Princeton University during the 1947 college football season. In its third season under head coach Charlie Caldwell, the team compiled a 5–4 record and outscored opponents by a total of 140 to 100.

Key players on the team included fullback George Franke and halfback George Sella.

Princeton was ranked at No. 49 (out of 500 college football teams) in the final Litkenhous Ratings for 1947.

The team played its home games at Palmer Stadium in Princeton, New Jersey.

== Schedule ==
Date	Opponent	Site	Result	Attendance	Source
October 4	Brown	Palmer Stadium; Princeton, NJ	W 21–7	25,000	
October 11	at Rutgers	Rutgers Stadium; Piscataway, NJ (rivalry)	L 7–13	30,426	
October 18	Colgate	Palmer Stadium; Princeton, NJ	W 20–7	31,000	
October 25	Cornell	Palmer Stadium; Princeton, NJ	L 21–28	34,000	
November 1	No. 4 Penn	Palmer Stadium; Princeton, NJ	L 7–26	49,000	
November 8	at Harvard	Harvard Stadium; Boston, MA (rivalry)	W 33–7	25,000	
November 15	Yale	Palmer Stadium; Princeton, NJ (rivalry)	W 17–0	50,000	
November 22	Dartmouth	Palmer Stadium; Princeton, NJ	W 14–12	26,000	
Rankings from AP Poll released prior to the game
