= 1947 Pittsburgh Panthers football team =

American college football season

1947 Pittsburgh Panthers football
- Conference: Independent
- Record: 1–8
- Head coach: Mike Milligan (1st season)
- Home stadium: Pitt Stadium

1947 Eastern major college football independents records
	Conf.			Overall
Team	W	L	T	W		L		T
No. 4 Penn State		–		9	–	0	–	1
No. 11 Army		–		5	–	2	–	2
Villanova		–		6	–	3	–	1
Boston University		–		5	–	3	–	0
Boston College		–		5	–	4	–	0
Holy Cross		–		4	–	4	–	2
Syracuse		–		3	–	6	–	0
Temple		–		3	–	6	–	0
NYU		–		2	–	5	–	1
Colgate		–		1	–	5	–	2
Duquesne		–		2	–	8	–	0
Fordham		–		1	–	6	–	1
Merchant Marine		–		2	–	9	–	0
Pittsburgh		–		1	–	8	–	0
Rankings from AP Poll

The 1947 Pittsburgh Panthers football team was an American football team that represented the University of Pittsburgh as an independent during the 1947 college football season. In its first season under head coach Mike Milligan, the team compiled a 1–8 record and was outscored by a total of 267 to 26.

Pitt was ranked at No. 81 (out of 500 college football teams) in the final Litkenhous Ratings for 1947.

== Schedule ==
Date	Opponent	Site	Result	Attendance	Source
September 27	at Illinois	Memorial Stadium; Champaign, IL	L 0–14	22,079	
October 4	Notre Dame	Pitt Stadium; Pittsburgh, PA (rivalry)	L 6–40	64,333	
October 11	at No. 2 Michigan	Michigan Stadium; Ann Arbor, MI	L 0–69	59,964	
October 18	at Indiana	Memorial Stadium; Bloomington, IN	L 6–41	25,000	
October 25	Ohio State	Pitt Stadium; Pittsburgh, PA	W 12–0	55,217	
November 1	at Minnesota	Memorial Stadium; Minneapolis, MN	L 0–29	56,334	
November 15	at Purdue	Ross–Ade Stadium; West Lafayette, IN	L 0–28	19,000	
November 22	No. 5 Penn State	Pitt Stadium; Pittsburgh, PA (rivalry)	L 0–29	53,000	
November 29	West Virginia	Pitt Stadium; Pittsburgh, PA (rivalry)	L 2–17	15,000	
Rankings from AP Poll released prior to the game

== Preseason ==
On February 14, after compiling a 3–5–1 record in his first year as Pitt head coach, Wesley Fesler accepted the head coaching position at his alma mater Ohio State. On February 17, assistant head coach Mike Milligan, a former Pitt Panther guard (1929–1931), was appointed head coach unanimously by the Athletic Director James Hagan, the Board of Trustees and Chancellor Rufus Fitzgerald. "I am pleased that we have a man on our coaching staff who has won the united support of the university and community for the position of head football coach," Chancellor Fitzgerald said. "Walter S. Milligan is a top-flight coach with a fine influence on young men."

On March 17, 115 freshmen and returning military football aspirants reported for Coach Milligan's two-week spring practice introductory session. The holdovers from the 1946 roster reported on March 31. On May 10, Milligan's first spring session ended after 7 weeks with a final squad game, in which the first string defeated the second 28–6.

Fall practice began on September 3, rather than mid-August, due to a new Western Conference ruling. Pitt still felt if they followed the Conference's policies they would ultimately be asked to join the Conference. Fifty-six Panthers, including 27 lettermen, reported for 2 weeks of training at the Arandale Hotel and Country Club in Bedford, PA. The squad returned to Pittsburgh on the seventeenth with just another week to prepare for their opening game at Illinois.

== Coaching staff ==
1947 Pittsburgh Panthers football staff
Coaching staff: Walter "Mike" Milligan – head coach; Charles Hartwig – assistant coach; Dick Cassiano – assistant backfield coach; Ralph Mitterling – assistant line coach; Harold Williams – assistant coach; Robert Timmons – assistant defensive coach	Support staff: James Hagan - director of athletics; Frank Carver – publicity director; Dr. Ralph Shanor – team physician; Howard Waite – trainer; Bill Haines – equipment manager; Velton Castrodale – student manager

== Roster ==
1947 Pittsburgh Panthers football roster
Player	Position	Games	Weight	Height	Class	Prep School	Hometown
William Abraham (USN)	halfback	0	190	5 ft 7 in	junior	Jeannette H. S.	Jeanette, PA
Bernard Barkouskie*	guard	9	190	5 ft 8 in	sophomore	Wilkes-Barre H. S.	Wilkes-Barre, PA
Robert Becker	fullback	3	190	6 ft	sophomore	Westinghouse H. S.	Pittsburgh, PA
Michael Boldin (Army)*	tackle	9	210	6 ft	freshman	Johnstown H. S.	Johnstown, PA
Fred Botti (USN)	halfback	1	190	6 ft	sophomore	Connellsville H. S.	Connellsville, PA
William Bruno (USMC)*	fullback	5	185	6 ft	sophomore	Penn H. S.	Verona, PA
Frank Capello (Army)*	end	6	180	5 ft 11 in	sophomore	Elwood City H. S.	Elwood City, PA
Louis Cecconi*	quarterback	9	160	5 ft 6 in	sophomore	Donora H. S.	Donora, PA
Joe Cherol (USN)	halfback	1	175	5 ft 6 in	sophomore	Youngstown H. S.	Youngstown, OH
Fred Cimino (Army)	guard	0	190	5 ft 10 in	freshman	Weirton H. S.	Weirton, WV
Ralph Coleman (USN)*	guard	7	215	6 ft 1 in	junior	Ambridge H. S.	Ambridge, PA
William Coury (AC)*	guard	5	185	5 ft 9 in	sophomore	Arnold H.S.	Arnold, PA
Walter Cummins (Army)*	end	8	205	6 ft 2 in	junior	Greensburg H. S.	Greensburg, PA
Sam DeFede	tackle	1	195	5 ft 11 in	freshman	Martins Ferry H. S.	Martins Ferry, OH
James DeLong (USN)*	tackle	5	210	6 ft 2 in	sophomore	Reading H. S.	Reading, PA
Carl DePasqua*	quarterback	9	170	5 ft 9 in	sophomore	Williamsport. H.S.	Williamsport, PA
Anthony DiMatteo (AC)*	halfback	8	185	5 ft 11in	junior	Perry H. S.	Pittsburgh, PA
Frank Farrell (AC)	guard	3	190	5 ft 10 in	freshman	Mt. Pleasant H. S.	Mt. Pleasant, PA
Donald Fisher (USMC)	center	3	180	5 ft 11 in	junior	Williamsport H. S.	Williamsport, PA
Wilbur Forsythe (AC)*	tackle	9	210	6 ft 3 in	junior	East Huntingdon H. S.	East Huntingdon, PA
Peter Fuderich (USN)*	quarterback	8	175	5 ft 7 in	junior	Aliquippa H. S.	Aliquippa, PA
Ted Geremski (USN)	end	5	205	6 ft 4 in	freshman	Braddock H. S.	Braddock, PA
William Goelz (USN)	end	4	180	6 ft	senior	Crafton H. S.	Crafton, PA
Sam Haddad (USMC)*	center	2	210	6 ft 3 in	sophomore	New Castle H. S.	New Castle, PA
William Hardisty (USN)*	fullback	9	215	6 ft 2 in	sophomore	Langley H. S.	Pittsburgh, PA
Morris Harris (Army)	tackle	4	240	6 ft	sophomore	Glassport H. S.	Glassport, PA
Robert Hawkins	end	0	210	6 ft 3 in	sophomore	Covington H. S.	Covington, VA
Nick Ianni	tackle	0	195	5 ft 10 in	freshman	East Deer H. S.	East Deer, PA
George Johnson (Army)	guard	2	205	6 ft 3 in	senior	German Twp. H. S.	Edenborn, PA
Ray Johnson (Army)	tackle	0	210	6 ft 3 in	freshman	Oliver H. S.	Pittsburgh, PA
Donald Karanovich*	tackle	8	185	6 ft 2 in	freshman	Irwin H. S.	Irwin, PA
Andrew Kisiday (USN)	center	4	185	5 ft 11 in	sophomore	Ambridge H. S.	Ambridge, PA
John Kosh (Army)*	center	1	195	6 ft	senior	Donora H. S.	Donora, PA
Elmer Kozzora (Army)	halfback	3	170	5 ft 9 in	sophomore	Dormont H. S.	Dormont, PA
John LaFrankie (USMC)*	quarterback	0	195	6 ft	sophomore	Elizabeth H. S.	Elizabeth, PA
Lindaro Lauro (AC)*	quarterback	7	200	5 ft 10 in	sophomore	New Castle H. S.	New Castle, PA
Robert Lee (USMC)*	halfback	5	175	5 ft 10 in	sophomore	New Castle H. S.	New Castle, PA
William McPeak (USN)*	end	9	195	6 ft	junior	New Castle H. S.	New Castle, PA
Lester Malizia (Army)	tackle	0	175	5 ft 11 in	sophomore	New Castle H. S.	New Castle, PA
George Matich (S)	quarterback	4	180	5 ft 10 in	sophomore	Clairton H. S.	Clairton, PA
Mark Maystrovich (Army)	quarterback	3	190	6 ft	freshman	Irwin H. S.	Irwin, PA
William Mihm*	end	8	185	6 ft	junior	Westinghouse H. S.	Pittsburgh, PA
Robert Plotz*	tackle	6	195	6 ft	sophomore	Martins Ferry H. S.	Martins Ferry, OH
Emil Rader (Army)	fullback	4	195	6 ft	freshman	Wheeling H. S.	MWheeling, WVA
Leonard Radnor*	center	7	185	5 ft 10 in	sophomore	Plymouth H. S.	Plymouth, PA
Anthony Razzano (Army)	guard	4	180	5 ft 8 in	sophomore	New Castle H. S.	New Castle, PA
Paul Rickards (AC)*	halfback	6	185	6 ft	sophomore	Wheeling H. S.	Wheeling, WV
James Robinson (Army)*	halfback	9	180	5 ft 10 in	sophomore	Connellsville H. S.	Connellsville, PA
William Samer	end	4	190	6 ft 2 in	sophomore	Donora H. S.	Donora, PA
Robert Schneider (AC)	end	0	190	6 ft 2 in	junior	Central Catholic H. S.	Pittsburgh, PA
Robert Shanta	end	5	170	6 ft	sophomore	McKees Rocks H. S.	McKees Rocks, PA
Fred Sherman	halfback	0	170	5 ft 9 in	freshman	Hanover Twp. H. S.	Hanover Township, PA
Boleshaw Shiner (USN)	tackle	0	200	6 ft 1 in	freshman	McKees Rocks H. S.	McKees Rocks, PA
Ralph Short	center	0	195	6 ft 1 in	sophomore	Martins Ferry H. S.	Martins Ferry, OH
Leo Skladany*	end	8	200	6 ft 1 in	junior	Plymouth H. S.	Plymouth, PA
Edwin Smith (AC)	center	0	215	6 ft 2 in	sophomore	McKeesport H. S.	McKeesport, PA
Jack Smodic*	halfback	9	165	5 ft 10 in	junior	German Twp. H. S.	Gates, PA
Earl Sumpter*	cguard	9	175	5 ft 10 in	sophomore	Clairton H. S.	Clairton, PA
Robert Teitt	fullback	0	185	5 ft 8 in	sophomore	Trafford H. S.	Trafforda, PA
Charles Thomas	guard	3	185	6 ft 2 in	sophomore	Dormont H. S.	Dormont, PA
Jack Ulam (AC)	halfback	5	170	5 ft 9 in	junior	Mt. Lebanon H. S.	Mt. Lebanon, PA
Gildo Vieceli	tackle	0	205	6 ft 2 in	freshman	Irwin H. S.	Irwin, PA
Lee Ward (Army)*	center	8	175	5 ft 11 in	sophomore	Mt. Lebanon H. S.	Mt. Lebanon, PA
Harold Wertman	fullback	0	200	6 ft 1 in	sophomore	Shamokin H. S.	Shamokin, PA
* Letterman

== Game summaries ==
=== at Illinois ===
Week 1: Pitt at Illinois

Team	1	2	3	4	Total
Pitt	0	0	0	0	0
• Illinois	0	0	0	14	14

- Date: September 27, 1947
- Location: Memorial Stadium
  Champaign, IL
- Game start: 2:00 p.m.
- Game attendance: 22,079
- Game weather: fair and cool
- Referee: Russell Rupp (Lebanon Valley)

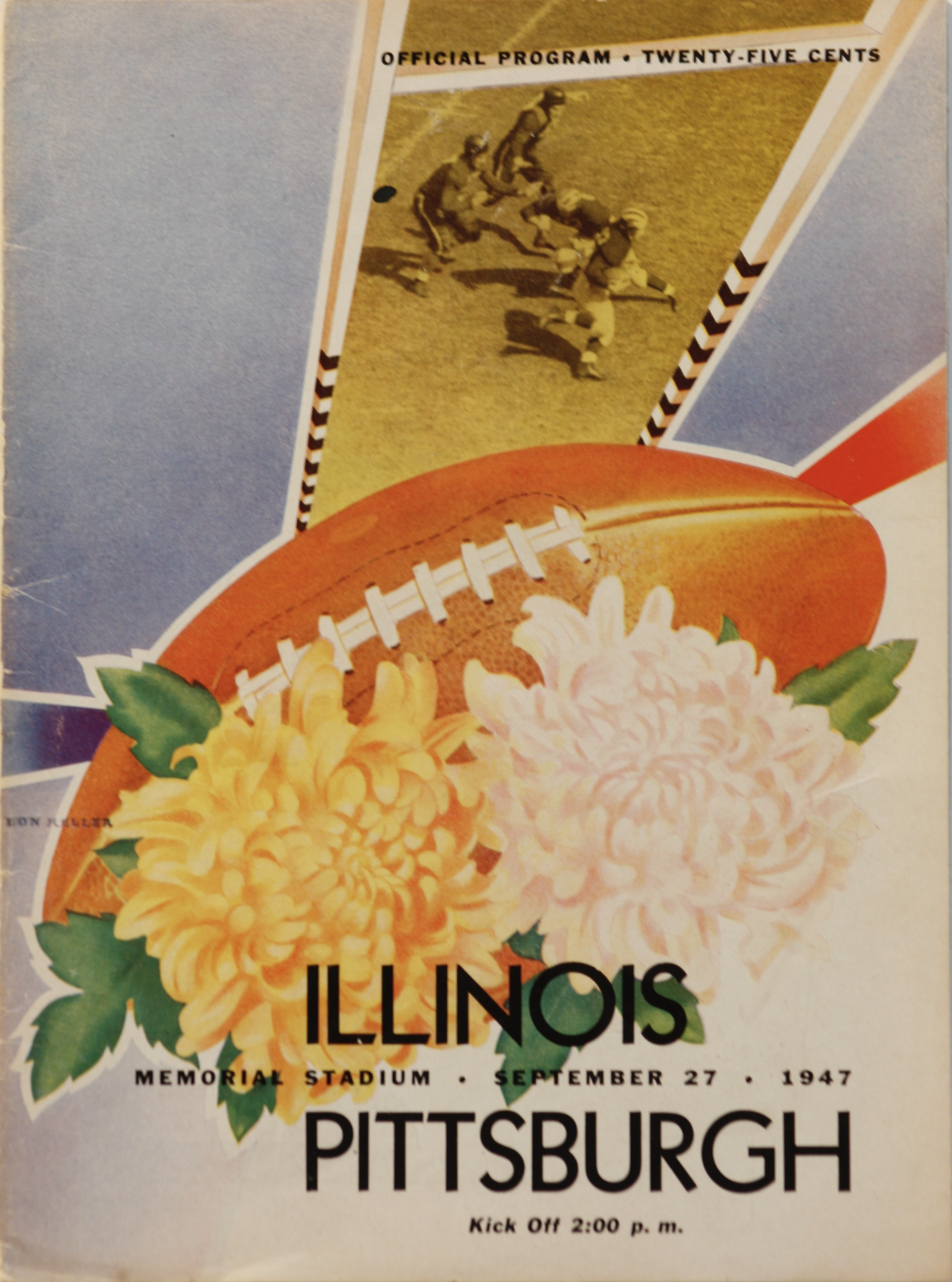
Program for September 27 game vs. Illinois

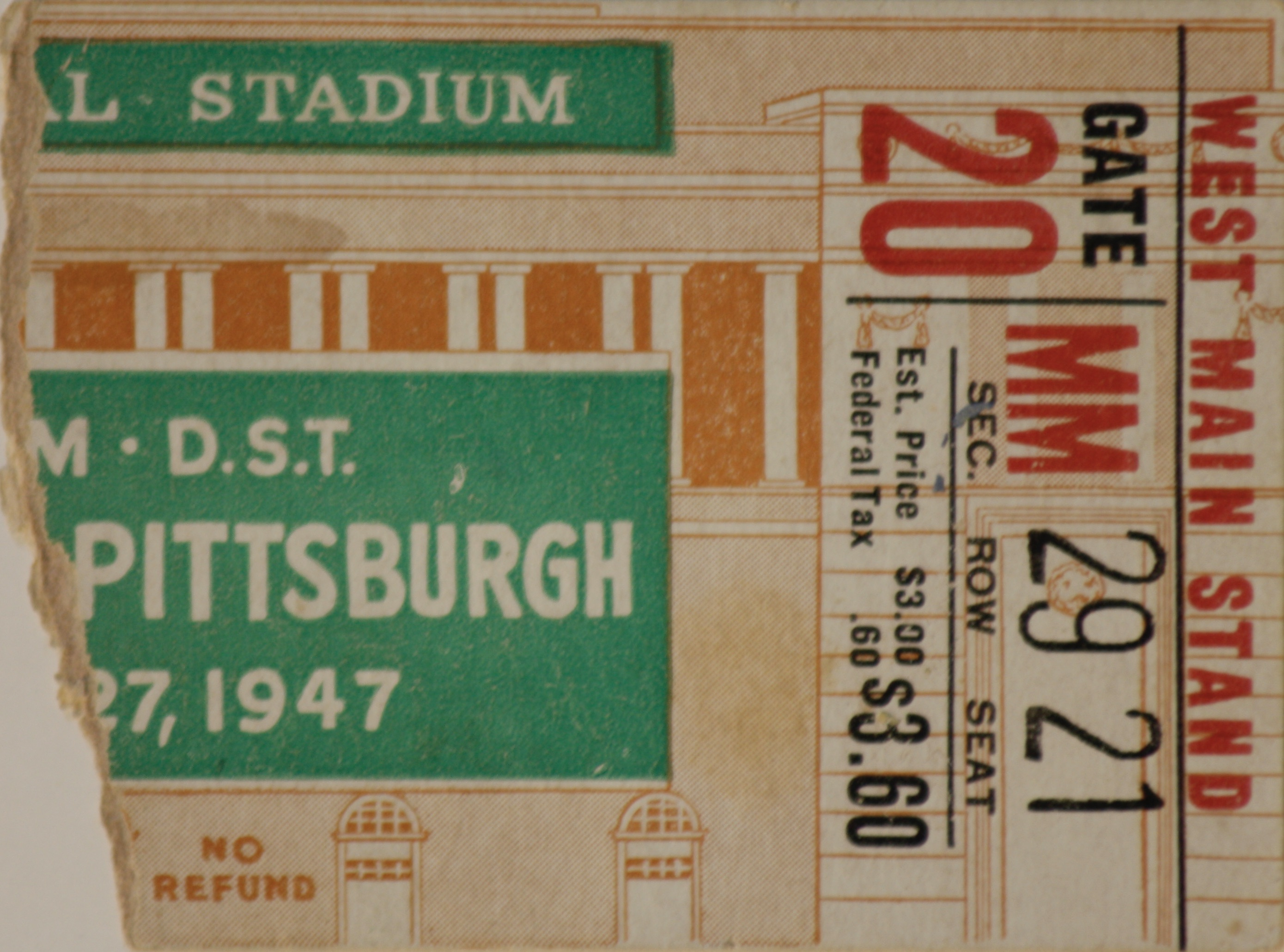
Stub for September 27 game vs. Illinois

On September 27, Pitt opened their season at Champaign, IL against the Fighting Illini. Illinois led the series 4–0 and had outscored the Panthers 128–43. Coach Ray Eliot had 29 returning veterans from his 1946 Western Conference and 1947 Rose Bowl Championship team.

On Friday morning, the Panthers 35-man traveling squad arrived in Chicago by train, and then boarded the Orange Blossom Special to Champaign. They were housed at the Inman Hotel. The squad practiced at Memorial Stadium on Friday afternoon. Coach Milligan's Panthers were the decided underdogs. "We've got a small squad both physically and numerically," he explained. "Our boys will give all they've got but in too many cases it may not be enough."

While the Panthers defense held the Illini scoreless for 47 minutes, the Panther offense was unable to move the ball. Three minutes into the final period, Perry Moss connected with Dwight Eddleman on a 20-yard touchdown pass. Don Maechtle added the point after and Illinois led 7–0.The Illini added another late touchdown on a 40-yard punt return by Eddleman. Maechtle converted the placement and Pitt lost 14–0. Illinois had 18 first downs and gained 316 yards. Their defense held the Panthers to 4 first downs and a total of 75 yards gained. Conversely, the Panthers defense forced 7 fumbles and recovered 6 to keep the game closer than expected.

The Pitt starting lineup for the game against Illinois was Leo Skladaney (left end), Morris Harris (left tackle), Bernie Barkouskie (left guard), Leonard Radnor (center), George Johnson (right guard), Robert Plotz (right tackle), William McPeak (right end), William Bruno (quarterback), James Robinson (left halfback), Carl DePasqua (right halfback) and Tony DiMatteo (fullback). Substitutes appearing in the game for Pitt were William Mihm, Robert Shanta, Michael Boldin, Wilbur Forsythe, Don Karanovich, Anthony Razzano, John Kosh, Earl Sumpter, Ralph Coleman, Lee Ward, Andrew Kisiday, William Hardisty, George Matich, Walter Cummins, Jack Smodic, Louis Cecconi, Elmer Kozzora, Peter Fuderich and Emil Rader.

Scoring summary

Quarter	Time	Drive			Team	Scoring information	Score	
Quarter	Time	Plays	Yards	TOP	Team	Scoring information	Pittsburgh	Illinois
4		5	47		Illinois	Dwight Eddleman 25-yard touchdown reception from Perry Moss, Don Maechtle kick good	0	7
4		1	40		Illinois	Punt returned 40 yards for touchdown by Dwight Eddleman, Don Maechtle kick good	0	14
"TOP" = time of possession. For other American football terms, see Glossary of American football.							0	14

=== Notre Dame ===
Week 2: Notre Dame at Pitt

Team	1	2	3	4	Total
• Notre Dame	7	6	7	20	40
Pitt	0	6	0	0	6

- Date: October 4, 1947
- Location: Pitt Stadium
  Pittsburgh, PA
- Game start: 2:00 p.m.
- Game attendance: 64,333
- Game weather: sunny and hot
- Referee: Lloyd Larson (Wisconsin)

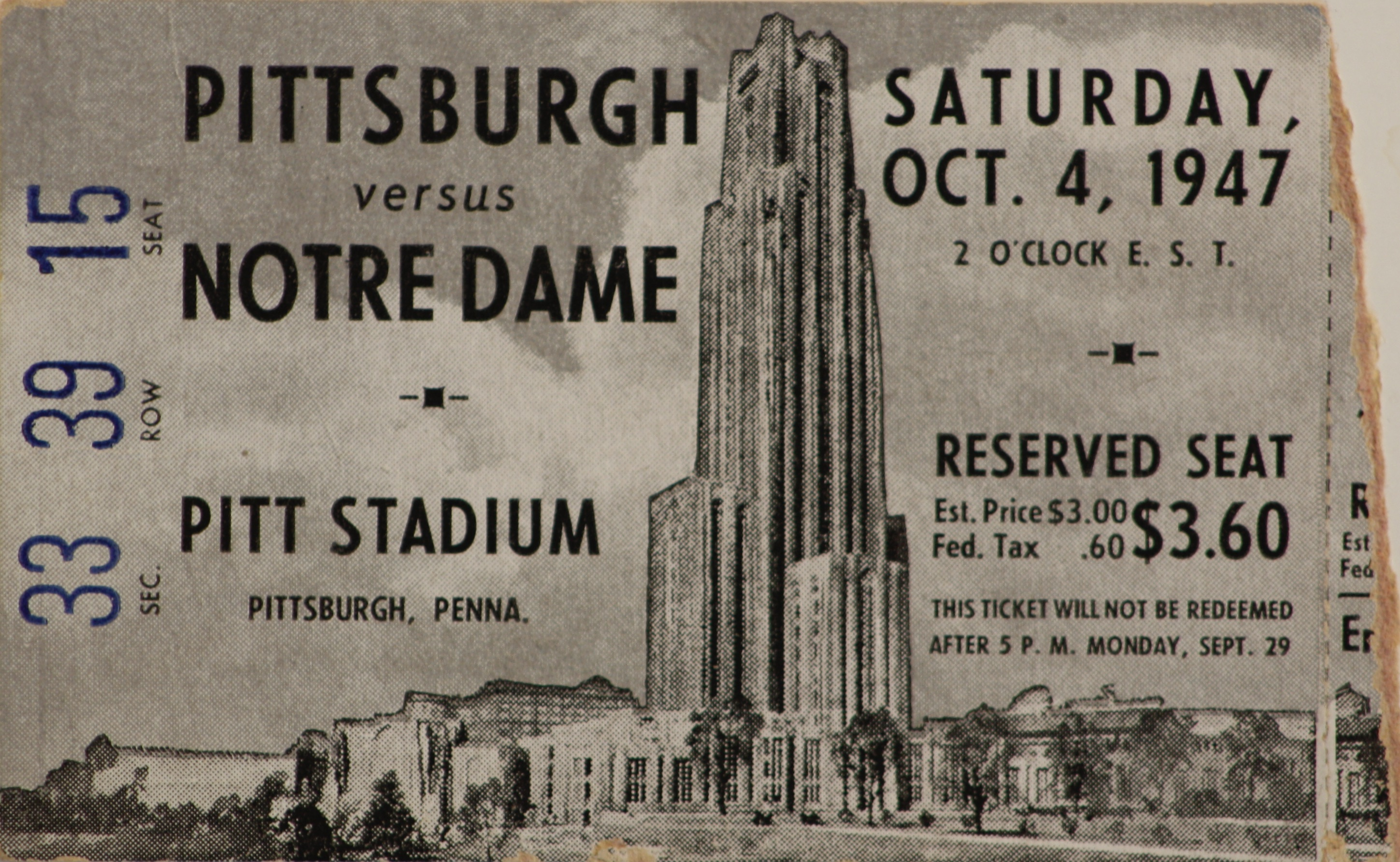
Stub for October 4 game vs. Notre Dame

On October 5, Notre Dame, the defending National Champions, opened their season against the Pitt Panthers. Notre Dame led the all-time series 9–5–1 and had outscored the Panthers 171–9 in the previous 4 games. Coach Frank Leahy's squad boasted 7 All-Americans – quarterback Johnny Lujack, halfback Terry Brennan, tackles George Connor and Zygmont Czarobski, guard Bill Fischer, center George Strohmeyer, and end Leon Hart.

Coach Milligan made a few changes to the lineup. Quarterback Bill Bruno hurt himself playing soccer in Phys. ed. Class, and was replaced by George Matich. Wilbur Forsythe started at left tackle and Ted Geremski started at left guard. Louis Cecconi replaced Carl DePasqua at left halfback.

Notre Dame pummeled the Panthers 40–6. The Panthers made a game of it for the first half, and only trailed 13–6 at the break. The Irish scored 4 unanswered touchdowns in the second half to seal the victory. Terry Brennan, Doug Waybright, James Martin, Leon Hart, Coy McGee and Lancaster Smith each scored a touchdown, and Fred Earley converted 4 extra points. The lone Panther score came in the second period on a 7-yard run by Carl DePasqua. Louis Cecconi's placement was blocked by Bill Wightkin.

The Pitt starting lineup for the game against Notre Dame was Leo Skladaney (left end), Wilbur Forsythe (left tackle), Bernie Barkouskie (left guard), Ted Geremski (center), George Johnson (right guard), Robert Plotz (right tackle), William McPeak (right end), George Matich (quarterback), James Robinson (right halfback), Louis Cecconi (left halfback) and Tony DiMatteo (fullback). Substitutes appearing in the game for Pitt were William Mihm, Robert Shanta, William Goelz, Morris Harris, Michael Boldin, Don Karanovich, William Coury, Anthony Razzano, Earl Sumpter, Ralph Coleman, Lee Ward, Leonard Radnor, Andrew Kisiday, William Hardisty, Walter Cummins, Jack Smodic, Carl DePasqua, Elmer Kozzora, Peter Fuderich, Lindaro Lauro, Robert Lee, Mark Maystrovich, Paul Rickards, John Ulam and Emil Rader.

Scoring summary

Quarter	Time	Drive			Team	Scoring information	Score	
Quarter	Time	Plays	Yards	TOP	Team	Scoring information	Notre Dame	Pittsburgh
1		5	57		Notre Dame	Terry Brennan 2-yard touchdown run, Fred Early kick good	7	0
2		7	21		Pittsburgh	Carl DePasqua 7-yard touchdown run, Louis Cecconi kick no good (blocked by Bill Wightkin)	7	6
2		7	80		Notre Dame	Doug Waybright 9-yard touchdown reception from Johnny Lujack, Fred Early kick no good (blocked by Wilbur Forsythe)	13	6
3		10	80		Notre Dame	James Martin 35-yard touchdown reception from Johnny Lujack, Fred Early kick good	20	6
4		5	61		Notre Dame	Leon Hart 33-yard touchdown reception from Johnny Lujack, Fred Early kick good	27	6
4		1	20		Notre Dame	Coy McGee 20-yard touchdown run, Fred Early kick no good (wide)	33	6
4		3	14		Notre Dame	Lancaster Smith 17-yard touchdown run, Fred Early kick good	40	6
"TOP" = time of possession. For other American football terms, see Glossary of American football.							40	6

=== at Michigan ===
Week 3: Pitt at Michigan

Team	1	2	3	4	Total
Pitt	0	0	0	0	0
• Michigan	0	20	21	28	69

- Date: October 11, 1947
- Location: Michigan Stadium
  Ann Arbor, MI
- Game start: 2:00 p.m.
- Game attendance: 59,964
- Game weather: sunny and warm
- Referee: Russell Rupp (Lebanon Valley)

On October 11, the Panthers traveled to Ann Arbor, MI to play the Michigan Wolverines for the second time. The 1941 Panthers came to Ann Arbor and lost 40–0. Tenth-year Coach Fritz Crisler's squad was 2–0, having beaten Michigan State (55–0) and Stanford (49–13). The Wolverine lineup had 6 All-Americans – halfbacks Bob Chappuis and Bump Elliott, end Bob Mann, tackle Bruce Hilkene, guard Dominic Tomasi, and center J. T. White. Tommy Devine of the Detroit Free Press wrote: "Another factor that may lead to increased playing time for the Wolverine starters is a desire on the part of the players to trim the Panthers more decisively than Notre Dame did a week ago....In the major national polls, Notre Dame is rated as the top team, with Michigan second."

The Pitt losing streak to Western Conference foes since 1940 was 0 for 22. Against the second-ranked team in the country, Coach Milligan's injury-depleted squad was a 50-point underdog. Third string quarterback, Tony Matich, started the game. Senior guard George Johnson was injured in the Notre Dame game and turned in his uniform. He was replaced by sophomore Anthony Razzano. Leonard Radnor replaced Ted Germenski at center. The Panther starting lineup consisted of seven sophomores and four juniors.

In front of 59,964 fans, the Pitt Panthers received the worst drubbing in their football history, as eight Wolverines combined to score ten touchdowns, and Jim Brieske added nine extra points for a 69–0 decision. The first period was scoreless, and then the Michigan offense took control. They made 23 first downs to the Panthers 1. They gained 293 yards rushing and added 234 yards passing on 11 for 20 completions. The Panthers gained 19 yards rushing, and 50 yards passing on 4 completions out of 20 attempts.

The Pitt starting lineup for the game against Michigan was Leo Skladaney (left end), Wilbur Forsythe (left tackle), Bernie Barkouskie (left guard), Leonard Radnor (center), Anthony Razzano (right guard), Robert Plotz (right tackle), William McPeak (right end), George Matich (quarterback), James Robinson (right halfback), Louis Cecconi (left halfback) and Tony DiMatteo (fullback). Substitutes appearing in the game for Pitt were Ted Geremski, William Samer, William Goelz, Michael Boldin, Don Karanovich, Morris Harris, Earl Sumpter, Frank Farrell, Ralph Coleman, Lee Ward, Andrew Kisiday, William Hardisty, Jack Smodic, Carl DePasqua, Elmer Kozzora, Peter Fuderich, Lindaro Lauro, Mark Maystrovich, John Ulam and Emil Rader.

Scoring summary

Quarter	Time	Drive			Team	Scoring information	Score	
Quarter	Time	Plays	Yards	TOP	Team	Scoring information	Pittsburgh	Michigan
2		1	70		Michigan	Bob Mann 70-yard touchdown reception from Bob Chappius, Jim Brieske kick no good (wide)	0	6
2		7	55		Michigan	Jack Weisenberger 3-yard touchdown run, Jim Brieske kick good	0	13
2		1	37		Michigan	Interception returned 37 yards for touchdown by Bump Elliott, Jim Brieske kick good	0	20
3		1	78		Michigan	Punt returned 78 yards for touchdown by Gene Derricotte, Jim Brieste kick good	0	27
3		8	52		Michigan	Bob Mann 23-yard touchdown reception from Jack Weisenberger, Jim Brieske kick good	0	34
3		13	67		Michigan	Walt Teninga 2-yard touchdown run, JIm Brieste kick good	0	41
4		8	56		Michigan	Walt Teninga 6-yard touchdown reception from Pete Elliott, Jim Brieske kick good	0	48
4		6	52		Michigan	Tom Peterson 4-yard touchdown run, Jim Brieste kick good	0	55
4		1	54		Michigan	Interception returned 54 yards for touchdown by Gene Derricotte intercepted, fumbled and Len Ford picked up the ball and scored, Jim Brieske kick good	0	62
4		3			Michigan	Don Kuick 16-yard touchdown reception from Pete Elliott, Jim Broeste kick good	0	69
"TOP" = time of possession. For other American football terms, see Glossary of American football.							0	69

=== at Indiana ===
Week 4: Pitt at Indiana

Team	1	2	3	4	Total
Pitt	0	0	6	0	6
• Indiana	0	21	6	14	41

- Date: October 18, 1947
- Location: Memorial Stadium
  Bloomington, IN
- Game start: 2:00 p.m.
- Game attendance: 25,000
- Game weather: hot and humid
- Referee: Mike Layden (Notre Dame)

On October 18, the Panthers played the Indiana Hoosiers for the fifth time. Indiana led the series 4–0 and had outscored the Panthers 105–13. Coach Bo McMillin's squad was 1–1–1, after beating Nebraska 17–0, tying Wisconsin 7–7, and losing to Iowa 27–14. Back George Taliaferro, future College Football Hall of Fame member, and guard Howard Brown gained All-America recognition.

After the Panthers extended their losing streak to 23 games versus the Western Conference and absorbed their worst loss in history, The Pitt News reported that the student body council held a meeting, and proposed to the powers to be that they do something to better the Pitt athletic situation. Bob Dickey, a member of the student congress and former football player, stated, "We've got to decide on some sort of remunerative system for the various athletic teams or get out of the big league." Jack Henry of the Sun-Telegraph reported that the school's response was "There is nothing in the situation that a victory wouldn't solve."

George Taliaferro ran for two touchdowns and threw two touchdown passes to lead the Hoosiers to a 41–6 victory over the Panthers. The Panthers lone score came in the third quarter on a 58-yard pass play from Lou Cecconi to Bill McPeak. The Panthers held Indiana scoreless in the first period, but gave up three touchdowns in the second, one in the third and two more in the fourth. Indiana finished the season with a 5–3–1 record.

The Pitt starting lineup for the game against Indiana was Leo Skladaney (left end), Wilbur Forsythe (left tackle), Ralph Coleman (left guard), Leonard Radnor (center), Anthony Razzano (right guard), Robert Plotz (right tackle), William McPeak (right end), Walter Cummins (quarterback), Jack Smodic (left halfback), Carl DePasqua (right halfback) and Tony DiMatteo (fullback). Substitutes appearing in the game for Pitt were Robert Shanta, William Samer, William Mihm, Frank Capello, James DeLong, Michael Boldin, Don Karanovich, Bernie Barkouskie, Earl Sumpter, Frank Farrell, William Coury, Lee Ward, Andrew Kisiday, Mark Maystrovich, William Hardisty, Peter Fuderich, Lindaro Lauro, John Ulam, Louis Cecconi, James Robinson and Paul Rickards.

Scoring summary

Quarter	Time	Drive			Team	Scoring information	Score	
Quarter	Time	Plays	Yards	TOP	Team	Scoring information	Pittsburgh	Indiana
2		4	69		Indiana	Dick Deranek 20-yard touchdown run, Rex Grossman kick good	0	7
2		3	44		Indiana	Mel Groomes 30-yard touchdown reception from George Taliaferro, Rex Grossman kick good	0	14
2		5	98		Indiana	Harry Jagade 47-yard touchdown reception from George Taliaferro, Rex Grossman kick good	0	21
3		1	20		Indiana	Interception returned 20 yards for touchdown by Lou Mihajlovich, Rex Grossman kick no good (blocked by Walt Cummins)	0	27
3		10	90		Pittsburgh	Bill McPeak 58-yard touchdown reception from Lou Cecconi, Lou Cecconi kick no good	6	27
4			62		Indiana	George Taliaferro 1-yard touchdown run, Rex Grossman kick good	6	34
4					Indiana	George Taliaferro 3-yard touchdown run, Rex Grossman kick good	6	41
"TOP" = time of possession. For other American football terms, see Glossary of American football.							6	41

=== Ohio State ===
Week 5: Ohio State at Pitt

Team	1	2	3	4	Total
Ohio State	0	0	0	0	0
• Pitt	0	6	0	6	12

- Date: October 25, 1947
- Location: Pitt Stadium
  Pittsburgh, PA
- Game start: 2:00 p.m.
- Game attendance: 55,217
- Game weather: cloudy and mild
- Referee: Lloyd Larson (Wisconsin)

The 1947 Homecoming game was against ex-Panthers coach Wes Fesler's Ohio State Buckeyes. State led the series 8–2–1. The Buckeyes had won the past seven, outscoring the Panthers 244–78. The Buckeyes were 1–2–1 on the season, having beaten Missouri, losing to Purdue and USC, and tying Iowa. Fesler was concerned: "Anyone who figures we have an edge on Pittsburgh is crazy. This is their big game. It's homecoming. Since I was their coach last year, this is the game the Pitt boys want to win."

Coach Milligan made some lineup changes. Guard Bernie Barkouskie returned from injury. Earl Sumpter started in place of injured Anthony Razzano at the other guard position, and Lindy Lauro started at fullback. Homecoming festivities included releasing 1000 homing pigeons prior to the game, and a Battle of Music between the marching bands. Pitt graduates, Gene Kelly and Regis Toomey, who were now Hollywood celebrities, attended the game.

The two-touchdown underdog Panthers shocked the 55,217 fans in attendance with a 12–0 victory over the Buckeyes. With less than 2 minutes remaining in the first quarter, the Panthers gained possession on the Ohio State 29-yard line. Three pass completions took the ball to the 5-yard line. Tony Matteo needed two downs to score. Lou Cecconi's placement was blocked by Fred Morrison. Pitt led 6–0 at halftime. The Buckeyes drove to the Panthers 2-yard line in the third quarter, but the Pitt defense held on downs. Pitt added the final score in the last quarter. After gaining possession on the Ohio 30-yard line, the Pitt offense worked the ball to the 4-yard line. Carl DePasqua threw a touchdown pass to Lou Cecconi. Pitt led 12–0, as Cecconi's placement went wide. Pitt finally beat a Western Conference team.

The Pitt starting lineup for the game against Ohio State was Leo Skladany (left end), Wilbur Forsythe (left tackle), Bernie Barkouskie (left guard), Leonard Radnor (center), Earl Sumpter (right guard), Robert Plotz (right tackle), William McPeak (right end), Walter Cummins (quarterback), Louis Cecconi (left halfback), James Robinson (right halfback) and Lindaro Lauro (fullback). Substitutes appearing in the game for Pitt were Robert Shanta, William Samer, William Mihm, Frank Capello, Ted Geremski, William Goelz, Michael Boldin, Don Karanovich, Ralph Coleman, Frank Farrell, Charles Thomas, Lee Ward, William Hardisty, Peter Fuderich, Emil Rader, George Matich, Robert Lee, Jack Smodic, Carl DePasqua, Tony DiMatteo and Paul Rickards.

Scoring summary

Quarter	Time	Drive			Team	Scoring information	Score	
Quarter	Time	Plays	Yards	TOP	Team	Scoring information	Ohio State	Pittsburgh
2		6	29		Indiana	Tony DiMatteo 3-yard touchdown run, Lou Cecconi kick no good (blocked by Fred Morrison)	0	6
4		10	30		Indiana	Lou Cecconi 4-yard touchdown reception from Carl DePasqua, Lou Cecconi kick no good (wide)	0	12
"TOP" = time of possession. For other American football terms, see Glossary of American football.							0	12

=== at Minnesota ===
Week 6: Pitt at Minnesota

Team	1	2	3	4	Total
Pitt	0	0	0	0	0
• Minnesota	6	0	0	23	29

- Date: November 1, 1947
- Location: Memorial Stadium
  Minneapolis, MN
- Game start: 2:00 p.m.
- Game attendance: 56,334
- Game weather: partly cloudy
- Referee: Dave Noble (Nebraska)

On November 1, the Panthers traveled to Minneapolis to play Bernie Bierman's Minnesota Gophers for the fifth time. Minnesota led the series 4–0 and had outscored the Panthers 109–17. The Gophers opened the season with a three game win streak, but then lost two straight. Leo Nomellini, a future Pro Football Hall of Famer, was the starting tackle.

The Panthers' train departed at 11:00 pm on Thursday night. They arrived in Chicago on Friday morning and worked out on Stagg Field. They reboarded the train before noon, and arrived in Minneapolis at 8:30 Friday night. The team was housed at the Curtis Hotel. Starting end, Leo Skladany was injured in the Ohio State game and was replaced by Frank Capello. Paul Rickards started at fullback in place of Lindy Lauro. Coach Milligan told reporters: "We have to depend on a passing game. Minnesota is too big for us to knock down and run over."

The 21-point underdog Panthers held the Gophers to one touchdown through the first three quarters, but Minnesota scored three touchdowns and added a safety in the final stanza to defeat Pitt 29–0. Bill Elliott, Marvin Hein, Ralph McAlister and Frank Brown each scored a touchdown. Don Bailey kicked three extra points, and Jack Stuhlman tackled Pitt fullback Paul Rickards in the end zone for a safety. The Panthers offense advanced to the Minnesota 19-yard line as time elapsed in the first half. They did not threaten to score again, and their defense wore down in the final 15 minutes.

The Pitt starting lineup for the game against Minnesota was Frank Capello (left end), Wilbur Forsythe (left tackle), Bernie Barkouskie (left guard), Leonard Radnor (center), Earl Sumpter (right guard), Robert Plotz (right tackle), William McPeak (right end), Walter Cummins (quarterback), Tony DiMatteo (left halfback), James Robinson (right halfback) and Paul Rickards (fullback). Substitutes appearing in the game for Pitt were Robert Shanta, William Samer, William Mihm, Ted Geremski, Sam DeFede, Michael Boldin, Don Karanovich, Ralph Coleman, Morris Harris, Frank Farrell, Charles Thomas, Lee Ward, Peter Fuderich, William Bruno, Robert Lee, Jack Smodic, Carl DePasqua, Louis Cecconi, William Hardisty and Lindaro Lauro.

Scoring summary

Quarter	Time	Drive			Team	Scoring information	Score	
Quarter	Time	Plays	Yards	TOP	Team	Scoring information	Pittsburgh	Minnesota
1		8	42		Minnesota	Bill Elliott 1-yard touchdown run, Don Bailey kick no good (blocked by Frank Capello)	0	6
4		7	46		Minnesota	Marvin Hein 4-yard touchdown reception from Jim Malosky, Don Bailey kick good	0	13
4		1			Minnesota	Jack Stuhlman tackled Paul Rickards in end zone	0	15
4		6	37		Minnesota	Ralph McAlister 15-yard touchdown run, Don Bailey kick good	0	22
4		4	23		Minnesota	Frank Brown 16-yard touchdown run, Don Bailey kick good	0	29
"TOP" = time of possession. For other American football terms, see Glossary of American football.							0	29

=== at Purdue ===
Week 7: Pitt at Purdue

Team	1	2	3	4	Total
Pitt	0	0	0	0	0
• Purdue	0	7	7	14	28

- Date: November 15, 1947
- Location: Ross-Ade Stadium
  Lafayette, IN
- Game start: 2:00 p.m.
- Game attendance: 19,000
- Game weather: partly cloudy
- Referee: Bernard Darling (Beloit)

The Panthers fifth and final midwest road trip of the season took them to Lafayette, IN to play the Purdue Boilermakers. Purdue led the all-time series 3–0. First-year Coach Stu Holcomb's squad was 4–3 for the season. Halfback Harry Szulborski received All-American mention. Future pro football coaches, Abe Gibron and Hank Stram, were on the squad.

The Panthers rode the overnight train to Indianapolis, and enjoyed breakfast at the Claypool Hotel before bussing to Lafayette. The Panthers continued to have injury problems. Starting tackle Robert Plotz was injured in the Minnesota game and was lost for the season. Freshman Mike Boldin replaced him. Halfback Tony DiMatteo did not make the trip. Coach Milligan named Carl DePasqua and Bobby Lee starting halfbacks. Sophomore Lee Ward replaced Len Radnor at center.

The travel-weary Panthers were overwhelmed by the Purdue attack and lost 28–0. Pitt garnered 2 first downs and 54 total yards versus Purdue's 18 first downs and 371 total yards. After a scoreless first quarter, Purdue end, Clyde Grimenstein intercepted a Paul Rickards pass and raced 43-yards for the touchdown. Art Haverstock booted the point after and Purdue led at halftime 7–0. In the third quarter, Bob DeMoss scored from the 2-yard line to end a 6-play, 65-yard drive. The Boilermakers added two touchdowns in the final period and Art Haverstock converted the placements.

The Pitt starting lineup for the game against Purdue was Frank Capello (left end), Wilbur Forsythe (left tackle), Bernie Barkouskie (left guard), Lee Ward (center), Earl Sumpter (right guard), Robert Plotz (right tackle), William McPeak (right end), Walter Cummins (quarterback), Robert Lee (left halfback), Carl DePasqua (right halfback) and Paul Rickards (fullback). Substitutes appearing in the game for Pitt were Leo Skladaney, William Mihm, William Goelz, James DeLong, Don Karanovich, Ralph Coleman, William Coury, Leonard Radnor, Donald Fisher, William Bruno, William Hardisty, Jack Smodic, James Robinson, John Ulam, Louis Cecconi, Fred Botti, Joe Cherol, Paul Rickards, Peter Fuderich and Robert Becker.

Scoring summary

Quarter	Time	Drive			Team	Scoring information	Score	
Quarter	Time	Plays	Yards	TOP	Team	Scoring information	Pittsburgh	Purdue
2		1	43		Purduer	Interception returned 43 yards for touchdown by Clyde Grimenstein, Art Haverstock kick good	0	7
3		6	65		Purdue	Bob DeMoss 2-yard touchdown run, Art Haverstock kick good	0	14
4		3	3		Purdue	Bob Pfohl 6-yard touchdown run, Art Haverstock kick good	0	21
4		4	32		Purdue	Bill Canfield 24-yard touchdown reception from Bob Hartman, Art Haverstock kick good	0	28
"TOP" = time of possession. For other American football terms, see Glossary of American football.							0	28

=== Penn State ===
Week 8: Penn State at Pitt

Team	1	2	3	4	Total
• Penn State	6	7	7	9	29
Pitt	0	0	0	0	0

- Date: November 22, 1947
- Location: Pitt Stadium
  Pittsburgh, PA
- Game start: 2:00 p.m.
- Game attendance: 53,000
- Game weather: cloudy
- Referee: Joseph H. Williams (Bucknell)

On November 22, the Penn State Nittany Lions came to Pittsburgh with the sole purpose of giving their coach, 18-year veteran Bob Higgins, an undefeated season. State, a two-touchdown favorite, came into the game with an 8–0 record, having outscored their opponents 290–27. Pitt led the all-time series 27–17–2 and won the past three meetings. Penn State guard Steve Suhey earned All-American honors. Coach Higgins remained cautious: "Pitt has always given us trouble."

Coach Milligan had three starters back in the lineup: end Leo Skladany, halfback Tony DiMatteo and fullback Bill Bruno. Pitt's lineup was made up of all underclassmen, while the Lions started 5 seniors and had more veteran reserves.

Penn State finished their season undefeated as they shut out the Panthers 29–0. Pitt generated no offense, as the Penn State defense held them to only 5 first downs and 43 total yards. State scored a touchdown in each quarter. Halfback Bobby Williams scored the first two and end Ed Czekaj added a placement to give the Nittanies a 13–0 lead at halftime. In the third period, State fullback Fran Rogel ran off-tackle 20 yards, and while getting tackled, he lateraled the ball to halfback Elwood Petchel, "who galloped unhindered into the end zone." Czekaj converted the placement. Then, Pitt halfback Bob Lee fumbled into the arms of State end Dennie Hoggard and he ran 21 yards for the final touchdown. Ed Czekaj made up for missing the extra point by kicking a 21-yard field goal for the final points of the game.

The Pitt starting lineup for the game against Penn State was Leo Skladaney (left end), Wilbur Forsythe (left tackle), Bernie Barkouskie (left guard), Lee Ward (center), Earl Sumpter (right guard), Michael Boldin (right tackle), William McPeak (right end), Walter Cummins (quarterback), Tony DiMatteo (left halfback), Carl DePasqua (right halfback) and William Bruno (fullback). Substitutes appearing in the game for Pitt were Frank Capello, William Mihm, Sam Haddad, James DeLong, Don Karanovich, Donald Fisher, William Hardisty, Jack Smodic, James Robinson, Lindaro Lauro, Louis Cecconi, Paul Rickards, Peter Fuderich and Robert Becker.

Scoring summary

Quarter	Time	Drive			Team	Scoring information	Score	
Quarter	Time	Plays	Yards	TOP	Team	Scoring information	Penn State	Pittsburgh
1		8	55		Penn State	Bobby Williams 3-yard touchdown run, Ed Czekaj kick no good	6	0
2		8	28		Penn State	Bobby Williams 5-yard touchdown run, Ed Czekaj kick good	13	0
3		6	78		Penn State	Fran Rogel and Elwood Petchel 46-yard touchdown run, Ed Czekaj kick good	20	0
4		1	21		Penn State	Fumble recovery returned yards for touchdown by Dennie Hoggard, kick no good	26	0
4		5	28		Penn State	21-yard field goal by Ed Czekaj	29	0
"TOP" = time of possession. For other American football terms, see Glossary of American football.							29	0

=== West Virginia ===
Week 9: West Virginia at Pitt

Team	1	2	3	4	Total
• West Virginia	7	10	0	0	17
Pitt	0	0	0	2	2

- Date: November 29, 1947
- Location: Pitt Stadium
  Pittsburgh, PA
- Game start: 2:00 p.m.
- Game attendance: 15,000
- Game weather: very cold
- Referee: William T. Halloran (unattached)

The Panthers ended their worst season with the annual “Backyard Brawl” versus West Virginia. Pitt led the all-time series 30–8–1, having won the past 15. Coach Bill Kern's Mountaineers were 5–4 with two reasons to beat the Panthers - to break the losing streak, and to send their retiring coach out on a positive note.

At a banquet held on Friday night prior to the game, Jock Sutherland told the attendees about the difficulties of the de-emphasis with the 1947 schedule: "Milligan had to play the Chicago Bears every weekend. I don't know anyone who could have done a better job than he did." Coach Milligan changed his backfield for the Mountaineers. Bob Becker was at fullback and Bobby Lee was back at left halfback.

The Mountaineers ended their 15 game losing streak to the Panthers with a 17–2 victory. West Virginia scored in the opening quarter on a 6-play, 43-yard drive. Thomas Keane went over tackle from the 1-yard line, and Dick Hoffman added the point after. Early in the second period, Hoffman added an 18-yard field goal. Then, a 25-yard touchdown pass from Keane to Alva Richmond was called back for backfield in motion. The next play was a 30-yard touchdown heave that bounced off the fingers of Pitt back Jack Smodic, and landed in the hands of Bernie Huntz. Hoffman's placement gave the Mountaineers a 17–0 lead at halftime. The only scoring in the second half was a safety on the final play of the game. The Panthers blocked Keane's punt and Mountaineers' tackle Gene Remenar fell on it for a safety.

Coach Kern was pleased: "West Virginia waited a long time for this one. We played a nice game and I'm proud of the boys." Coach Milligan concurred: "My boys played a whale of a game, but that West Virginia club is a good team. I'm certainly glad this was the last game of the season."

The Pitt starting lineup for the game against West Virginia was Leo Skladany (left end), Wilbur Forsythe (left tackle), Bernie Barkouskie (left guard), Ted Geremski (center), Earl Sumpter (right guard), Michael Boldin (right tackle), William McPeak (right end), Walter Cummins (quarterback), Robert Lee (left halfback), Carl DePasqua (right halfback) and Robert Becker (fullback). Substitutes appearing in the game for Pitt were William Mihm, Sam Haddad, James DeLong, William Coury, Charles Thomas, Donald Fisher, William Bruno, William Hardisty, Anthony DiMatteo, Jack Smodic, Lindaro Lauro, James Robinson, John Ulam, Louis Cecconi.

Scoring summary

Quarter	Time	Drive			Team	Scoring information	Score	
Quarter	Time	Plays	Yards	TOP	Team	Scoring information	West Virginia	Pittsburgh
1		6	43		West Virginia	Thomas Keane 1-yard touchdown run, Dick Hoffman kick good	7	0
2		4	5		West Virginia	18-yard field goal by Dick Hoffman	10	0
2		4	25		West Virginia	Bernie Huntz 30-yard touchdown reception from Thomas Keane, Dick Hoffman kick good	17	0
4		2	4		Pittsburgh	Blocked punt recovered by Gene Remenar	17	2
"TOP" = time of possession. For other American football terms, see Glossary of American football.							17	2

== Individual scoring summary ==
1947 Pittsburgh Panthers scoring summary
Player	Touchdowns	Extra points	Field goals	Safety	Points
Carl DePasqua	1	0	0	1	8
Louis Cecconi	1	0	0	0	6
William McPeak	1	0	0	0	6
Tony DiMatteo	1	0	0	0	6
Totals	4	0	0	1	26

== Team players drafted into the NFL ==
The following players were selected in the 1948 NFL draft.

Player	Position	Round	Pick	NFL club
Bill McPeak	end	16	142	Pittsburgh Steelers
Tony DiMatteo	Back	32	299	Pittsburgh Steelers
