= 1947 Dartmouth Indians football team =

American college football season

1947 Dartmouth Indians football
- Conference: Independent
- Record: 4–4–1
- Head coach: Tuss McLaughry (5th season)
- Home stadium: Memorial Field

1947 Ivy Group football standings
	Conf.					Overall
Team	W		L		T	W		L		T
No. 7 Penn	4	–	0	–	0	7	–	0	–	1
Princeton	4	–	2	–	0	5	–	3	–	0
Yale	3	–	2	–	0	6	–	3	–	0
No. 20 Columbia	2	–	2	–	0	7	–	2	–	0
Harvard	1	–	3	–	0	4	–	5	–	0
Brown	1	–	3	–	0	4	–	4	–	1
Dartmouth	3	–	4	–	0	4	–	4	–	1
Cornell	1	–	4	–	0	4	–	5	–	0
Rankings from AP Poll

The 1947 Dartmouth Indians football team represented Dartmouth College during the 1947 college football season. In its fifth season under head coach Tuss McLaughry, the team compiled a 4–4–1 record and was outscored by a total of 127 to 102.

Dartmouth was ranked at No. 66 (out of 500 college football teams) in the final Litkenhous Ratings for 1947.

The team played its home games at Memorial Field in Hanover, New Hampshire.

== Schedule ==
Date	Opponent	Site	Result	Attendance	Source
September 27	at Holy Cross	Fitton Field; Worcester, MA	T 0–0	22,000	
October 4	at Syracuse	Archbold Stadium; Syracuse, NY	W 28–7	18,000	
October 11	No. 7 Penn	Memorial Field; Hanover, NH	L 0–32	12,000	
October 18	Brown	Memorial Field; Hanover, NH	W 13–10	10,000	
October 25	at Harvard	Harvard Stadium; Boston, MA (rivalry)	W 14–13	35,000	
November 1	at Yale	Yale Bowl; New Haven, CT	L 14–23	63,000	
November 8	at No. 17 Columbia	Baker Field; New York, NY	L 0–15	10,000	
November 15	Cornell	Memorial Field; Hanover, NH (rivalry)	W 21–13	13,000	
November 22	at Princeton	Palmer Stadium; Princeton, NJ	L 12–14	26,000	
Rankings from AP Poll released prior to the game
