= 1947 Columbia Lions football team =

American college football season

1947 Columbia Lions football
- Conference: Independent

Ranking
- AP: No. 20
- Record: 7–2
- Head coach: Lou Little (18th season)
- Home stadium: Baker Field

1947 Ivy Group football standings
	Conf.					Overall
Team	W		L		T	W		L		T
No. 7 Penn	4	–	0	–	0	7	–	0	–	1
Princeton	4	–	2	–	0	5	–	3	–	0
Yale	3	–	2	–	0	6	–	3	–	0
No. 20 Columbia	2	–	2	–	0	7	–	2	–	0
Harvard	1	–	3	–	0	4	–	5	–	0
Brown	1	–	3	–	0	4	–	4	–	1
Dartmouth	3	–	4	–	0	4	–	4	–	1
Cornell	1	–	4	–	0	4	–	5	–	0
Rankings from AP Poll

The 1947 Columbia Lions football team was an American football team that represented the Columbia University during the 1947 college football season. In its 18th season under head coach Lou Little, the team compiled a 7–2 record, was ranked No. 20 in the final AP Poll, and outscored opponents by a total of 170 to 113.

Columbia's victory over No. 6 Army on October 25, 1947, broke the Cadets' 32-game unbeaten streak dating back to November 1943.

Columbia end Bill Swiacki was a consensus first-team All-American; he also finished eighth in the 1947 voting for the Heisman Trophy.

== Schedule ==
Date	Opponent	Rank	Site	Result	Attendance	Source
September 27	Rutgers		Baker Field; New York, NY	W 40–28	23,000	
October 4	at Navy		Thompson Stadium; Annapolis, MD	W 13–6	22,000	
October 11	No. 14 Yale	No. 11	Baker Field; New York, NY	L 7–17	35,000	
October 18	at No. 8 Penn		Franklin Field; Philadelphia, PA	L 14–34	70,000	
October 25	No. 6 Army		Baker Field; New York, NY	W 21–20	35,000	
November 1	at Cornell	No. 20	Schoellkopf Field; Ithaca, NY	W 22–0	25,000	
November 8	Dartmouth	No. 17	Baker Field; New York, NY	W 15–0	10,000	
November 15	Holy Cross		Baker Field; New York, NY	W 10–0	28,000	
November 22	Syracuse	No. 19	Baker Field; New York, NY	W 28–8	22,000	
Rankings from AP Poll released prior to the game

== Rankings ==
Ranking movements Legend: ██ Increase in ranking ██ Decrease in ranking — = Not ranked ( ) = First-place votes
	Week									
Poll	1	2	3	4	5	6	7	8	9	Final
AP	11	—	—	20	17	—	19	16 (1)	—	20
