= 1947 Chattanooga Moccasins football team =

American college football season

1947 Chattanooga Moccasins football
- Conference: Independent
- Record: 4–6
- Head coach: Scrappy Moore (17th season)
- Captain: John Kovacevich
- Home stadium: Chamberlain Field

1947 Southern major college football independents records
| | Conf. | | | Overall |
| Team | W | L | T | W | | L | | T |
|---|---|---|---|---|---|---|---|---|
| Virginia | | – | | 7 | – | 3 | – | 0 |
| West Virginia | | – | | 6 | – | 4 | – | 0 |
| Georgetown | | – | | 3 | – | 4 | – | 1 |
| Chattanooga | | – | | 4 | – | 6 | – | 0 |
| Miami (FL) | | – | | 2 | – | 7 | – | 0 |
| Navy | | – | | 1 | – | 7 | – | 1 |

The 1947 Chattanooga Moccasins football team was an American football team that represented the University of Chattanooga during the 1947 college football season. In its 17th year under head coach Scrappy Moore, the team compiled a 4–6 record and was outscored by a total of 179 to 111.

Chattanooga was ranked at No. 118 (out of 500 college football teams) in the final Litkenhous Ratings for 1947.

The team played its home games at Chamberlain Field in Chattanooga, Tennessee.

== Schedule ==
| Date | Opponent | Site | Result | Attendance | Source |
|---|---|---|---|---|---|
| September 26 | Mississippi State | Chamberlain Field; Chattanooga, TN | L 0–19 | 10,000 | |
| October 3 | Tennessee Tech | Chamberlain Field; Chattanooga, TN | W 12–0 | | |
| October 11 | at Tennessee | Shields–Watkins Field; Knoxville, TN | L 7–26 | 20,000 | |
| October 18 | at Centenary | Fairgrounds Stadium; Shreveport, LA | W 20–0 | 9,000 | |
| October 24 | Dayton | Chamberlain Field; Chattanooga, TN | W 19–13 | 6,000 | |
| November 1 | at NC State | Riddick Stadium; Raleigh, NC | L 0–21 | | |
| November 8 | Union (TN) | Chamberlain Field; Chattanooga, TN | W 46–7 | | |
| November 15 | at No. 15 Ole Miss | Hemingway Stadium; Oxford, MS | L 0–52 | | |
| November 22 | Georgia | Chamberlain Field; Chattanooga, TN | L 0–27 | 5,000 | |
| November 27 | North Texas State Teachers | Chamberlain Field; Chattanooga, TN | L 7–14 | 6,000 | |
Rankings from AP Poll released prior to the game
