= 1947 Brown Bears football team =

American college football season

1947 Brown Bears football
- Conference: Independent
- Record: 4–4–1
- Head coach: Rip Engle (4th season)
- Home stadium: Brown Stadium

1947 Ivy Group football standings
	Conf.					Overall
Team	W		L		T	W		L		T
No. 7 Penn	4	–	0	–	0	7	–	0	–	1
Princeton	4	–	2	–	0	5	–	3	–	0
Yale	3	–	2	–	0	6	–	3	–	0
No. 20 Columbia	2	–	2	–	0	7	–	2	–	0
Harvard	1	–	3	–	0	4	–	5	–	0
Brown	1	–	3	–	0	4	–	4	–	1
Dartmouth	3	–	4	–	0	4	–	4	–	1
Cornell	1	–	4	–	0	4	–	5	–	0
Rankings from AP Poll

The 1947 Brown Bears football team was an American football team that represented the Brown University during the 1947 college football season. In its fourth season under head coach Rip Engle, the team compiled a 4–4–1 record and outscored opponents by a total of 185 to 139.

Brown was ranked at No. 79 (out of 500 college football teams) in the final Litkenhous Ratings for 1947.

The team played its home games at Brown Stadium in Providence, Rhode Island

== Schedule ==
Date	Opponent	Site	Result	Attendance	Source
September 27	Connecticut	Brown Stadium; Providence, RI	W 33–13	15,000	
October 4	at Princeton	Palmer Stadium; Princeton, NJ	L 7–21	25,000	
October 11	Rhode Island State	Brown Stadium; Providence, RI	W 55–6	15,000	
October 18	at Dartmouth	Memorial Field; Hanover, NH	L 10–13	10,000	
October 25	at Colgate	Colgate Athletic Field; Hamilton, NY	T 13–13	6,000	
November 1	Holy Cross	Brown Stadium; Providence, RI	W 20–19	18,000	
November 8	at No. 20 Yale	Yale Bowl; New Haven, CT	W 20–14	15,000	
November 15	at Harvard	Harvard Stadium; Boston, MA	L 7–13	25,000	
November 27	Rutgers	Brown Stadium; Providence, RI	L 20–27	16,000	
Rankings from AP Poll released prior to the game
