= Reaves Baysinger =

American football player and coach (1902–1994)

Biographical details
- Born: February 22, 1902; Doylestown, Ohio, U.S.
- Died: December 4, 1994 (aged 92); Rochester, New York, U.S.

Playing career

Football
- 1921–1923: Syracuse
- 1924: Rochester Jeffersons
- Positions: Guard, end (football); Point guard (basketball); Outfielder (baseball)

Coaching career (HC unless noted)

Football
- 1947–1948: Syracuse

Basketball
- 1927: Syracuse (freshmen)

Head coaching record
- Overall: 4–14

Reaves Henry Baysinger (February 22, 1902 – December 4, 1994) was the head football coach at Syracuse from 1947 to 1948. Despite his strong ties to the university he only produced a 4–14 (.222) record. On a higher note, in 1927, he coached the freshman basketball team to an undefeated 23–0 record.

Baysinger played college football as a guard and end at Syracuse. During his senior season, he was an honorable mention all-American. He also played basketball as a point guard, and baseball as an outfielder. Baysinger played one game in the NFL as a member of the Rochester Jeffersons in 1924. He died in 1994.

== Head coaching record ==
Year	Team	Overall	Conference	Standing	Bowl/playoffs
Syracuse Orangemen (Independent) (1947–1948)
1947	Syracuse	3–6			
1948	Syracuse	1–8			
Syracuse:		4–14			
Total:		4–14			
