= 1947 Miami Hurricanes football team =

American college football season

1947 Miami Hurricanes football
- Conference: Independent
- Record: 2–7–1
- Head coach: Jack Harding (9th season)
- Home stadium: Burdine Stadium

1947 Southern major college football independents records
| | Conf. | | | Overall |
| Team | W | L | T | W | | L | | T |
|---|---|---|---|---|---|---|---|---|
| Virginia | | – | | 7 | – | 3 | – | 0 |
| West Virginia | | – | | 6 | – | 4 | – | 0 |
| Georgetown | | – | | 3 | – | 4 | – | 1 |
| Chattanooga | | – | | 4 | – | 6 | – | 0 |
| Miami (FL) | | – | | 2 | – | 7 | – | 0 |
| Navy | | – | | 1 | – | 7 | – | 1 |

The 1947 Miami Hurricanes football team was an American football team that represented the University of Miami as an independent during the 1947 college football season. In its ninth and final season under head coach Jack Harding, the team compiled a 2–7–1 record and was outscored by a total of 140 to 80.

Miami was ranked at No. 87 (out of 500 college football teams) in the final Litkenhous Ratings for 1947.

The team played its home games at Burdine Stadium in Miami, Florida.

== Schedule ==
| Date | Opponent | Site | Result | Attendance | Source |
|---|---|---|---|---|---|
| September 26 | Baylor | Burdine Stadium; Miami, FL | L 7–18 | 31,717 | |
| October 3 | at Villanova | Shibe Park; Philadelphia, PA | T 7–7 | 26,500 | |
| October 10 | TCU | Burdine Stadium; Miami, FL | L 6–19 | 28,686 | |
| October 17 | Rollins | Burdine Stadium; Miami, FL | W 6–0 | 24,403 | |
| October 24 | George Washington | Burdine Stadium; Miami, FL | W 28–7 | 25,746 | |
| October 31 | South Carolina | Burdine Stadium; Miami, FL | L 0–8 | 28,454 | |
| November 8 | at Cincinnati | Nippert Stadium; Cincinnati, OH | L 7–20 | 31,000 | |
| November 14 | Vanderbilt | Burdine Stadium; Miami, FL | L 7–33 | 29,717 | |
| November 22 | Florida | Burdine Stadium; Miami, FL (rivalry) | L 6–7 | 32,102 | |
| November 29 | No. 6 Alabama | Burdine Stadium; Miami, FL | L 6–21 | 27,941 | |
Rankings from AP Poll released prior to the game
