= 1947 Navy Midshipmen football team =

American college football season

1947 Navy Midshipmen football
- Conference: Independent
- Record: 1–7–1
- Head coach: Tom Hamilton (5th season)
- Captain: Dick Scott
- Home stadium: Thompson Stadium

1947 Southern major college football independents records
	Conf.			Overall
Team	W	L	T	W		L		T
Virginia		–		7	–	3	–	0
West Virginia		–		6	–	4	–	0
Georgetown		–		3	–	4	–	1
Chattanooga		–		4	–	6	–	0
Miami (FL)		–		2	–	7	–	0
Navy		–		1	–	7	–	1

The 1947 Navy Midshipmen football team was an American football team that represented the United States Naval Academy as an independent during the 1947 college football season. In its fifth non-consecutive season under head coach Tom Hamilton, the team compiled a 1–7–1 record and was outscored by a total of 165 to 86.

Navy was ranked at No. 32 (out of 500 college football teams) in the final Litkenhous Ratings for 1947.

== Schedule ==
Date	Opponent	Site	Result	Attendance	Source
September 27	at California	California Memorial Stadium; Berkeley, CA	L 7–14	80,000	
October 4	Columbia	Thompson Stadium; Annapolis, MD	L 6–13	22,000	
October 11	vs. No. 13 Duke	Municipal Stadium; Baltimore, MD	T 14–14	35,000	
October 18	at Cornell	Schoellkopf Field; Ithaca, NY	W 38–19		
October 25	at No. 8 Penn	Franklin Field; Philadelphia, PA	L 0–21	80,000	
November 1	vs. No. 1 Notre Dame	Municipal Stadium; Cleveland, OH (rivalry)	L 0–27	84,117	
November 8	Georgia Tech	Municipal Stadium; Baltimore, MD	L 14–16	35,000	
November 15	No. 8 Penn State	Municipal Stadium; Baltimore, MD	L 7–20	25,000	
November 29	vs. No. 12 Army	Philadelphia Municipal Stadium; Philadelphia, PA (Army–Navy Game)	L 0–21	103,000	
Rankings from AP Poll released prior to the game
