= 1947 Virginia Cavaliers football team =

American college football season

1947 Virginia Cavaliers football
- Conference: Independent
- Record: 7–3
- Head coach: Art Guepe (2nd season)
- Captain: H. Lockwood Frizzell
- Home stadium: Scott Stadium

1947 Southern major college football independents records
	Conf.			Overall
Team	W	L	T	W		L		T
Virginia		–		7	–	3	–	0
West Virginia		–		6	–	4	–	0
Georgetown		–		3	–	4	–	1
Chattanooga		–		4	–	6	–	0
Miami (FL)		–		2	–	7	–	0
Navy		–		1	–	7	–	1

The 1947 Virginia Cavaliers football team was an American football team that represented the University of Virginia as an independent during the 1947 college football season. In its second season under head coach Art Guepe, the team compiled a 7–3 record and outscored opponents by a total of 370 to 261.

Virginia was ranked at No. 26 (out of 500 college football teams) in the final Litkenhous Ratings for 1947.

The team played its home games at Scott Stadium in Charlottesville, Virginia.

== Schedule ==
Date	Opponent	Rank	Site	Result	Attendance	Source
September 27	George Washington		Scott Stadium; Charlottesville, VA	W 33–13	15,000	
October 4	vs. VPI		Victory Stadium; Roanoke, VA (rivalry)	W 41–7	22,000	
October 11	Harvard^{†}		Scott Stadium; Charlottesville, VA	W 47–0	24,000	
October 18	Washington and Lee	No. 16	Scott Stadium; Charlottesville, VA	W 32–7	12,000	
October 25	at VMI	No. 13	Wilson Field; Lexington, VA	W 35–6	12,000	
November 1	Richmond	No. 12	Scott Stadium; Charlottesville, VA	W 34–0	12,000	
November 8	at No. 4 Penn	No. 10	Franklin Field; Philadelphia, PA	L 7–19	79,000	
November 15	at West Virginia	No. 15	Mountaineer Field; Morgantown, WV	W 6–0	18,000	
November 22	NC State	No. 16	Scott Stadium; Charlottesville, VA	L 2–7	20,000	
November 29	at No. 10 North Carolina		Kenan Memorial Stadium; Chapel Hill, NC (South's Oldest Rivalry)	L 7–40	40,000	
^{†}Homecoming; Rankings from AP Poll released prior to the game

== Rankings ==
Ranking movements Legend: ██ Increase in ranking ██ Decrease in ranking — = Not ranked т = Tied with team above or below
	Week									
Poll	1	2	3	4	5	6	7	8	9	Final
AP	—	16	13	12	10	15т	16	—	—	—
