= 1947 Holy Cross Crusaders football team =

American college football season

1947 Holy Cross Crusaders football
- Conference: Independent
- Record: 4–4–2
- Head coach: Ox DaGrosa (3rd season)
- Home stadium: Fitton Field

1947 Eastern major college football independents records
	Conf.			Overall
Team	W	L	T	W		L		T
No. 4 Penn State		–		9	–	0	–	1
No. 11 Army		–		5	–	2	–	2
Villanova		–		6	–	3	–	1
Boston University		–		5	–	3	–	0
Boston College		–		5	–	4	–	0
Holy Cross		–		4	–	4	–	2
Syracuse		–		3	–	6	–	0
Temple		–		3	–	6	–	0
NYU		–		2	–	5	–	1
Colgate		–		1	–	5	–	2
Duquesne		–		2	–	8	–	0
Fordham		–		1	–	6	–	1
Merchant Marine		–		2	–	9	–	0
Pittsburgh		–		1	–	8	–	0
Rankings from AP Poll

The 1947 Holy Cross Crusaders football team was an American football team represented the College of the Holy Cross as an independent during the 1947 college football season. In its third and final season under head coach Ox DaGrosa, the team compiled a 4–4–2 record and outscored opponents by a total of 144 to 75.

Holy Cross was ranked at No. 61 (out of 500 college football teams) in the final Litkenhous Ratings for 1947.

The team played its home games at Fitton Field in Worcester, Massachusetts.

== Schedule ==
Date	Opponent	Site	Result	Attendance	Source
September 27	Dartmouth	Fitton Field; Worcester, MA	T 0–0	22,000	
October 4	Temple	Fitton Field; Worcester, MA	W 19–13	16,000	
October 11	Villanova	Fitton Field; Worcester, MA	L 6–13	20,047	
October 18	at Harvard	Harvard Stadium; Boston, MA	L 0–7	28,000	
October 25	at Syracuse	Archbold Stadium; Syracuse, NY	W 26–0	20,000	
November 1	at Brown	Brown Stadium; Providence, RI	L 19–20	18,000	
November 8	Colgate	Fitton Field; Worcester, MA	T 6–6	10,000	
November 15	at Columbia	Baker Field; New York, NY	L 0–10	28,000	
November 22	Fordham	Fitton Field; Worcester, MA (rivalry)	W 48–0	7,000	
November 29	at Boston College	Braves Field; Boston, MA (rivalry)	W 20–6	42,500	
