= 1947 Penn State Nittany Lions football team =

American college football season

1947 Penn State Nittany Lions football
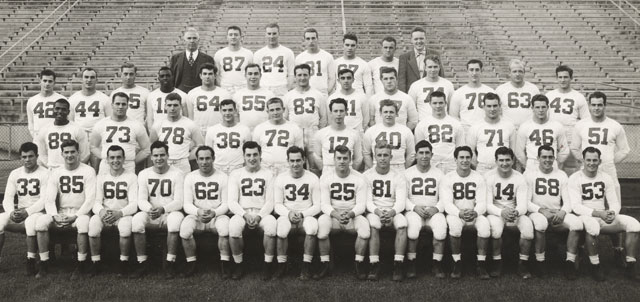

Eastern champion

Cotton Bowl Classic, T 13–13 vs. SMU
- Conference: Independent

Ranking
- AP: No. 4
- Record: 9–0–1
- Head coach: Bob Higgins (18th season)
- Captains: John Nolan; John Potsklan
- Home stadium: New Beaver Field

1947 Eastern major college football independents records
	Conf.			Overall
Team	W	L	T	W		L		T
No. 4 Penn State		–		9	–	0	–	1
No. 11 Army		–		5	–	2	–	2
Villanova		–		6	–	3	–	1
Boston University		–		5	–	3	–	0
Boston College		–		5	–	4	–	0
Holy Cross		–		4	–	4	–	2
Syracuse		–		3	–	6	–	0
Temple		–		3	–	6	–	0
NYU		–		2	–	5	–	1
Colgate		–		1	–	5	–	2
Duquesne		–		2	–	8	–	0
Fordham		–		1	–	6	–	1
Merchant Marine		–		2	–	9	–	0
Pittsburgh		–		1	–	8	–	0
Rankings from AP Poll

The 1947 Penn State Nittany Lions football team was an American football team that represented Pennsylvania State University (Penn State) as an independent during the 1947 college football season. In its 18th season under head coach Bob Higgins, the team compiled an undefeated 9–0–1 record, shut out six opponents, outscored opponents by a total of 332 to 40, and was ranked No. 4 in the final AP Poll. The team was 9–0 during the regular season and played No. 3 SMU to a tie in the 1948 Cotton Bowl Classic. The team played its home games in New Beaver Field in State College, Pennsylvania.

On defense, the team gave up an average of 4.0 points per game, the lowest total among all major college teams during the 1947 season.

== Schedule ==
Date	Opponent	Rank	Site	Result	Attendance	Source
September 20	vs. Washington State		Hersheypark Stadium; Hershey, PA	W 27–6	15,000–16,000	
October 4	Bucknell		New Beaver Field; State College, PA	W 54–0	12,294	
October 11	at Fordham	No. 12	Polo Grounds; New York, NY	W 75–0	12,000	
October 18	Syracuse^{†}	No. 9	New Beaver Field; State College, PA (rivalry)	W 40–0	16,632–20,000	
October 25	West Virginia	No. 9	New Beaver Field; State College, PA (rivalry)	W 21–14	20,313–22,000	
November 1	Colgate	No. 7	New Beaver Field; State College, PA	W 46–0	14,014	
November 8	at Temple	No. 7	Temple Stadium; Philadelphia, PA	W 7–0	20,000	
November 15	vs. Navy	No. 8	Municipal Stadium; Baltimore, MD	W 20–7	25,000	
November 22	at Pittsburgh	No. 5	Pitt Stadium; Pittsburgh, PA (rivalry)	W 29–0	47,822–53,000	
January 1, 1948	vs. No. 3 SMU	No. 4	Cotton Bowl; Dallas, TX (Cotton Bowl)	T 13–13	43,000–47,000	
^{†}Homecoming; Rankings from AP Poll released prior to the game

== Rankings ==
Ranking movements Legend: ██ Increase in ranking ██ Decrease in ranking ( ) = First-place votes
	Week									
Poll	1	2	3	4	5	6	7	8	9	Final
AP	12 (1)	9	9 (1)	7 (2)	7 (2)	8 (3)	5 (6)	5 (1)	5	4 (1)
