= 1947 Syracuse Orangemen football team =

American college football season

1947 Syracuse Orangemen football
- Conference: Independent
- Record: 3–6
- Head coach: Reaves Baysinger (1st season)
- Captain: Laurence Ellis
- Home stadium: Archbold Stadium

1947 Eastern major college football independents records
	Conf.			Overall
Team	W	L	T	W		L		T
No. 4 Penn State		–		9	–	0	–	1
No. 11 Army		–		5	–	2	–	2
Villanova		–		6	–	3	–	1
Boston University		–		5	–	3	–	0
Boston College		–		5	–	4	–	0
Holy Cross		–		4	–	4	–	2
Syracuse		–		3	–	6	–	0
Temple		–		3	–	6	–	0
NYU		–		2	–	5	–	1
Colgate		–		1	–	5	–	2
Duquesne		–		2	–	8	–	0
Fordham		–		1	–	6	–	1
Merchant Marine		–		2	–	9	–	0
Pittsburgh		–		1	–	8	–	0
Rankings from AP Poll

The 1947 Syracuse Orangemen football team was an American football team that represented Syracuse University as an independent during the 1947 college football season. In its first season under head coach Reaves Baysinger, the team compiled a 3–6 record and was outscored by at total of 167 to 77. Laurence Ellis was the team captain.

In the final Litkenhous Ratings released in mid-December, Syracuse was ranked at No. 123 out of 500 college football teams.

The team played its home games at Archbold Stadium in Syracuse, New York.

== Schedule ==
Date	Opponent	Site	Result	Attendance	Source
September 26	Niagara	Archbold Stadium; Syracuse, NY	W 14–7	25,000	
October 4	Dartmouth	Archbold Stadium; Syracuse, NY	L 7–28	18,000	
October 11	Temple	Archbold Stadium; Syracuse, NY	W 28–12	20,000	
October 18	at No. 9 Penn State	New Beaver Field; University Park, PA (rivalry)	L 0–40	20,000	
October 25	Holy Cross	Archbold Stadium; Syracuse, NY	L 0–26	20,000	
November 1	at Lafayette	Fisher Field; Easton, PA	L 7–14	10,000	
November 8	at Cornell	Schoellkopf Field; Ithaca, NY	L 6–12	27,000	
November 15	Colgate	Archbold Stadium; Syracuse, NY (rivalry)	W 7–0	36,000	
November 22	at No. 19 Columbia	Baker Field; New York, NY	L 8–28	22,000	
Rankings from AP Poll released prior to the game
