= 1947 Boston College Eagles football team =

American college football season

1947 Boston College Eagles football
- Conference: Independent
- Record: 5–4
- Head coach: Denny Myers (4th season)
- Captain: Angie Nicketakis
- Home stadium: Braves Field

1947 Eastern major college football independents records
	Conf.			Overall
Team	W	L	T	W		L		T
No. 4 Penn State		–		9	–	0	–	1
No. 11 Army		–		5	–	2	–	2
Villanova		–		6	–	3	–	1
Boston University		–		5	–	3	–	0
Boston College		–		5	–	4	–	0
Holy Cross		–		4	–	4	–	2
Syracuse		–		3	–	6	–	0
Temple		–		3	–	6	–	0
NYU		–		2	–	5	–	1
Colgate		–		1	–	5	–	2
Duquesne		–		2	–	8	–	0
Fordham		–		1	–	6	–	1
Merchant Marine		–		2	–	9	–	0
Pittsburgh		–		1	–	8	–	0
Rankings from AP Poll

The 1947 Boston College Eagles football team was an American football team that represented Boston College as an independent during the 1947 college football season. In its fourth season under head coach Denny Myers, the team compiled a 5–4 record and outscored opponents by a total of 184 to 134.

Boston College was ranked at No. 54 (out of 500 college football teams) in the final Litkenhous Ratings for 1947.

The team played its home games at Braves Field in Boston.

== Schedule ==
Date	Opponent	Site	Result	Attendance	Source
September 26	Clemson	Braves Field; Boston, MA (rivalry)	W 32–22	30,000	
October 10	Kansas State	Braves Field; Boston, MA	W 49–13	21,457	
October 17	LSU	Braves Field; Boston, MA	L 13–14	36,423	
October 24	Villanova	Braves Field; Boston, MA	W 6–0	40,184	
November 1	Georgetown	Braves Field; Boston, MA	W 27–6	21,009	
November 8	Wake Forest	Braves Field; Boston, MA	L 13–14	30,279	
November 15	at Tennessee	Shields–Watkins Field; Knoxville, TN	L 13–38	20,000	
November 22	Saint Mary's	Braves Field; Boston, MA	W 25–7	19,733	
November 29	Holy Cross	Braves Field; Boston, MA (rivalry)	L 6–20	42,500	
