= 1947 Penn Quakers football team =

American college football season

1947 Penn Quakers football
- Conference: Independent

Ranking
- AP: No. 7
- Record: 7–0–1
- Head coach: George Munger (10th season)
- Offensive scheme: Single-wing
- Captains: Jerry McCarthy; Bill Luongo
- Home stadium: Franklin Field

1947 Ivy Group football standings
	Conf.					Overall
Team	W		L		T	W		L		T
No. 7 Penn	4	–	0	–	0	7	–	0	–	1
Princeton	4	–	2	–	0	5	–	3	–	0
Yale	3	–	2	–	0	6	–	3	–	0
No. 20 Columbia	2	–	2	–	0	7	–	2	–	0
Harvard	1	–	3	–	0	4	–	5	–	0
Brown	1	–	3	–	0	4	–	4	–	1
Dartmouth	3	–	4	–	0	4	–	4	–	1
Cornell	1	–	4	–	0	4	–	5	–	0
Rankings from AP Poll

The 1947 Penn Quakers football team was an American football team that represented the University of Pennsylvania during the 1947 college football season.

In its tenth season under head coach George Munger, the team compiled a 7–0–1 record, outscored opponents by a total of 219 to 35, and was ranked No. 7 in the final AP Poll. The team's lone setback was a 7–7 tie with Army.

Munger was Penn's head coach for 16 years; he was inducted into the College Football Hall of Fame in 1976. In addition, three players from the 1947 team were inducted into the College Football Hall of Fame: center/linebacker Chuck Bednarik; tackle George Savitsky; and halfback Skip Minisi. Bednarik was a consensus first-team All-American; he also finished seventh in the 1947 voting for the Heisman Trophy.

== Schedule ==
Date	Opponent	Rank	Site	Result	Attendance	Source
October 4	Lafayette		Franklin Field; Philadelphia, PA	W 59–0	51,283	
October 11	at Dartmouth	No. 7	Memorial Field; Hanover, NH	W 32–0	12,000	
October 18	Columbia	No. 8	Franklin Field; Philadelphia, PA	W 34–14	70,000	
October 25	Navy	No. 8	Franklin Field; Philadelphia, PA	W 21–0	80,000	
November 1	at Princeton	No. 4	Palmer Stadium; Princeton, NJ (rivalry)	W 26–7	49,000	
November 8	No. 10 Virginia	No. 4	Franklin Field; Philadelphia, PA	W 19–7	79,000	
November 15	No. 13 Army	No. 3	Franklin Field; Philadelphia, PA	T 7–7	80,000	
November 27	Cornell	No. 8	Franklin Field; Philadelphia, PA (rivalry)	W 21–0	80,000	
Rankings from AP Poll released prior to the game

== Rankings ==
Ranking movements Legend: ██ Increase in ranking ██ Decrease in ranking ( ) = First-place votes
	Week									
Poll	1	2	3	4	5	6	7	8	9	Final
AP	7	8	8	4 (11)	4 (8)	3 (7)	6	8	8	7
