= 1947 Temple Owls football team =

American college football season

1947 Temple Owls football
- Conference: Independent
- Record: 3–6
- Head coach: Ray Morrison (8th season)
- Home stadium: Temple Stadium

1947 Eastern major college football independents records
	Conf.			Overall
Team	W	L	T	W		L		T
No. 4 Penn State		–		9	–	0	–	1
No. 11 Army		–		5	–	2	–	2
Villanova		–		6	–	3	–	1
Boston University		–		5	–	3	–	0
Boston College		–		5	–	4	–	0
Holy Cross		–		4	–	4	–	2
Syracuse		–		3	–	6	–	0
Temple		–		3	–	6	–	0
NYU		–		2	–	5	–	1
Colgate		–		1	–	5	–	2
Duquesne		–		2	–	8	–	0
Fordham		–		1	–	6	–	1
Merchant Marine		–		2	–	9	–	0
Pittsburgh		–		1	–	8	–	0
Rankings from AP Poll

The 1947 Temple Owls football team was an American football team that represented Temple University during the 1947 college football season. In its second season under head coach William Leckonby, the team compiled a 3–6 record and was outscored by a total of 128 to 91.

Temple was ranked at No. 100 (out of 500 college football teams) in the final Litkenhous Ratings for 1947.

The team played its home games at Temple Stadium in Philadelphia.

== Schedule ==
Date	Opponent	Site	Result	Attendance	Source
September 26	NYU	Temple Stadium; Philadelphia, PA	W 32–7	18,000	
October 4	at Holy Cross	Fitton Field; Worcester, MA	L 13–19	16,000	
October 11	at Syracuse	Archbold Stadium; Syracuse, NY	L 12–28	20,000	
October 17	Muhlenberg	Temple Stadium; Philadelphia, PA	W 7–6	27,000	
October 25	at Bucknell	Memorial Stadium; Lewisburg, PA	W 21–0	10,000	
November 1	Oklahoma A&M	Temple Stadium; Philadelphia, PA	L 0–26	12,000	
November 8	No. 7 Penn State^{†}	Temple Stadium; Philadelphia, PA	L 0–7	20,000	
November 15	Michigan State	Temple Stadium; Philadelphia, PA	L 6–14	7,500	
November 22	at West Virginia	Mountaineer Field; Morgantown, WV	L 0–21	10,000	
^{†}Homecoming; Rankings from AP Poll released prior to the game
