= 1947 Yale Bulldogs football team =

American college football season

1947 Yale Bulldogs football
- Conference: Independent
- Record: 6–3
- Head coach: Howie Odell (6th season)
- Captain: Endicott P. Davison
- Home stadium: Yale Bowl

1947 Ivy Group football standings
	Conf.					Overall
Team	W		L		T	W		L		T
No. 7 Penn	4	–	0	–	0	7	–	0	–	1
Princeton	4	–	2	–	0	5	–	3	–	0
Yale	3	–	2	–	0	6	–	3	–	0
No. 20 Columbia	2	–	2	–	0	7	–	2	–	0
Harvard	1	–	3	–	0	4	–	5	–	0
Brown	1	–	3	–	0	4	–	4	–	1
Dartmouth	3	–	4	–	0	4	–	4	–	1
Cornell	1	–	4	–	0	4	–	5	–	0
Rankings from AP Poll

The 1947 Yale Bulldogs football team represented Yale University in the 1947 college football season. Bulldogs were led by sixth-year head coach Howie Odell, played their home games at the Yale Bowl and finished the season with a 6–3 record.

Yale was ranked at No. 53 (out of 500 college football teams) in the final Litkenhous Ratings for 1947.

== Schedule ==
Date	Opponent	Rank	Site	Result	Attendance	Source
September 27	Merchant Marine		Yale Bowl; New Haven, CT	W 34–13	18,000	
October 4	Cornell		Yale Bowl; New Haven, CT	W 14–0	50,000	
October 11	at No. 11 Columbia	No. 14	Baker Field; New York, NY	W 17–7	35,000	
October 18	Wisconsin	No. 12	Yale Bowl; New Haven, CT	L 0–9	65,000	
October 25	Springfield		Yale Bowl; New Haven, CT	W 49–0	15,000	
November 1	Dartmouth		Yale Bowl; New Haven, CT	W 23–14	63,000	
November 8	Brown	No. 20	Yale Bowl; New Haven, CT	L 14–20	15,000	
November 15	at Princeton		Palmer Stadium; Princeton, NJ (rivalry)	L 0–17	50,000	
November 22	Harvard		Yale Bowl; New Haven, CT (rivalry)	W 31–21	70,896	
Rankings from AP Poll released prior to the game

== Rankings ==
Ranking movements Legend: ██ Increase in ranking ██ Decrease in ranking — = Not ranked
	Week									
Poll	1	2	3	4	5	6	7	8	9	Final
AP	14	12	—	—	20	—	—	—	—	—

== After the season ==
The following Bulldog was selected in the National Football League draft following the season.

Round	Pick	Player	Position	NFL club
8	59	Robert (Tex) Furse	B	Boston Yanks
24	219	Jack Roderick	E	Boston Yanks
