= 1947 West Virginia Mountaineers football team =

American college football season

1947 West Virginia Mountaineers football
- Conference: Independent
- Record: 6–4
- Head coach: Bill Kern (5th season)
- Captain: Gene Corum
- Home stadium: Mountaineer Field

1947 Southern major college football independents records
	Conf.			Overall
Team	W	L	T	W		L		T
Virginia		–		7	–	3	–	0
West Virginia		–		6	–	4	–	0
Georgetown		–		3	–	4	–	1
Chattanooga		–		4	–	6	–	0
Miami (FL)		–		2	–	7	–	0
Navy		–		1	–	7	–	1

The 1947 West Virginia Mountaineers football team was an American football team that represented West Virginia University as an independent during the 1947 college football season. In its fifth season under head coach Bill Kern, the team compiled a 6–4 record and outscored opponents by a total of 252 to 84. The team played home games at Mountaineer Field in Morgantown, West Virginia. Eugene Corum was the team captain.

West Virginia was ranked at No. 42 (out of 500 college football teams) in the final Litkenhous Ratings for 1947.

== Schedule ==
Date	Opponent	Site	Result	Attendance	Source
September 27	Otterbein	Mountaineer Field; Morgantown, WV	W 59–0	15,000	
October 4	vs. Washington and Lee	Laidley Field; Charleston, WV	W 35–6	11,000	
October 11	Waynesburg	Mountaineer Field; Morgantown, WV	W 60–7	8,000	
October 18	at NYU	Yankee Stadium; Bronx, NY	W 40–0	8,000	
October 25	at No. 9 Penn State	Beaver Field; State College, PA (rivalry)	L 14–21	22,000	
November 1	at Maryland	Byrd Stadium; College Park, MD (rivalry)	L 0–27	16,500	
November 8	Kentucky	Mountaineer Field; Morgantown, WV	L 6–15	26,500	
November 15	No. 15 Virginia	Mountaineer Field; Morgantown, WV	L 0–6	18,000	
November 22	Temple	Mountaineer Field; Morgantown, WV	W 21–0	10,000	
November 29	at Pittsburgh	Pitt Stadium; Pittsburgh, PA (rivalry)	W 17–2	15,000	
Rankings from AP Poll released prior to the game
