= 1947 Villanova Wildcats football team =

American college football season

1947 Villanova Wildcats football

Great Lakes Bowl, L 14–24 vs. Kentucky
- Conference: Independent
- Record: 6–3–1
- Head coach: Jordan Olivar (5th season)
- Captain: Alfred Barker
- Home stadium: Shibe Park, Villanova Stadium

1947 Eastern major college football independents records
	Conf.			Overall
Team	W	L	T	W		L		T
No. 4 Penn State		–		9	–	0	–	1
No. 11 Army		–		5	–	2	–	2
Villanova		–		6	–	3	–	1
Boston University		–		5	–	3	–	0
Boston College		–		5	–	4	–	0
Holy Cross		–		4	–	4	–	2
Syracuse		–		3	–	6	–	0
Temple		–		3	–	6	–	0
NYU		–		2	–	5	–	1
Colgate		–		1	–	5	–	2
Duquesne		–		2	–	8	–	0
Fordham		–		1	–	6	–	1
Merchant Marine		–		2	–	9	–	0
Pittsburgh		–		1	–	8	–	0
Rankings from AP Poll

The 1947 Villanova Wildcats football team was an American football team that represented Villanova University as an independent during the 1947 college football season. In its fifth season under head coach Jordan Olivar, the team compiled a 6–3–1 record and lost to Kentucky in the 1947 Great Lakes Bowl.

Villanova was ranked at No. 47 (out of 500 college football teams) in the final Litkenhous Ratings for 1947.

The team played three of its home games at Shibe Park in Philadelphia and one game at Villanova Stadium in Villanova, Pennsylvania.

== Schedule ==
Date	Opponent	Site	Result	Attendance	Source
September 20	Merchant Marine	Villanova Stadium; Villanova, PA	W 60–0	10,000	
September 27	at Army	Michie Stadium; West Point, NY	L 0–13	28,000	
October 3	Miami (FL)	Shibe Park; Philadelphia, PA	T 7–7	26,500	
October 11	at Holy Cross	Fitton Field; Worcester, MA	W 13–6	20,047	
October 18	Detroit	Shibe Park; Philadelphia, PA	W 14–12	15,572	
October 24	at Boston College	Braves Field; Boston, MA	L 0–6	40,184	
November 8	at Marquette	Marquette Stadium; Milwaukee, WI	W 25–7	12,000	
November 15	Georgetown	Shibe Park; Philadelphia, PA	W 14–12	15,000	
November 23	at San Francisco	Kezar Stadium; San Francisco, CA	W 21–19	20,000	
December 6	vs. Kentucky	Cleveland Stadium; Cleveland, OH (Great Lakes Bowl)	L 14–24	15,000	

== Roster ==
Jordan Olivar, head coach
Al Barker
Ed Berrang, drafted in the fifth round of the 1949 NFL draft
Dan Brown
Romeo Capriotti, Frankford High football star
Jim Caulfield
Tom Clavin
Cullen
Bill Doherty
Andy Gordon
Don Griffith
Kane
Komarnicki
Lilenthal
Ralph Pasquariello, drafted in the first round of the 1950 NFL draft
Bob Polidor, a graduate of Benjamin Franklin High
Steve Romanik
Sandusky
Al Schmid
John Siano, baseball and football standout from Curtis High on Staten Island
T. Smith
Billy Wolff
