= 1947 Cornell Big Red football team =

American college football season

1947 Cornell Big Red football
- Conference: Independent
- Record: 4–5
- Head coach: George K. James (1st season)
- Captain: Walt Kretz
- Home stadium: Schoellkopf Field

1947 Ivy Group football standings
	Conf.					Overall
Team	W		L		T	W		L		T
No. 7 Penn	4	–	0	–	0	7	–	0	–	1
Princeton	4	–	2	–	0	5	–	3	–	0
Yale	3	–	2	–	0	6	–	3	–	0
No. 20 Columbia	2	–	2	–	0	7	–	2	–	0
Harvard	1	–	3	–	0	4	–	5	–	0
Brown	1	–	3	–	0	4	–	4	–	1
Dartmouth	3	–	4	–	0	4	–	4	–	1
Cornell	1	–	4	–	0	4	–	5	–	0
Rankings from AP Poll

The 1947 Cornell Big Red football team was an American football team that represented Cornell University during the 1947 college football season. In its first season under head coach George K. James, the team compiled a 4–5 record and was outscored by a total of 161 to 126.

Cornell was ranked at No. 75 (out of 500 college football teams) in the final Litkenhous Ratings for 1947.

== Schedule ==
Date	Opponent	Site	Result	Attendance	Source
September 27	Lehigh	Schoellkopf Field; Ithaca, NY	W 27–0	12,000	
October 4	at Yale	Yale Bowl; New Haven, CT	L 0–14	50,000	
October 11	at Colgate	Colgate Athletic Field; Hamilton, NY (rivalry)	W 27–18	16,000	
October 18	Navy	Schoellkopf Field; Ithaca, NY	L 19–38	35,500	
October 25	at Princeton	Palmer Stadium; Princeton, NJ	W 28–21	34,000	
November 1	No. 20 Columbia	Schoellkopf Field; Ithaca, NY (rivalry)	L 0–22	25,000	
November 8	Syracuse	Schoellkopf Field; Ithaca, NY	W 12–6	27,000	
November 15	at Dartmouth	Memorial Field; Hanover, NH (rivalry)	L 13–21	13,000	
November 27	at No. 8 Penn	Franklin Field; Philadelphia, PA (rivalry)	L 0–21	80,000	
Rankings from AP Poll released prior to the game
