= 1947 Boston University Terriers football team =

American college football season

1947 Boston University Terriers football
- Conference: Independent

Ranking
- AP: No. 16
- Record: 5–3
- Head coach: Aldo Donelli (1st season)
- Home stadium: Fenway Park

1947 Eastern major college football independents records
	Conf.			Overall
Team	W	L	T	W		L		T
No. 4 Penn State		–		9	–	0	–	1
No. 11 Army		–		5	–	2	–	2
Villanova		–		6	–	3	–	1
Boston University		–		5	–	3	–	0
Boston College		–		5	–	4	–	0
Holy Cross		–		4	–	4	–	2
Syracuse		–		3	–	6	–	0
Temple		–		3	–	6	–	0
NYU		–		2	–	5	–	1
Colgate		–		1	–	5	–	2
Duquesne		–		2	–	8	–	0
Fordham		–		1	–	6	–	1
Merchant Marine		–		2	–	9	–	0
Pittsburgh		–		1	–	8	–	0
Rankings from AP Poll

The 1947 Boston University Terriers football team was an American football team that represented Boston University as an independent during the 1947 college football season. In its first season under head coach Aldo Donelli, the team compiled a 5–3 record and outscored opponents by a total of 196 to 168.

Donelli was hired as Boston University's football coach shortly after the close of the 1946 season. He had previously been a head coach in the National Football League for the Pittsburgh Steelers and Cleveland Rams. His hiring was described by the United Press as "a giant step forward" in Boston University's "march into 'bigtime' football". Donelli remained the head coach at Boston University for 10 years.

== Schedule ==
Date	Opponent	Site	Result	Attendance	Source
September 27	Mohawk	Fenway Park; Boston, MA	W 45–7	5,000	
October 4	at Harvard	Harvard Stadium; Boston, MA	L 14–19	30,000	
October 11	NYU	Fenway Park; Boston, MA	W 38–7	7,000	
October 18	Purdue^{†}	Fenway Park; Boston, MA	L 7–62	11,446	
October 25	William & Mary	Fenway Park; Boston, MA	L 13–47	6,800	
November 1	Fordham	Fenway Park; Boston, MA	W 26–6	2,703	
November 15	Merchant Marine	Fenway Park; Boston, MA	W 33–6	1,987	
November 29	Colgate	Fenway Park; Boston, MA	W 20–14	9,877	
^{†}Homecoming
