= 1947 college football rankings =

- Season: 1947
- Bowl season: 1947–48 bowl games

One human poll comprised the 1947 college football rankings. Unlike most sports, college football's governing body, the NCAA, did not bestow a national championship, instead that title was bestowed by various agencies.

There was one weekly poll that began in the preseason—the Associated Press Poll. The AP Poll did not begin conducting preseason polls until 1950. The United Press Coaches' Poll began operation that same year.

== Legend ==
	Increase in ranking
	Decrease in ranking
	Not ranked previous week
	National champion
(#–#)	Win–loss record
(Italics)	Number of first place votes
т	Tied with team above or below also with this symbol

== AP Poll ==
The final regular season AP Poll was released on December 8, at the end of the 1947 regular season, weeks before the major bowls. The AP did not release a post-bowl season final poll regularly until 1968.

	Week 1 Oct 6	Week 2 Oct 13	Week 3 Oct 20	Week 4 Oct 27	Week 5 Nov 3	Week 6 Nov 10	Week 7 Nov 17	Week 8 Nov 24	Week 9 Dec 1	Week 10 (Final) Dec 8	
1.	Notre Dame (1–0) (52)	Michigan (3–0) (93)	Michigan (4–0) (147)	Notre Dame (4–0) (78)	Notre Dame (5–0) (106)	Notre Dame (6–0) (117)	Michigan (8–0) (140)	Notre Dame (8–0) (97)	Notre Dame (8–0) (58.5)	Notre Dame (9–0) (107)	1.
2.	Michigan (2–0) (29)	Notre Dame (2–0) (23)	Notre Dame (3–0) (21)	Michigan (5–0) (69)	Michigan (6–0) (56)	Michigan (7–0) (34)	Notre Dame (7–0) (87)	Michigan (9–0) (81)	Michigan (9–0) (54.5)	Michigan (9–0) (25)	2.
3.	Texas (3–0) (15)	Texas (4–0) (10)	Texas (5–0) (10)	Texas (6–0) (25)	SMU (6–0) (7)	Penn (6–0) (7)	SMU (8–0) (9)	SMU (9–0) (6)	USC (7–0–1) (2)	SMU (9–0–1)	3.
4.	Georgia Tech (2–0) (3)	California (4–0)	California (5–0) (1)	Penn (4–0) (11)	Penn (5–0) (8)	SMU (7–0) (2)	USC (6–0–1) (3)	USC (7–0–1) (3)	SMU (9–0–1)	Penn State (9–0) (1)	4.
5.	Army (2–0) (1)	Georgia Tech (3–0) (1)	Illinois (3–0–1)	USC (4–0–1) (6)	USC (5–0–1) (2)	USC (6–0–1) (5)	Penn State (8–0) (6)	Penn State (9–0) (1)	Penn State (9–0)	Texas (9–1)	5.
6.	Illinois (2–0)	Illinois (2–0–1) (1)	Army (3–0–1) (2)	Georgia Tech (5–0) (2)	Georgia Tech (6–0) (6)	Georgia Tech (7–0) (1)	Penn (6–0–1)	Alabama (7–2)	Texas (9–1) (2)	Alabama (8–2) (1)	6.
7.	Penn (1–0)	Army (2–0–1)	Georgia Tech (4–0) (2)	Penn State (5–0) (2)	Penn State (6–0) (2)	Texas (7–1)	Texas (8–1)	Texas (8–1)	Alabama (8–2)	Penn (7–0–1)	7.
8.	California (3–0) (1)	Penn (2–0)	Penn (3–0)	SMU (5–0)	Texas (6–1)	Penn State (7–0) (3)	Alabama (6–2)	Penn (6–0–1)	Penn (7–0–1)	USC (7–1–1)	8.
9.	Georgia (2–1)	Penn State (3–0)	Penn State (4–0) (1)	Duke (4–0–1) (2)	Army (4–1–1)	Wisconsin (5–1–1)	California (8–1)	Georgia Tech (8–1)	Georgia Tech (9–1)	North Carolina (8–2) (7)	9.
10.	Vanderbilt (2–0)	Vanderbilt (3–0)	USC (3–0–1)	Army (3–1–1)	Virginia (6–0)	California (7–1)	Georgia Tech (7–1)	North Carolina (7–2) (3)	North Carolina (8–2) (9)	Georgia Tech (9–1)	10.
11.	Columbia (2–0)	USC (2–0–1)	Wake Forest (4–0)	Illinois (3–1–1)	Illinois (3–2–1)	Illinois (4–2–1)	Army (4–2–2)	California (9–1)	Army (5–2–2)	Army (5–2–2)	11.
12.	Penn State (2–0) (1)	Yale (3–0)	SMU (4–0)	Virginia (5–0)	California (6–1)	William & Mary (6–1)	Illinois (5–2–1)	Army (4–2–2)	Ole Miss (8–2)	Kansas (8–0–2)	12.
13.	Duke (2–0)	Minnesota (3–0) (1)	Virginia (4–0)	Kentucky (5–1)	Duke (4–1–1)	Army (4–2–1)	North Carolina (6–2) (1)	Kansas (7–0–2)	Kansas (8–0–2) т	Ole Miss (8–2)	13.
14.	Yale (2–0)	Wake Forest (3–0) (2)	Kentucky (4–1)	California (5–1)	Purdue (4–2)	Alabama (5–2)	William & Mary (7–1)	William & Mary (8–1)	William & Mary (9–1) (3) т	William & Mary (9–1)	14.
15.	Oklahoma (2–0)	Rice (1–1–1)	Duke (3–0–1)	Wake Forest (4–1)	William & Mary (5–1)	Ole Miss (6–2) т	Ole Miss(7–2)	Ole Miss (7–2)	California (9–1)	California (9–1)	15.
16.	Rice (1–1–1)	Virginia (3–0)	UCLA (3–1)	Purdue (3–2)	Alabama (4–2)	Virginia (6–1) т	Virginia (7–1)	Columbia (7–2) (1)	NC State (5–3–1)	Oklahoma (7–2–1) (1)	16.
17.	Minnesota (2–0) (1)	Duke (2–0–1)	Baylor (4–0)	LSU (4–1)	Columbia (4–2)	Missouri (6–2)	Kansas (6–0–2)	UCLA (5–4)	Rice (6–3–1)	NC State (5–3–1)	17.
18.	Ole Miss (3–0)	NC State (2–1)	LSU (3–1)	Alabama (4–2)	North Carolina (4–2)	Utah (7–0)	UCLA (5–3)	Rice (5–3–1)	Oklahoma (7–2–1)	Rice (6–3–1)	18.
19.	North Carolina (1–1)	UCLA (2–1)	Vanderbilt (3–1)	UCLA (3–2)	Wisconsin (4–1–1)	North Carolina (5–2)	Columbia (6–2)	Minnesota (6–3)	UCLA (5–4)	Duke (4–3–2)	19.
20.	USC (1–0–1)	Kentucky (3–1)	San Francisco (4–1)	Columbia (3–2)	Yale (5–1)	Minnesota (5–2)	Rice (4–3–1)	Oklahoma (6–2–1)	Catawba (9–1)	Columbia (7–2)	20.
	Week 1 Oct 6	Week 2 Oct 13	Week 3 Oct 20	Week 4 Oct 27	Week 5 Nov 3	Week 6 Nov 10	Week 7 Nov 17	Week 8 Nov 24	Week 9 Dec 1	Week 10 (Final) Dec 8	
		Dropped: Columbia; Georgia; Ole Miss; North Carolina; Oklahoma	Dropped: Minnesota; NC State; Rice; Yale	Dropped: Baylor; San Francisco; Vanderbilt	Dropped: Kentucky; LSU; UCLA; Wake Forest	Dropped: Columbia; Duke; Purdue; Yale	Dropped: Minnesota; Missouri; Utah; Wisconsin	Dropped: Illinois; Virginia	Dropped: Columbia; Minnesota	Dropped: Catawba; UCLA	

=== Post-bowl poll ===
The final regular season AP poll, taken in early December before the bowls, had Notre Dame No. 1 (107 first-place votes) and Michigan second, with 25 first-place votes. Michigan won the Rose Bowl 49–0 over USC while Notre Dame did not play in a bowl game. Detroit Free Press sports editor Lyall Smith arranged a special post-bowl poll with only Michigan or Notre Dame as choices, which favored Michigan 226–119. However, it was stated that "The new ballot does not supersede the Associated Press' regular final season rating of college football teams, released last December 8, which named Notre Dame the mythical National champion with Michigan the runner-up."

== Litkenhous Ratings ==
The final Litkenhous Ratings released in December 1947 provided numerical rankings to more than 500 college and military football programs. The top 150 ranked teams were:

1. Michigan (10–0) - 114.0
2. Notre Dame (9–0) - 109.4
3. Texas (10–1) - 103.6
4. USC (7–2–1) - 100.0
5. Penn (7–0–1) - 99.6
6. Army (5–2–2) - 98.2
7. Rice (6–3–1) - 98.1
8. Illinois (5–3–1) - 95.7
9. UCLA (5–4) - 95.0
10. SMU (9–0–2) - 93.9
11. California (9–1) - 93.4
12. Penn State (9–0–1) - 93.2
13. North Carolina (8–2) - 91.7
14. Minnesota (6–3) - 91.2
15. Ole Miss (9–2) - 91.1
16. Wisconsin (5–3–1) - 90.5
17. Indiana (5–3–1) - 89.0
18. Purdue (5–4) - 88.7
19. Georgia Tech (10–1) - 86.9
20. Alabama (8–3) - 86.7
21. Kansas (8–1–2) - 86.5
22. Northwestern (3–6) - 86.2
23. TCU (4–5–2) - 86.0
24. William & Mary (9–2) - 85.7
25. Iowa (3–5–1) - 85.3
26. Virginia (7–3) - 84.9
27. Arkansas (6–4–1) - 84.8
28. Missouri (6–4) - 84.5
29. Kentucky (8–3) - 84.4
30. Columbia (7–2) - 83.0
31. Vanderbilt (6–4) - 82.7
32. Navy (1–7–1) - 81.9
33. Washington (3–6) - 81.7
34. LSU (5–3–1) - 81.1
35. Ohio State (2–6–1) - 80.4
36. Oregon (7–3) - 80.2
37. San Francisco (7–3) - 80.2
38. Michigan State (7–2) - 80.1
39. Oklahoma (7–2–1) - 79.9
40. Georgia (7–4–1) - 79.5
41. Texas A&M (3–6–1) - 79.4
42. West Virginia (6–4) - 79.3
43. Baylor (5–5) -78.5
44. Mississippi State (7–3) - 78.0
45. Maryland (7–2–2) - 77.9
46. Tennessee (5–5) - 77.9
47. Villanova (6–3–1) - 77.9
48. Detroit (6–4) - 77.8
49. Princeton (5–3) - 77.1
50. NC State (5–3–1) - 77.0
51. Duke (4–3–2) - 76.6
52. Oregon State (5–5) - 76.6
53. Yale (6–3) - 75.3
54. Boston College (5–4) - 75.2
55. Nevada (9–2) - 75.2
56. Hardin–Simmons (8–3) - 74.8
57. Wake Forest (6–4) - 74.2
58. Rutgers (8–1) - 73.9
59. Tulane (2–5–2) - 73.2
60. Pacific (10–1) - 71.6
61. Holy Cross (4–4–2) - 71.5
62. Tulsa (5–5) - 71.4
63. Pepperdine (9–0) - 70.4
64. Washington State (3–7) - 70.4
65. Oklahoma A&M (3–7) - 70.3
66. Dartmouth (4–4–1) - 70.1
67. Marquette (4–5) - 70.1
68. Muhlenberg (9–1) - 70.1
69. Clemson (4–5) - 69.9
70. Stanford (0–9) - 69.4
71. Miami (OH) (9–0–1) - 68.9
72. South Carolina (6–2–1) - 68.8
73. Santa Clara (4–4) - 68.4
74. Florida (4–5–1) - 68.0
75. Cornell (4–5) - 67.7
76. Nebraska (2–7) - 67.7
77. Dayton (6–3) - 67.6
78. North Texas (10–2) - 67.5
79. Brown (4–4–1) - 67.3
80. Utah (8–1–1) - 66.9
81. Pittsburgh (1–8) - 66.4
82. San Jose State (9–3) - 66.4
83. Oklahoma City (7–3) - 66.2
84. Virginia Tech (4–5) - 66.1
85. Wichita (7–4) - 66.1
86. McNeese JC - 66.0
87. Miami (FL) (2–7–1) - 66.0
88. St. Bonaventure (6–3) - 64.8
89. Cincinnati (7–3) - 64.7
90. Iowa State (3–6) - 64.4
91. Georgetown (3–4–1) - 63.9
92. Arizona (5–4–1) - 63.7
93. Harvard (4–5) - 63.7
94. West Texas (7–4) - 63.6
95. Denver (5–4–1) - 63.1
96. Xavier (4–4–1) - 62.5
97. Marshall (9–3) - 62.2
98. V. M. I. - 62.1
99. Saint Louis (4–6) - 62.0
100. Temple (3–6) - 61.6
101. Saint Mary's (3–7) - 60.9
102. Utah State (6–5) - 60.8
103. Texas Mines (5–3–1) - 60.5
104. Washington and Lee (5–3) - 60.3
105. Canisius - 60.2
106. Youngstown (8–2) - 59.8
107. Toledo (9–2) - 59.5
108. East Texas (8–2) - 59.3
109. Colorado (4–5)- 56.7
116. Bowling Green (5–5) - 56.7
117. Catawba (11–1) - 56.6
118. Chattanooga (4–6) - 56.6
119. Idaho (4–4) - 56.6
120. Boston - 56.0
121. Davidson (6–3–1) - 55.8
122. Wayne (5–2) - 55.6
123. Syracuse (3–6) - 55.5
124. Lawrence - 55.4
125. New Hampshire (8–1) - 54.9
126. New Mexico (4–5–1) - 54.7
127. Buffalo (8–1) - 54.4
128. John Carroll - 54.3
129. Delaware (4–4) - 54.2
130. San Diego State (7–3–1) - 54.1
131. Abilene Christian - 53.8
132. BYU (3–7) - 53.7
133. Rollins - 53.4
134. George Washington (1–7–1) - 53.3
135. Wyoming (4–5) - 52.6
136. Missouri Valley (12–0) - 52.3
137. Western Michigan (5–4) - 52.0
138. Colorado A&M (5–4–1) - 51.8
139. Southwest Texas (5–4) - 51.7
140. Texas Tech (6–5) - 51.7
141. Hardin - 51.6
142. Denison - 51.5
143. Richmond (3–7) - 51.4
144. Loras - 50.7
145. Western Reserve (4–5) - 50.7
146. Louisville (7–0–1) - 50.6
147. Cameron State - 50.5
148. Drake (1–7–1) - 50.5
149. Kansas State (0–10) - 50.0
150. Compton - 49.8

== HBCU rankings ==
The Pittsburgh Courier, a leading African American newspaper, ranked the top 1947 teams from historically black colleges and universities using the Dickinson System in an era when college football was largely segregated. The rankings were published on December 6.

1. Tennessee A&I (10–0)
2. Wilberforce State (11–1)
3. Florida A&M (9–1)
4. Hampton (7–2–1)
5. Shaw (10–0)
6. Grambling (10–2)
7. Virginia State (8–1)
8. Southern (10–2)
9. Morgan State (5–2–1)
10. South Carolina State (7–1–2)
11. Howard (6–2–1)
12. Louisville Municipal (6–1–1)
13. Lincoln (MO) (3–3–1)
14. West Virginia State (7–2–1)
15. Fort Valley State (7–1–1)
16. Texas College (5–2–3)
17. Prairie View A&M (6–6)
18. Lane (6–5)
19. Lincoln (PA) (5–4–1)
20. Wiley (5–3–1)
21. Clark (4–3–1)
22. Kentucky State (4–6)

The Courier also ranked 7 what they called "smaller colleges" teams:

1. Alcorn A&M (10–1)
2. Bethune Cookman (10–2)
3. LeMoyne-Owen (4–1–1)
4. Florida Normal (5–2–1)
5. Allen (6–3)
6. Dillard (4–2–1)
7. Alabama A&M (3–1–1)

The Baltimore Afro-American also published post-season rankings on December 13:

1. Tennessee A&I (10–0)
2. Virginia State (8–1)
3. Wilberforce State (11–1)
4. Shaw (8–0)
5. Southern (10–2)
6. Florida A&M (9–1)
7. Howard (6–2–1)
8. Texas College (5–2–3)
9. Hampton (7–2–1)
10. South Carolina State (7–1–2)

== See also ==
- 1947 College Football All-America Team
