= 1947 Rutgers Queensmen football team =

American college football season

1947 Rutgers Queensmen football

Middle Three champion
- Conference: Middle Three Conference
- Record: 8–1 (2–0 Middle Three)
- Head coach: Harvey Harman (6th season)
- Home stadium: Rutgers Stadium

1947 Middle Three Conference football standings
| | Conf. | | | | | Overall |
| Team | W | | L | | T | W | | L | | T |
|---|---|---|---|---|---|---|---|---|---|---|
| Rutgers $ | 2 | – | 0 | – | 0 | 8 | – | 1 | – | 0 |
| Lafayette | 1 | – | 1 | – | 0 | 6 | – | 3 | – | 0 |
| Lehigh | 0 | – | 2 | – | 0 | 5 | – | 4 | – | 0 |
$ – Conference champion

The 1947 Rutgers Queensmen football team was an American football team that represented Rutgers University as a member of the Middle Three Conference in the 1947 college football season. In their sixth season under head coach Harvey Harman, the Queensmen compiled an 8–1 record, outscored their opponents 262 to 99, and won the Middle Three championship. The team lost its opening game against Columbia and then won eight consecutive games, including a 31–7 victory over Harvard.

Quarterback Frank R. Burns was selected by the Associated Press and International News Service as a first-team back on the 1947 All-Eastern football team.

Rutgers was ranked at No. 58 (out of 500 college football teams) in the final Litkenhous Ratings for 1947.

== Schedule ==
| Date | Opponent | Site | Result | Attendance | Source |
|---|---|---|---|---|---|
| September 27 | at Columbia* | Baker Field; New York, NY | L 28–40 | 23,000 | |
| October 4 | Western Reserve* | Rutgers Stadium; Piscataway, NJ | W 21–6 | 10,000 | |
| October 11 | Princeton* | Rutgers Stadium; Piscataway, NJ (rivalry) | W 13–7 | 30,426 | |
| October 18 | Fordham* | Rutgers Stadium; Piscataway, NJ | W 36–6 | 10,000 | |
| October 25 | Lehigh^{†} | Rutgers Stadium; Piscataway, NJ | W 46–13 | 12,000 | |
| November 1 | at Harvard* | Harvard Stadium; Boston, MA | W 31–7 | 15,000 | |
| November 8 | at Lafayette | Fisher Field; Easton, PA | W 20–0 | 11,000 | |
| November 15 | NYU* | Rutgers Stadium; Piscataway, NJ | W 40–0 | 14,000 | |
| November 27 | at Brown* | Brown Stadium; Providence, RI | W 27–20 | 16,000 | |
*Non-conference game; ^{†}Homecoming
