= 1947 Georgetown Hoyas football team =

American college football season

1947 Georgetown Hoyas football
- Conference: Independent
- Record: 3–4–1
- Head coach: Jack Hagerty (13th season)
- Captain: Game captains
- Home stadium: Griffith Stadium

1947 Southern major college football independents records
	Conf.			Overall
Team	W	L	T	W		L		T
Virginia		–		7	–	3	–	0
West Virginia		–		6	–	4	–	0
Georgetown		–		3	–	4	–	1
Chattanooga		–		4	–	6	–	0
Miami (FL)		–		2	–	7	–	0
Navy		–		1	–	7	–	1

The 1947 Georgetown Hoyas football team was an American football team that represented Georgetown University during the 1947 college football season. In its 13th season under head coach Jack Hagerty, the team compiled a 3–4–1 record and outscored opponents by a total of 95 to 70.

Georgetown was ranked at No. 91 (out of 500 college football teams) in the final Litkenhous Ratings for 1947.

The team played its home games at Griffith Stadium in Washington, D.C.

== Schedule ==
Date	Opponent	Site	Result	Attendance	Source
September 27	at Wake Forest	Groves Stadium; Wake Forest, NC	L 0–6	12,000	
October 3	Fordham	Griffith Stadium; Washington, DC	W 40–7	12,500	
October 10	Saint Louis	Griffith Stadium; Washington, DC	L 0–16	9,796	
October 18	at Tulsa	Skelly Stadium; Tulsa, OK	W 12–0	9,616	
October 24	NYU^{†}	Griffith Stadium; Washington, DC	W 25–0	9,564	
November 1	at Boston College	Braves Field; Boston, MA	L 6–27	21,009	
November 14	at Villanova	Shibe Park; Philadelphia, PA	L 12–14	15,000	
November 22	George Washington	Griffith Stadium; Washington, DC	T 0–0	11,000	
^{†}Homecoming
