= 1947 Harvard Crimson football team =

American college football season

1947 Harvard Crimson football
- Conference: Independent
- Record: 4–5
- Head coach: Dick Harlow (11th season)
- Home stadium: Harvard Stadium

1947 Ivy Group football standings
	Conf.					Overall
Team	W		L		T	W		L		T
No. 7 Penn	4	–	0	–	0	7	–	0	–	1
Princeton	4	–	2	–	0	5	–	3	–	0
Yale	3	–	2	–	0	6	–	3	–	0
No. 20 Columbia	2	–	2	–	0	7	–	2	–	0
Harvard	1	–	3	–	0	4	–	5	–	0
Brown	1	–	3	–	0	4	–	4	–	1
Dartmouth	3	–	4	–	0	4	–	4	–	1
Cornell	1	–	4	–	0	4	–	5	–	0
Rankings from AP Poll

The 1947 Harvard Crimson football team was an American football team that represented Harvard University during the 1947 college football season. In its 11th season under head coach Dick Harlow, the team compiled a 4–5 record and was outscored by a total of 177 to 139.

On October 11, 1947, at Charlottesville, Virginia, Harvard's Chester Middlebrook Pierce became the first African-American player to appear in a football game at a predominantly white university located south of the Potomac.

Harvard was ranked at No. 93 (out of 500 college football teams) in the final Litkenhous Ratings for 1947.

== Schedule ==
Date	Opponent	Site	Result	Attendance	Source
September 27	Western Maryland	Harvard Stadium; Boston, MA	W 52–0	17,000	
October 4	Boston University	Harvard Stadium; Boston, MA	W 19–14	30,000	
October 11	at Virginia	Scott Stadium; Charlottesville, VA	L 0–47	24,000	
October 18	Holy Cross	Harvard Stadium; Boston, MA	W 7–0	28,000	
October 25	Dartmouth	Harvard Stadium; Boston, MA	L 13–14	35,000	
November 1	Rutgers	Harvard Stadium; Boston, MA	L 7–31	15,000	
November 8	Princeton	Harvard Stadium; Boston, MA (rivalry)	L 7–33	25,000	
November 15	Brown	Harvard Stadium; Boston, MA	W 13–7	25,000	
November 22	at Yale	Yale Bowl; New Haven, CT (The Game)	L 21–31	70,896	
