= 1947 Army Cadets football team =

American college football season

1947 Army Cadets football
- Conference: Independent

Ranking
- AP: No. 11
- Record: 5–2–2
- Head coach: Earl Blaik (7th season)
- Captain: Joe Steffy
- Home stadium: Michie Stadium

1947 Eastern major college football independents records
	Conf.			Overall
Team	W	L	T	W		L		T
No. 4 Penn State		–		9	–	0	–	1
No. 11 Army		–		5	–	2	–	2
Villanova		–		6	–	3	–	1
Boston University		–		5	–	3	–	0
Boston College		–		5	–	4	–	0
Holy Cross		–		4	–	4	–	2
Syracuse		–		3	–	6	–	0
Temple		–		3	–	6	–	0
NYU		–		2	–	5	–	1
Colgate		–		1	–	5	–	2
Duquesne		–		2	–	8	–	0
Fordham		–		1	–	6	–	1
Merchant Marine		–		2	–	9	–	0
Pittsburgh		–		1	–	8	–	0
Rankings from AP Poll

The 1947 Army Cadets football team was an American football team that represented the United States Military Academy as an independent during the 1947 college football season. In its seventh year under head coach Earl Blaik, the team compiled a 5–2–2 record, was ranked No. 11 in the final AP poll, and outscored opponents by a total of 220 to 68. The team played its home games at Michie Stadium in West Point, New York.

Army's loss to Columbia on October 25, 1947, broke the Cadets' 32-game unbeaten streak dating back to November 1943.

Army guard Joe Steffy was selected by the Football Writers Association of America as the 1947 recipient of the Outland Trophy as the best guard or tackle in the country. Steffy was also a consensus first-team pick for the 1947 All-America team, and he was later inducted into the College Football Hall of Fame. Steffy and Army fullback Elwyn "Rip" Rowan received first-team honors on the International News Service's 1947 All-East team.

== Schedule ==
Date	Opponent	Rank	Site	Result	Attendance	Source
September 27	Villanova		Michie Stadium; West Point, NY	W 13–0	28,000	
October 4	Colorado		Michie Stadium; West Point, NY	W 47–0	21,000	
October 11	vs. No. 6 Illinois	No. 5	Yankee Stadium; Bronx, NY	T 0–0	65,000	
October 18	VPI	No. 7	Michie Stadium; West Point, NY	W 40–0	20,000	
October 25	at Columbia	No. 6	Baker Field; New York, NY	L 20–21	35,000	
November 1	Washington & Lee	No. 10	Michie Stadium; West Point, NY	W 65–13	21,050	
November 8	at No. 1 Notre Dame	No. 9	Notre Dame Stadium; Notre Dame, IN (rivalry)	L 7–27	59,171	
November 15	at No. 3 Penn	No. 13	Franklin Field; Philadelphia, PA	T 7–7	80,000	
November 29	vs. Navy	No. 12	Philadelphia Municipal Stadium; Philadelphia, PA (Army–Navy Game)	W 21–0	103,000	
Rankings from AP Poll released prior to the game

== Rankings ==
Ranking movements Legend: ██ Increase in ranking ██ Decrease in ranking ( ) = First-place votes
	Week									
Poll	1	2	3	4	5	6	7	8	9	Final
AP	5 (1)	7	6 (2)	10	9	13	11	12	11	11

== Roster ==
- Bill Gustafson - quarterback
- Elwyn "Rip" Rowan - fullback
- Winfield W. Scott Jr. - halfback
- Joe Steffy - guard
- Bill Yeoman - center
