= 1947 Big Nine Conference football season =

- Sport: Football
- Teams: 9
- Top draft pick: Jug Girard
- Champion: Michigan
- Runners-up: Wisconsin
- Season MVP: Bump Elliott

Football seasons
- 1946 1948

1947 Big Nine Conference football standings
	Conf.					Overall
Team	W		L		T	W		L		T
No. 2 Michigan $	6	–	0	–	0	10	–	0	–	0
Wisconsin	3	–	2	–	1	5	–	3	–	1
Minnesota	3	–	3	–	0	6	–	3	–	0
Illinois	3	–	3	–	0	5	–	3	–	1
Purdue	3	–	3	–	0	5	–	4	–	0
Indiana	2	–	3	–	1	5	–	3	–	1
Iowa	2	–	3	–	1	3	–	5	–	1
Northwestern	2	–	4	–	0	3	–	6	–	0
Ohio State	1	–	4	–	1	2	–	6	–	1
$ – Conference champion; Rankings from AP Poll

The 1947 Big Nine Conference football season was the 52nd season of college football played by the member schools of the Big Nine Conference (also known as the Western Conference and the Big Ten Conference) and was a part of the 1947 college football season.

The 1947 Big Ten champion was Michigan. The Wolverines compiled a perfect 10–0 record, outscored its opponents by a combined total of 394 to 53, and defeated the USC Trojans by a score of 49 to 0 in the 1948 Rose Bowl game.

Michigan halfback Bob Chappuis led the conference with 1,395 yards of total offense, which was also the fourth best in the country. Chappuis also finished second in the voting for the 1947 Heisman Trophy, trailing Johnny Lujack by a tally of 742 votes to 555 votes, with both finishing ahead of Doak Walker and Bobby Layne.

Wisconsin finished in second place in the conference, led by sophomore halfback Jug Girard. Girard, a triple-threat man who also returned two punts for touchdowns, was the first conference player selected in the 1948 NFL draft, being chosen by the Green Bay Packers with the seventh pick in the first round.

== Season overview ==
=== Results and team statistics ===
Conf. Rank	Team	Head coach	AP final	AP high	Overall record	Conf. record	PPG	PAG	MVP
1	Michigan	Fritz Crisler	2	1	10–0	6–0	39.4	5.3	Bump Elliott
2	Wisconsin	Harry Stuhldreher	NR	9	5–3–1	3–2–1	19.0	17.3	Red Wilson
3 (tie)	Minnesota	Bernie Bierman	NR	13	6–3	3–3	19.3	14.1	Larry Olsonoski
3 (tie)	Illinois	Ray Eliot	NR	NR	5–3–1	3–3	22.7	11.3	Ike Owens
3 (tie)	Purdue	Stuart Holcomb	NR	NR	5–4	3–3	22.8	14.4	Phil O'Reilly
6 (tie)	Indiana	Bo McMillin	NR	NR	5–3–1	2–3–1	17.3	11.3	Howard Brown
6 (tie)	Iowa	Eddie Anderson	NR	NR	3–5–1	2–3–1	16.1	19.9	Hal Schoener
8	Northwestern	Robert Voigts	NR	NR	3–6	2–4	14.3	21.8	Art Murakowski
9	Ohio State	Wes Fesler	NR	NR	2–6–1	1–4–1	6.7	16.7	Dave Templeton

Key
AP final = Team's rank in the final AP Poll of the 1947 season
AP high = Team's highest rank in the AP Poll throughout the 1947 season
PPG = Average of points scored per game
PAG = Average of points allowed per game MVP = Most valuable player as voted by players on each team as part of the voting process to determine the winner of the Chicago Tribune Silver Football trophy

=== Regular season ===
==== September 20 ====
On September 20, 1947, Iowa opened its season with a non-conference victory.

- Iowa 59, North Dakota State 0.

==== September 27 ====
On September 26 and 27, 1947, the Big Nine schools played one conference game and seven non-conference games. The non-conference games resulted in five wins and two losses, bringing the conference's record in non-conference games to 6-3.

- Michigan 55, Michigan State 0.
- Wisconsin 32, Purdue 14.
- Minnesota 7, Washington 6.
- Indiana 17, Nebraska 0.
- UCLA 22, Iowa 7 (played Friday, September 26).
- Illinois 14, Pittsburgh 0.
- Ohio State 13, Missouri 7.
- Vanderbilt 3, Northwestern 0.

==== October 4 ====
On October 4, 1948, the Big Nine schools played three conference games and three non-conference games. The non-conference games resulted in three wins, bringing the conference's record in non-conference games to 9-3.

- Michigan 49, Stanford 13.
- Wisconsin 7, Indiana 7.
- Minnesota 28, Nebraska 13.
- Illinois 35, Iowa 12.
- Purdue 24, Ohio State 20.
- Northwestern 27, UCLA 26 .

==== October 11 ====
On October 11, 1947, the Big Nine football teams played two conference games and five non-conference games. The non-conference games resulted in one win, three losses and one tie, bringing the conference's record in non-conference games to 10-6-1.

- Michigan 69, Pittsburgh 0.
- California 48, Wisconsin 7.
- Minnesota 37, Northwestern 21 (game played on Sunday, October 12).
- Illinois 0, Army 0.
- Notre Dame 22, Purdue 7.
- Iowa 27, Indiana 14.
- USC 32, Ohio State 0.

==== October 18 ====
On October 18, 1947, the Big Nine football teams played three conference games and three non-conference games. The non-conference games resulted in three wins, bringing the conference's record in non-conference games to 13-6-1.

- Michigan 49, Northwestern 21.
- Wisconsin 9, Yale 0.
- Illinois 40, Minnesota 13.
- Indiana 41, Pittsburgh 6.
- Iowa 13, Ohio State 13.
- Purdue 62, Boston University 7.

==== October 25 ====
On October 25, 1947, the Big Nine football teams played three conference games and three non-conference games. The non-conference games resulted in one win and two losses, bringing the conference's record in non-conference games to 14-8-1.

- Michigan 13, Minnesota 6.
- Wisconsin 35, Marquette 12.
- Northwestern 7, Indiana 6.
- Purdue 14, Illinois 7.
- Notre Dame 21, Iowa 0.
- Pittsburgh 12, Ohio State 0.

==== November 1 ====
On November 1, 1947, the Big Nine football teams played four conference games and one non-conference game. The non-conference game resulted in a win, bringing the conference's record in non-conference games to 15-8-1.

- Michigan 14, Illinois 7.
- Wisconsin 29, Northwestern 0.
- Minnesota 29, Pittsburgh 0.
- Indiana 7, Ohio State 0.
- Purdue 21, Iowa 0.

==== November 8 ====
On November 8, 1947, the Big Nine football teams played four conference games and one non-conference game. The non-conference game resulted in a win, bringing the conference's record in non-conference games to 16-8-1.

- Michigan 35, Indiana 0.
- Wisconsin 46, Iowa 14.
- Minnesota 26, Purdue 21.
- Illinois 60, Western Michigan 14.
- Ohio State 7, Northwestern 6.

==== November 15 ====
On November 15, 1947, the Big Nine football teams played three conference games and three non-conference games. The non-conference games resulted in two wins and a loss, bringing the conference's record in non-conference games to 18-9-1.

- Michigan 40, Wisconsin 6.
- Iowa 13, Minnesota 7.
- Indiana 48, Marquette 6.
- Illinois 28, Ohio State 7.
- Notre Dame 26, Northwestern 19.
- Purdue 28, Pittsburgh 0.

==== November 22 ====
On November 22, 1947, the Big Nine football teams played four conference games. Iowa, which opened the season early on September 20, had a bye week.

- Michigan 21, Ohio State 0.
- Minnesota 21, Wisconsin 0.
- Indiana 16, Purdue 14.
- Northwestern 28, Illinois 13.

=== Bowl games ===
On January 1, 1948, Michigan defeated USC, 49-0, in the 1948 Rose Bowl. The 49-point margin was the worst defeat in the history of the USC football program, and Michigan's 491 yards of total offense set a Rose Bowl record. The Wolverines threw four touchdown passes, and Jack Weisenburger ran for three touchdowns. Michigan completed 17 of 27 passes for 272 passing yards in the game.

== All-conference players ==
The following players were picked by the Associated Press (AP), the United Press (UP) and/or the International News Service (INS) as first-team players on the 1947 All-Big Ten Conference football team:

Position	Name	Team	Selectors
End	Bob Mann	Michigan	AP, INS, UP
End	Ike Owens	Illinois	AP, INS, UP
Tackle	Phil O'Reilly	Purdue	AP, INS, UP
Tackle	Lou Agase	Illinois	AP, INS
Tackle	Bill Pritula	Michigan	UP
Guard	Howard Brown	Indiana	AP, INS, UP
Guard	Leo Nomellini	Minnesota	AP, INS, UP
Center	Red Wilson	Wisconsin	AP, INS, UP
Quarterback	Howard Yerges	Michigan	AP, UP
Halfback	Bob Chappuis	Michigan	AP, INS, UP
Halfback	Bump Elliott	Michigan	AP, INS, UP
Halfback	Harry Szulborski	Purdue	INS
Fullback	Russ Steger	Illinois	AP, INS, UP

== All-Americans ==
Only two Big Ten players, both of them halfbacks for the Michigan squad, were selected as first-team players on the 1947 College Football All-America Team. They are:

Position	Name	Team	Selectors
Halfback	Bob Chappuis	Michigan	AP, UP, AFCA, CO, NEA, CP, INS, TSN, WCFF, FWAA
Halfback	Bump Elliott	Michigan	AFCA

== 1948 NFL draft ==
The following Big Nine players were among the first 100 picks in the 1948 NFL draft:

Name	Position	Team	Round	Overall pick
Jug Girard	Back	Wisconsin	1	7
Les Bingaman	Tackle	Illinois	3	15
Jack Weisenburger	Fullback	Michigan	6	38
Larry Olsonoski	Guard	Minnesota	6	41
Howard Duncan	Center	Ohio State	6	42
Bob Brugge	Back	Ohio State	6	44
Phil O'Reilly	Tackle	Purdue	6	45
Bob Pfohl	Back	Purdue	7	46
Bob Cunz	Tackle	Illinois	8	61
Ken Wiltgen	End	Northwestern	9	71
Dick Deranek	Back	Indiana	10	82
Dick Flanagan	End	Ohio State	10	83
Jim Brieske	Center	Michigan	11	97
