= 1947 Wisconsin Badgers football team =

American college football season

1947 Wisconsin Badgers football
- Conference: Big Nine Conference
- Record: 5–3–1 (3–2–1 Big Nine)
- Head coach: Harry Stuhldreher (12th season)
- MVP: Red Wilson
- Captain: Jack Wink
- Home stadium: Camp Randall Stadium

1947 Big Nine Conference football standings
	Conf.					Overall
Team	W		L		T	W		L		T
No. 2 Michigan $	6	–	0	–	0	10	–	0	–	0
Wisconsin	3	–	2	–	1	5	–	3	–	1
Minnesota	3	–	3	–	0	6	–	3	–	0
Illinois	3	–	3	–	0	5	–	3	–	1
Purdue	3	–	3	–	0	5	–	4	–	0
Indiana	2	–	3	–	1	5	–	3	–	1
Iowa	2	–	3	–	1	3	–	5	–	1
Northwestern	2	–	4	–	0	3	–	6	–	0
Ohio State	1	–	4	–	1	2	–	6	–	1
$ – Conference champion; Rankings from AP Poll

The 1947 Wisconsin Badgers football team was an American football team that represented the University of Wisconsin in the 1947 Big Nine Conference football season. The team compiled a 5–3–1 record (3–2–1 against conference opponents) and finished in second place in the Big Nine Conference. Harry Stuhldreher was in his 12th year as Wisconsin's head coach. The team was ranked No. 9 in the AP Poll before losing to Michigan on November 15, 1947. The team averaged 280.1 yards per game of total offense, 205.9 yards per game by rushing, and 74.2 by passing.

The team's statistical leaders included Clarence Self with 526 rushing yards, Jug Girard with 322 passing yards, Tom Bennett with 95 receiving yards, and Lisle Blackbourn, Jr., with 39 points scored. Center Red Wilson received the team's most valuable player award; Wilson also received first-team honors from the Associated Press, United Press, and International News Service on the 1947 All-Big Nine Conference football team. Jack Wink was the team captain.

Several Wisconsin records were set during the 1947 season, including the following:

- In a game against Iowa on November 8, Jug Girard set four Iowa single game records: 158 punt return yards; two punt returns for touchdowns, an 85-yard return; and an average of 52.7 yards per return. Three of those record still stand (the record for longest punt return was broken in 1970).
- In a game against Purdue on September 27, Clarence Self set Iowa's single game record with an average of 12.7 yards per carry (10 carries for 127 yards). That record stood for 26 years.
- In a game against Michigan on November 15, Clarence Self set Iowa's single game record with 178 kickoff return yards. That record stood for 60 years.

Wisconsin was ranked at No. 16 (out of 500 college football teams) in the final Litkenhous Ratings for 1947.

The team played its home games at Camp Randall Stadium. During the 1947 season, the average attendance at home games was 44,200.

== Schedule ==
Date	Opponent	Rank	Site	Result	Attendance	Source
September 27	Purdue		Camp Randall Stadium; Madison, WI	W 32–14	38,000	
October 4	at Indiana^{†}		Memorial Stadium; Bloomington, IN	T 7–7	30,000	
October 11	No. 8 California*		Camp Randall Stadium; Madison, WI	L 7–48	45,000	
October 18	at No. 12 Yale*		Yale Bowl; New Haven, CT	W 9–0	65,000	
October 25	Marquette*		Camp Randall Stadium; Madison, WI	W 35–12	45,000	
November 1	at Northwestern		Dyche Stadium; Evanston, IL	W 29–0	43,000	
November 8	Iowa^{†}	No. 19	Camp Randall Stadium; Madison, WI (rivalry)	W 46–14	45,000	
November 15	No. 2 Michigan	No. 9	Camp Randall Stadium; Madison, WI	L 6–40	45,000	
November 22	at Minnesota		Memorial Stadium; Minneapolis, MN (rivalry)	L 0–21	63,862	
*Non-conference game; ^{†}Homecoming; Rankings from AP Poll released prior to the game

== Rankings ==
Ranking movements Legend: ██ Increase in ranking ██ Decrease in ranking — = Not ranked
	Week									
Poll	1	2	3	4	5	6	7	8	9	Final
AP	—	—	—	—	19	9	—	—	—	—
