= Bump Elliott =

American athlete, coach, and administrator (1925–2019)

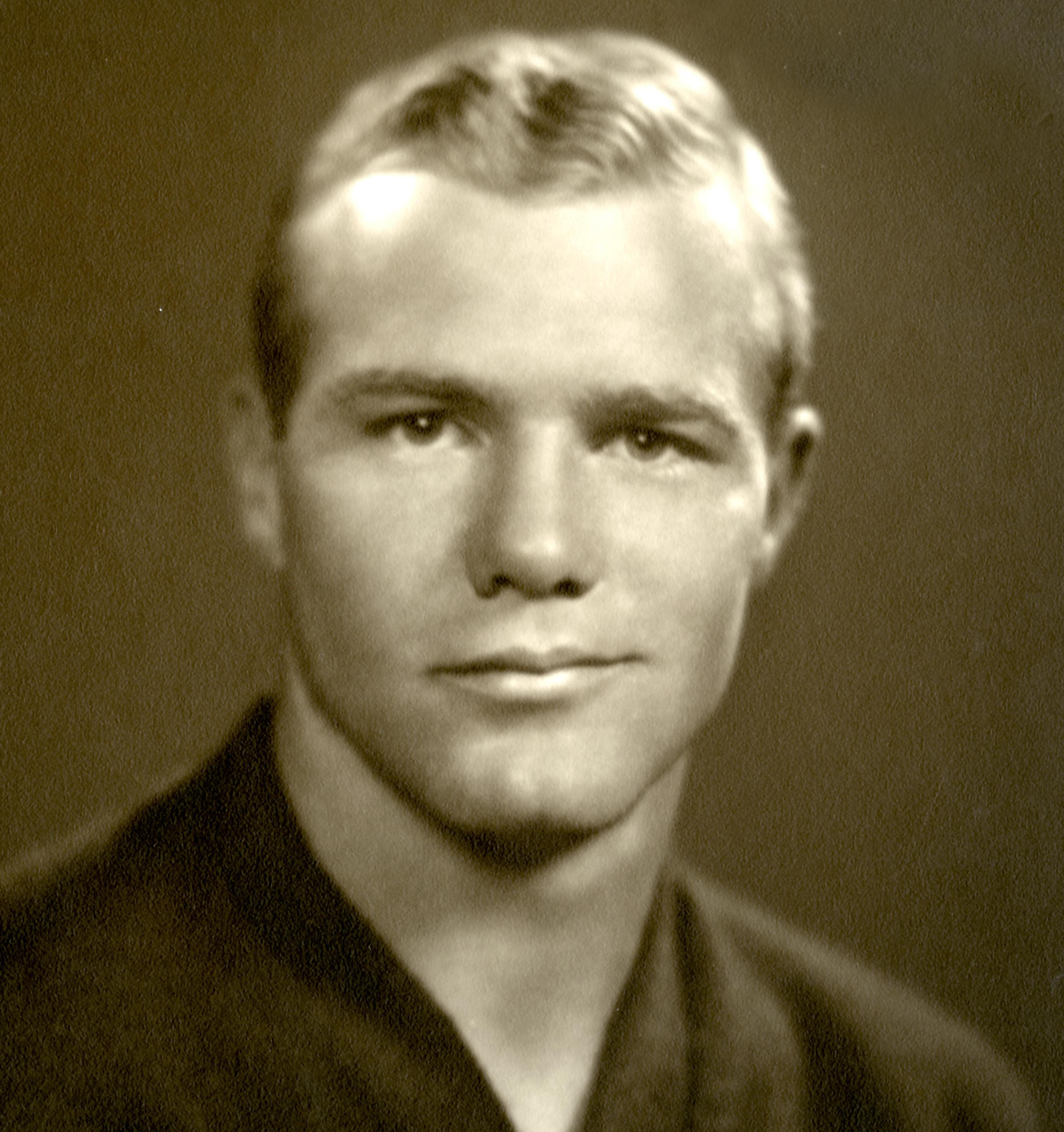
- Elliott in 1947

Biographical details
- Born: January 30, 1925; Detroit, Michigan, U.S.
- Died: December 7, 2019 (aged 94); Iowa City, Iowa, U.S.

Playing career
- 1943–1944: Purdue
- 1946–1947: Michigan
- Position: Halfback

Coaching career (HC unless noted)
- 1948: Michigan (backfield)
- 1949–1951: Oregon State (assistant)
- 1952–1956: Iowa (assistant)
- 1957–1958: Michigan (backfield)
- 1959–1968: Michigan

Administrative career (AD unless noted)
- 1969–1970: Michigan (associate AD)
- 1970–1991: Iowa

Head coaching record
- Overall: 51–42–2
- Bowls: 1–0

Accomplishments and honors

Championships
- 1 Big Ten (1964)

Awards
- First-team All-American (1947); Chicago Tribune Silver Football (1947); First-team All-Big Nine (1947); Rose Bowl Hall of Fame (1989)
- College Football Hall of Fame; Inducted in 1989 (profile)

Chalmers William "Bump" Elliott (January 30, 1925 – December 7, 2019) was an American football player, coach, and college athletics administrator. He played halfback at Purdue University (1943–1944) and the University of Michigan (1946–1947). Elliott grew up in Bloomington, Illinois, enlisted in the United States Marine Corps as a senior in high school and was assigned to the V-12 Navy College Training Program at Purdue University. He received varsity letters in football, baseball, and basketball at Purdue, before being called into active duty in late 1944, serving with the Marines in China.

After being discharged from the military, he enrolled at the University of Michigan in 1946 and joined the football team for whom his brother Pete Elliott played quarterback. In 1947, he played for an undefeated and untied Michigan football team known as the "Mad Magicians", led the Big Nine Conference in scoring, won the Chicago Tribune Silver Football trophy as the Most Valuable Player of the conference, and was selected as an All-American by the American Football Coaches Association.

After graduating from Michigan in 1948, Elliott spent ten years as an assistant football coach at Oregon State, Iowa, and Michigan. He was appointed as Michigan's head football coach in 1959 and held that position until 1968, leading the team to a Big Ten Conference championship and Rose Bowl victory in the 1964 season. For a period of 21 years, from 1970 to 1991, he was the athletic director at the University of Iowa. During his tenure as athletic director, he hired coaches Dan Gable, Hayden Fry, Lute Olson, C. Vivian Stringer, and Dr. Tom Davis, and the Iowa Hawkeyes won 41 Big Ten Conference championships and 11 NCAA titles. In 1989, Elliott was inducted into the College Football Hall of Fame.

== Early life ==
Chalmers William Elliott was born in Detroit, but grew up in Bloomington, Illinois. His father, J. Norman Elliott, was an ears, nose and throat doctor who also coached football at Illinois Wesleyan University from 1930 to 1934. Elliott's given name is Chalmers, but he was known by the nickname "Bump" since he was six months old, though no one remembered how he received the nickname, "not even his mother."

Elliott and his younger brother, Pete Elliott, both played football together for Bloomington High School, where Bump was an All-State halfback in 1942, and Pete made it as a fullback in 1943. Had it not been for World War II, Bump and Pete likely would have attended the University of Illinois, which was about 50 miles from their home in Bloomington. However, both brothers wanted to get into the V-12 Navy College Training Program, and Illinois did not have such a program. Bump enlisted in the United States Marine Corps while still a senior in high school and was called to active duty in 1943. He was assigned to the V-12 officer training program at Purdue University. His brother, Pete, also enlisted and was assigned to officer training at Michigan.

== Purdue University and military service ==
Elliott attended Purdue from 1943 to 1944. In his freshman year, Elliott earned varsity letters in football, basketball and baseball. He played three games for the unbeaten and untied 1943 Purdue Boilermakers football team and was described as "a capable triple-threater and stellar defensive performer." He scored a touchdown against Minnesota in his first game, and made a key interception at Purdue's ten-yard line in the season's final game against Indiana. A May 1944 newspaper article reported that the 19-year-old Elliott, who had been a "high school sensation last year," had won three major athletic letters in his first year as a Naval V-12 student at Purdue. "A speedy 160-pound, five foot 10-inch performer, he lost little time making his mark in football last fall once he became eligible upon completion of his first V-12 term." Elliott appeared in the final three games of the football season, and his performance in the season's final game against Indiana "provided one of the highlights of the Boilermaker season."

In basketball, he was "consistent as a guard on Purdue's cage combination." In baseball, Elliott played shortstop and center field, where he was "a steady fielder with a strong arm." In a May 1944 game, Elliott led the Boilermakers to a 17–4 win over Wisconsin, with five hits, five stolen bases, four RBIs, three runs scored, and four putouts in center field. His performance against Wisconsin was "one of the biggest baseball days ever turned" by a Big Ten baseball player.

Elliott played in the first six games of the 1944 football season for Purdue before being transferred by the Marine Corps. In a game against Marquette in late September, he broke up a 7–7 tie with successive touchdown runs of 24 and 71 yards. He was also the only defensive player in 1944 to pull down Illinois' Buddy Young from behind. Elliott received orders to report for active duty in October 1944, and he played his last game in a Purdue uniform against the Michigan Wolverines on October 28, 1944. In November 1944, Elliott was sent to Parris Island. He was later sent to China and emerged from the war as a Marine lieutenant.

== University of Michigan ==
Elliott and his younger brother, Pete, were teammates again at Michigan in 1946 and 1947. After his discharge from the military, Bump joined Pete at Michigan, where Pete played quarterback and Bump was the right halfback for the undefeated 1947 team. Before the 1948 Rose Bowl, one article noted that the two brothers roomed together at Michigan and arranged their programs so that their classes were identical. The article observed: "They look alike, act alike and think alike and in Ann Arbor, Mich., when they walk down the street any Michigan student can recognize Bump and Pete, the inseparable Elliott Brothers, Wolverines right half and quarterback respectively." The brothers shared the same distinctive golden red hair, and the two were so close that they told a reporter in 1947 that a girl had to receive "the Bumper stamp of approval" before passing Pete's test.

=== 1946 season ===
After being discharged from the Marine Corps, Elliott attended the University of Michigan, where he joined his brother, Pete, in Michigan's backfield. Elliott "practically stepped off a World War II transport from Marine Corps duty in China to Michigan's Ferry Field and stardom." With less than a week of conditioning after his discharge from the Marines, he was reported to be giving Michigan's coaching staff "something lovely to look at."

In a 14–14 tie with Northwestern in mid-October 1946, Elliott scored all 14 of Michigan's points. He scored the first touchdown late in the first quarter on a 37-yard pass from Bob Chappuis in the corner of the end zone. In the fourth quarter, Michigan fullback Bob Wiese intercepted a pass on Michigan's 1-yard line, and lateralled to Elliott on the Michigan 40-yard line. From that point, Elliott ran it back 60 yards down the sideline for his second touchdown. He again scored two touchdowns in Michigan's 21–0 win over Minnesota on November 2. He also helped Michigan to a 28–6 win over Wisconsin with a bullet pass to end Bob Mann in the end zone.

=== Big Nine MVP in 1947 ===
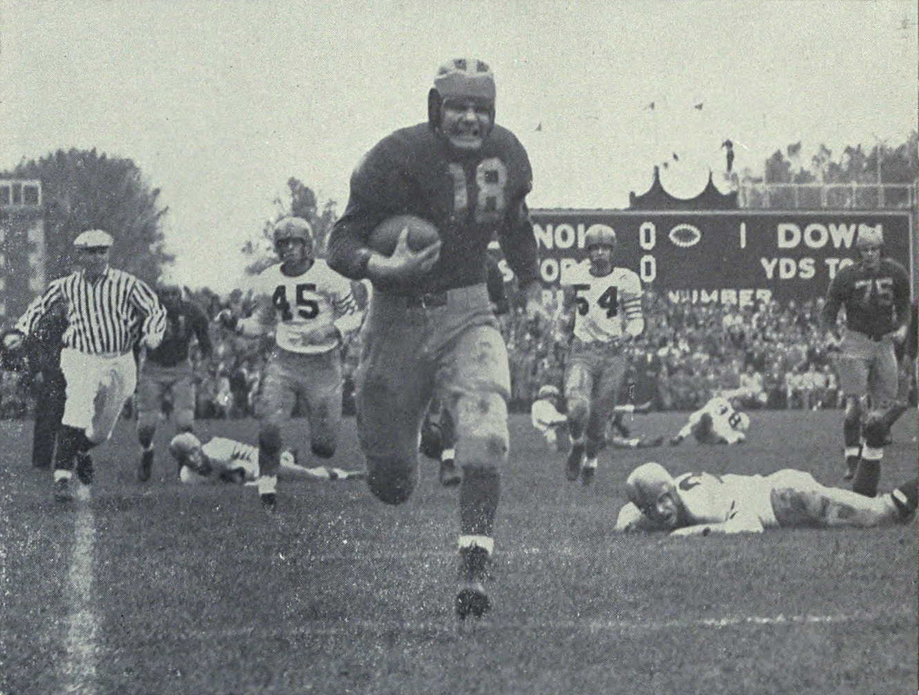
Elliott runs 74 yards for a touchdown against Illinois, 1945

In 1947, Elliott played for the Wolverines team known as the "Mad Magicians" that went undefeated and untied, beating the USC Trojans, 49–0, in the 1948 Rose Bowl. The team is considered to be the greatest Michigan team of all time. Along with Bob Chappuis, Elliott was one of the key players in Michigan's undefeated season. He led the Big Nine Conference in scoring, made the All-American team picked by the American Football Coaches Association (AFCA), and was voted Most Valuable Player in the Big Nine, winning the Chicago Tribune Silver Football trophy. Elliott was one of two Michigan players in 1947, along with fullback Jack Weisenburger, who played both offense and defense. Indeed, Elliott was actually a four-way threat as he contributed in rushing, receiving, punt returns, and defense. He scored a total of 12 touchdowns in 1947—eight rushing, two receiving, one on a punt return, and another on an interception return. He contributed 911 all-purpose yardage – 438 rushing, 318 receiving, and 155 on punt returns. He averaged 6.4 yards per carry as a rusher, 19.9 yards per reception, and 17.2 yards per punt return. Michigan head coach Fritz Crisler called Elliott the greatest right halfback he had ever seen.

Elliott had a breakthrough season that began with the team's "Blue" versus "White" exhibition game in mid-September in which he scored four touchdowns, including 50- and 60-yard runs. He scored touchdowns in each of the team's early season wins over Michigan State (55–0), Stanford (49–13), and Pitt (69–0). His touchdown against Pitt came on defense, as he intercepted a pass and ran it back 37 yards. In the Big Nine opener against Northwestern, Elliott scored on a nine-yard run less than two minutes after the game started, as the Wolverines won, 49–21. In Michigan's closest contest of the 1947 season, a 13–6 win over Minnesota, Elliott caught a 40-yard pass from Bob Chappuis on his fingertips at the Minnesota 15-yard line and went on to score with a minute and 15 seconds to go in the first half. Said one reporter: "It was the exceptional speed of Elliott on this play that turned the tide. He completely outmaneuvered the Minnesota secondary."

The biggest challenge of the 1947 season came in a 14–7 win over Illinois. The Associated Press (AP) described Elliott as Michigan's "Big Cog" in the Illinois game, and the United Press proclaimed: "Bump Elliott Steals Show in 14 to 7 Defeat of Illinois Saturday." In the first quarter, he ran back a punt 75 yards for a touchdown, as Bob Mann "bulldozed the path with a vicious block", and "the Bloomington blaster scampered down the sidelines." Elliott also set up the Wolverines second score with a long reception to the Illinois four-yard line. He also played a key role on defense, intercepting a pass at the Michigan nine-yard line to halt an Illinois drive. Another article concluded: "The individual hero was Bump Elliott, a 168-pound halfback who loped 74 yards for one touchdown and caught a pass for a 52 yard gain to set up the second and winning marker."

Elliott finished the season scoring two touchdowns each in games against Indiana and Ohio State. At the end of the season, Elliott and Chappuis both received 16 of 18 possible points in voting by the AP for the All-Big Nine football team. Elliott weighed only 160 pounds (72.6 kg; 11 st 6.0 lb) during his All-American season in 1947. Asked later about how he managed to compete at his weight, Elliott noted, "I was awful lucky to get by at that weight."

=== 1948 Rose Bowl against USC ===
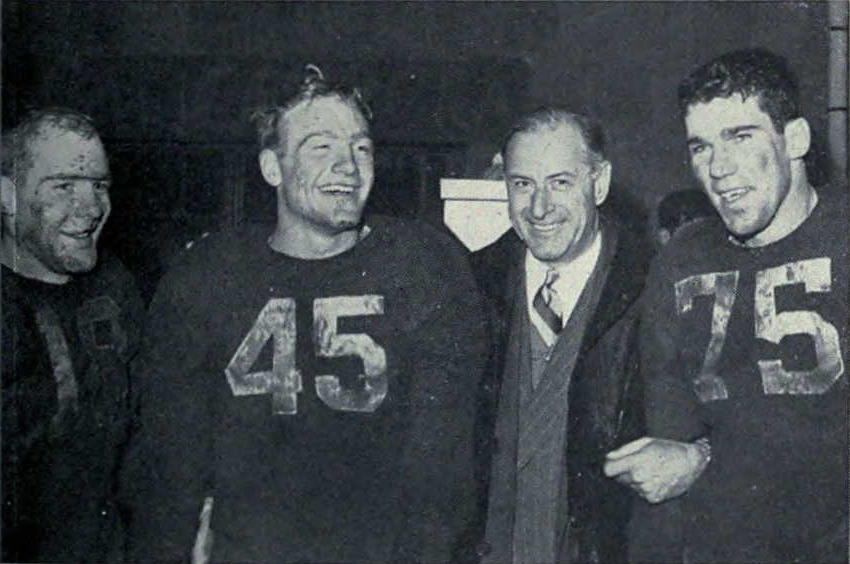
Elliot, brother Pete (No. 45), Fritz Crisler and Bruce Hilkene (No. 75) celebrate Big 9 championship after defeating Wisconsin.

As the Big Nine Conference champions, the 1947 Wolverines were invited to play in the 1948 Rose Bowl game against the USC Trojans. Michigan dominated the game, winning 49–0, as "the shifty Chappuis and the speedy Elliott began to fake (the Trojans) out of their shoes." Elliott scored on an 11-yard touchdown pass from Chappuis. In August 1948, Elliott was chosen as the captain of the College All-Stars in their game against the Chicago Cardinals at Soldier Field. Injured in practice, Elliott was unable to play as the Cardinals beat the All-Stars, 28–0.

=== Application for 1948 eligibility denied ===
Elliott applied for an extra year of eligibility in 1948. Due to his military service, he played in only three games as a freshman and six games in his sophomore season. Under the Big Nine Conference code, he was eligible for a fifth season due to a war-caused stay at Purdue in 1943 and 1944. However, his request was denied by the Big Nine Conference. The decision was criticized by Michigan's representative on the Big Nine faculty committee as a "grave injustice." Nonetheless, Elliott set the Michigan career interception return yards record that stood for five years until Don Oldham pushed the record from 174 yards to 181 yards. His 174 career yards still ranks fifth in school history.

== Coaching career ==
The Elliott brothers served as assistant coaches together at Oregon State University in 1949 and 1950, before going their separate ways. The Elliotts' coached against each other in the early 1960s while Bump was the head football coach at Michigan and Pete held the same position at the University of Illinois. In November 1963, Pete Elliott's Illinois team was ranked No. 2 in the country and the favorite for the Rose Bowl when it faced off against Bump Elliott's Michigan team. Michigan had a record of 2–3–1 when the brothers met in 1963, but Michigan came out on top, 14–8, marking the fourth time in four games that Bump's Wolverines came out on top of brother Pete's Illini.

After graduating from Michigan, Bump turned down an offer to play professional football for the Detroit Lions of the National Football League (NFL), saying he said he had obtained a job in Chicago outside of football. Elliott also considered going into medicine as his father had done, but he chose instead to go into coaching. He started his coaching career at Michigan in the fall of 1948 as assistant backfield coach. In the spring of 1949, he was hired as an assistant coach under Kip Taylor at Oregon State, where he remained for three seasons, from 1949 to 1951. Elliott later recalled, "I was only 24 when Kip Taylor hired me as backfield coach at Oregon State, and it bothered me a little because there were two backs on the squad who were older than I was." It was even worse for his brother Pete, who was 22 when he was hired to coach the ends. Bump recalled: "After practice one night some players noticed Pete light up a cigarette. One of his ends drew Pete aside and said in a fatherly voice, 'You shouldn't smoke, coach; I didn't do it when I was your age." Oregon State had an overall record of 14–15 in Elliott's three years as an assistant coach.

In 1952, Elliott was hired as an assistant at the University of Iowa under its head coach, Forest Evashevski, another former All-American at the Michigan. On being hired at Iowa, Elliott said, "I should feel at home back in the Big Ten. I grew up in Bloomington – 40 miles from Illinois. I played at Purdue and Michigan and coached at Michigan. My father went to Iowa and Northwestern and now I'm coaching at Iowa." He stayed at Iowa until 1957. Elliott was with the Hawkeyes in 1956 when they went 9–1, won the Big Ten championship, and defeated his former team, Oregon State, 35–19, in the 1957 Rose Bowl game.

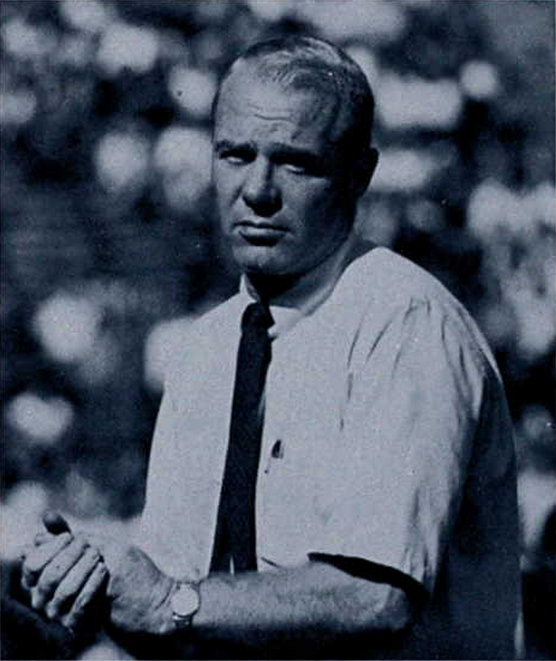
Elliott from the 1962 Michiganensian

Elliott returned to Michigan in 1957 as a backfield coach under Bennie Oosterbaan. In 1959, Elliott was elevated to head football coach at Michigan. He was the head coach for ten years from 1959 to 1968, posting a career record of 51–42–2, for a .547 winning percentage. In Big Ten Conference play, his record was 32–34–2 (.485).

Although his tenure at Michigan was unsuccessful by the school's historic standards, he did lead the 1964 Wolverines to a 9–1 record, a Big Ten title and a win in the 1965 Rose Bowl against Oregon State. His final team, in 1968, won eight of its first nine games but then suffered a humiliating 50–14 loss against Ohio State. Despite having a 36-point lead, Ohio State Coach Woody Hayes passed for, and failed to get, a two-point conversion after the final score and with 1:23 remaining in the game. When asked why he went for the two-point conversion, Hayes reportedly said, "Because we couldn't go for three!" Shortly after the game, Elliott resigned, and athletic director Don Canham hired Bo Schembechler to replace him as head coach. Schembechler would use the memory of the 1968 Ohio State loss to motivate his team the following season.

There were reports during the 1968 season that Elliott had been given an ultimatum: "Either win or face the possibility of being kicked upstairs." There were also reports when Don Canham was hired that Elliott had expected to be named athletic director and that there was "bad blood" between Canham and Elliott.

However, Canham later denied that Elliott was "eased out" of his job. In an interview with Joe Falls, Canham said: "Bump and I are close personal friends. Bump is not naïve – he knows that when you work at a place for 10 years and you're not winning consistently, it doesn't become fun for anybody – the coach, the alumni, the players or anybody else. We talked about this and we talked about it openly. If Bump had said to me, 'Look, give me a couple of more years,' I would have given it to him. I mean that. I didn't fire Bump Elliott. My first year as director Bump had an 8 and 2 record. Anyone could live with that."

According to Canham, he met with Elliott in December 1968 and offered him the job of associate athletic director. Canham told Elliott he could stay on as coach if he wanted, but Canham could not promise him that the job of associate athletic director would still be open in another couple of years. Canham said: "Bump smiled at me and said, 'I don't have to think about it.' He was ready to get out. I did not force him, and I mean that in all honesty. But the job had ceased to be fun for him."

Schembechler later recalled that he remained loyal to Elliott when he took over as Michigan's head coach in 1969. When Schembechler won the Big Ten championship in 1969, he said, "I made certain I let everyone know I won with Bump's kids. Bump was a man of great class and he showed it to me again and again in that first year, never getting in the way, always trying to be helpful, always trying to encourage me." After Michigan won the 1969 Ohio State game, the team presented the game ball to Elliott, and Schembechler noted that "I don't remember when I felt happier about anything in my life."

From 1969 to 1970, Elliott was the associate director of athletics at Michigan.

== Athletic director at Iowa ==
Elliott became the men's athletic director at the University of Iowa in 1970, succeeding Forest Evashevski. He came to Iowa in the midst of a feud between Evashevski and football coach Ray Nagel. Evashevski resigned in May 1970, and Elliott was hired to replace him. On accepting the job, Elliott noted: "It's difficult to leave a town where you've lived for 13 years (Ann Arbor, Michigan), but the opportunity is so good at Iowa with the people and the school that no one could pass it up."

During Elliott's tenure, the school's teams won 34 Big Ten championships and 11 NCAA titles, as well as making three Rose Bowl appearances and one trip to the Final Four in basketball. The university also built a basketball arena (Carver-Hawkeye Arena), erected an indoor workout center for football and added more than 10,000 seats to its football stadium. His career at Iowa was marked by a general resurgence in the competitiveness of Iowa athletics. Elliott hired a number of notable coaches, including Lute Olson, Dan Gable, Hayden Fry, and Dr. Tom Davis. During Elliott's 21 years as athletic director, the Iowa Hawkeyes won 41 Big Ten championships in football (1981, 1985, 1990), wrestling (1974–1990), men's basketball (1970, 1979), baseball (1972, 1974, 1990), men's gymnastics (1972, 1974, 1986), men's swimming (1981, 1982).

Elliott was known as "a coach's AD." "He hired coaches he trusted, then gave them the resources, latitude and support they needed to operate as they saw fit – providing they played by the rules." Iowa wrestling coach Dan Gable said his wife cried on learning that Elliott had retired. In 1999, Gable wrote: "Right after I came to coach at the University of Iowa, I had a meeting with Bump Elliott, who was the Athletic Director. I'll never forget what Bump said to me: 'Don't ask for the moon. Strive to get there, sure, but do it wisely through continuing to build upon what you already have. As you build, come see me, and we'll see how I can help you out.' I now call that bit of wisdom the Bump Elliott Rule, and it serves a good reminder to keep things in perspective. Gradual, solid growth is better than any quick fix.""The one thing we emphasized from the start was that our staff had to make sure we were 100 percent loyal to each other and the university," Elliott said at the time of his retirement. "There could be no jealousy between the coaches and various programs I wanted no one talking behind anyone's backs. I wanted absolute loyalty. If not, then that person could leave any time."

Elliott was also the one who hired Hayden Fry as Iowa's football coach in 1979. Fry later said that Elliott was one of the principal reasons he chose to coach at Iowa. In his autobiography, Fry wrote: "Iowa had one thing in its favor as far as I was concerned: Bump Elliott was its athletic director. Bump had a reputation as being a fair, honest and well-liked administrator." Elliott told Fry that he would be the last football coach Bump ever hired. Fry was puzzled and asked Elliott what he meant. Elliott said, "Simple, I don't think they'll give me a chance to hire another coach, so if you don't make it, neither will I." He is the only person to have been with Rose Bowl teams in five capacities – player, assistant coach, head coach, assistant athletic director, and athletic director.

== Family and later life ==
Elliott and his wife, Barbara, met while he was with the Marine Corps at Purdue and she was studying pre-school education there. They married in 1949, and had three children, Bill (born October 1951), Bob (1953–2017), and Betsy (born c. 1955). Son Bob Elliott was Iowa's defensive coordinator under Hayden Fry in the 1990s.

Elliott lived in his later years at the Oaknoll Retirement Community in Iowa City. He died on December 7, 2019, at age 94.

== Honors and accolades ==
Elliott received numerous honors and accolades, including the following:

- Recipient of the Chicago Tribune Silver Football as the Most Valuable Player in the Big Nine Conference in 1947;
- Selected as an All-American by the American Football Coaches Association in 1947;
- Inducted into the University of Michigan Hall of Honor in 1986 for his contributions in football, basketball, baseball, and as a football coach;
- Inducted into the College Football Hall of Fame in 1989;
- Inducted into the National Iowa Varsity Club Hall of Fame in 1997;
- Inducted into the Michigan Sports Hall of Fame in 2002; and
- Elliott Drive, the Iowa City street on which Carver-Hawkeye Arena is located, is named in his honor. The sculpture of the 12' stainless steel hawk, Strike Force, is located in a small park just south of Carver-Hawkeye arena. In addition to the street in his name and the sculpture, a scholarship in Elliott's name were all spearheaded by his good friend Earle Murphy to honor Bump and future Iowa athletes.

== Head coaching record ==
Year	Team	Overall	Conference	Standing	Bowl/playoffs	Coaches^{#}	AP^{°}
Michigan Wolverines (Big Ten Conference) (1959–1968)
1959	Michigan	4–5	3–4	7th			
1960	Michigan	5–4	3–4	T–5th			
1961	Michigan	6–3	3–3	6th			
1962	Michigan	2–7	1–6	10th			
1963	Michigan	3–4–2	2–3–2	7th			
1964	Michigan	9–1	6–1	1st	W Rose	4	4
1965	Michigan	4–6	2–5	T–7th			
1966	Michigan	6–4	4–3	T–3rd			
1967	Michigan	4–6	3–4	T–5th			
1968	Michigan	8–2	6–1	2nd		15	12
Michigan:		51–42–2	32–34–2				
Total:		51–42–2					
National championship Conference title Conference division title or championship game berth
^{#}Rankings from final Coaches Poll.; ^{°}Rankings from final AP Poll.

== See also ==
- University of Michigan Athletic Hall of Honor
