= 1947 Illinois Fighting Illini football team =

American college football season

1947 Illinois Fighting Illini football
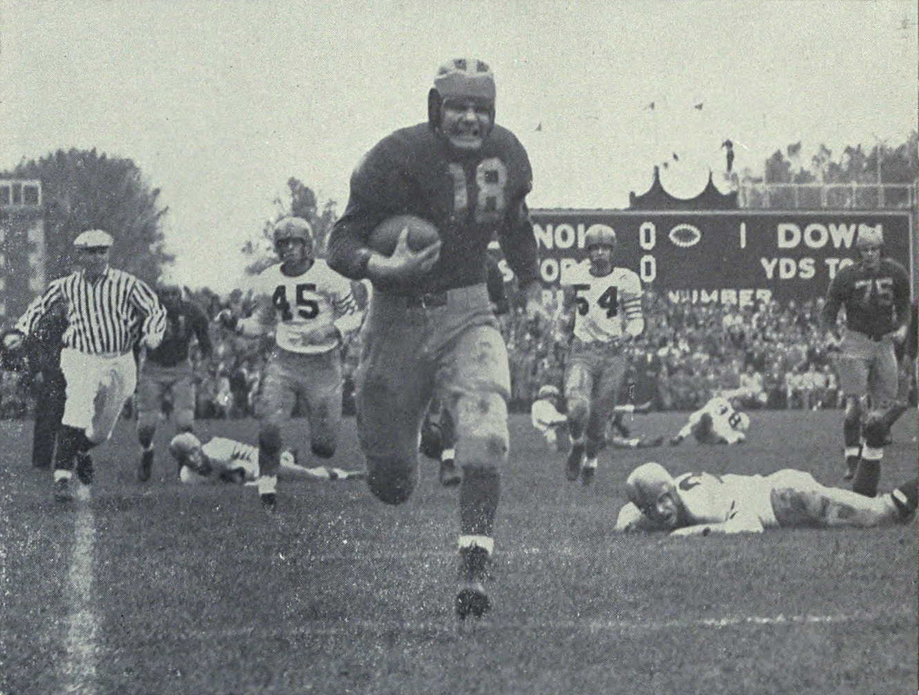
- Michigan's Bump Elliott on a 74 yard touchdown run against Illinois in 1947
- Conference: Big Nine Conference
- Record: 5–3–1 (3–3 Big Nine)
- Head coach: Ray Eliot (6th season)
- MVP: Ike Owens
- Captain: Art Duffelmeier
- Home stadium: Memorial Stadium

1947 Big Nine Conference football standings
	Conf.					Overall
Team	W		L		T	W		L		T
No. 2 Michigan $	6	–	0	–	0	10	–	0	–	0
Wisconsin	3	–	2	–	1	5	–	3	–	1
Minnesota	3	–	3	–	0	6	–	3	–	0
Illinois	3	–	3	–	0	5	–	3	–	1
Purdue	3	–	3	–	0	5	–	4	–	0
Indiana	2	–	3	–	1	5	–	3	–	1
Iowa	2	–	3	–	1	3	–	5	–	1
Northwestern	2	–	4	–	0	3	–	6	–	0
Ohio State	1	–	4	–	1	2	–	6	–	1
$ – Conference champion; Rankings from AP Poll

The 1947 Illinois Fighting Illini football team was an American football team that represented the University of Illinois during the 1947 Big Nine Conference football season. In their sixth year under head coach Ray Eliot, the Illini compiled a 5–3–1 record and finished in a three-way tie for third place in the Big Ten Conference. The team played No. 5 Army to a scoreless tie and narrowly lost by a 14–7 score to undefeated national champion Michigan. Illinois was unranked in the final AP poll but was ranked at No. 8 in the final Litkenhous Ratings for 1947.

End Ike Owens was selected as the team's most valuable player. Six Illinois players received honors on the 1947 All-Big Nine Conference football team: Owens (AP-1, UP-1, INS-1); fullback Russ Steger (AP-1, UP-1, INS-1); tackle Lou Agase (AP-1, INS-1); quarterback Perry Moss (AP-2, INS-2); guard John Wrenn (AP-2, INS-2); center Lou Levanti (AP-2, INS-2).

The team played its home games at Memorial Stadium in Champaign, Illinois.

== Schedule ==
Date	Opponent	Rank	Site	Result	Attendance	Source
September 27	Pittsburgh*		Memorial Stadium; Champaign, IL	W 14–0	22,079	
October 4	at Iowa		Iowa Stadium; Iowa City, IA	W 35–12	52,294	
October 11	at No. 5 Army*	No. 6	Yankee Stadium; Bronx, NY	T 0–0	65,000	
October 18	No. 13 Minnesota	No. 6	Memorial Stadium; Champaign, IL	W 40–13	56,048	
October 25	at Purdue	No. 5	Ross–Ade Stadium; West Lafayette, IN (rivalry)	L 7–14	42,000	
November 1	No. 2 Michigan^{†}	No. 11	Memorial Stadium; Champaign, IL (rivalry)	L 7–14	71,119	
November 8	Western Michigan*	No. 11	Memorial Stadium; Champaign, IL	W 60–14	24,012	
November 15	at Ohio State	No. 11	Ohio Stadium; Columbus, OH (Illibuck)	W 28–7	70,036	
November 22	Northwestern	No. 12	Memorial Stadium; Champaign, IL (rivalry)	L 13–28	52,158	
*Non-conference game; ^{†}Homecoming; Rankings from AP Poll released prior to the game

== Rankings ==
Ranking movements Legend: ██ Increase in ranking ██ Decrease in ranking — = Not ranked ( ) = First-place votes
	Week									
Poll	1	2	3	4	5	6	7	8	9	Final
AP	6	6 (1)	5	11	11	11	12	—	—	—
