= 1947 Indiana Hoosiers football team =

American college football season

1947 Indiana Hoosiers football
- Conference: Big Nine Conference
- Record: 5–3–1 (2–3–1 Big Nine)
- Head coach: Bo McMillin (14th season)
- MVP: Howie Brown
- Captain: Howie Brown
- Home stadium: Memorial Stadium

1947 Big Nine Conference football standings
	Conf.					Overall
Team	W		L		T	W		L		T
No. 2 Michigan $	6	–	0	–	0	10	–	0	–	0
Wisconsin	3	–	2	–	1	5	–	3	–	1
Minnesota	3	–	3	–	0	6	–	3	–	0
Illinois	3	–	3	–	0	5	–	3	–	1
Purdue	3	–	3	–	0	5	–	4	–	0
Indiana	2	–	3	–	1	5	–	3	–	1
Iowa	2	–	3	–	1	3	–	5	–	1
Northwestern	2	–	4	–	0	3	–	6	–	0
Ohio State	1	–	4	–	1	2	–	6	–	1
$ – Conference champion; Rankings from AP Poll

The 1947 Indiana Hoosiers football team was an American football team that represented the Indiana University in the 1947 Big Nine Conference football season. The team compiled a 5–3–1 record (2–3–1 in conference play), and finished in tie for sixth place in the Big Ten Conference. The Hoosiers played their home games at Memorial Stadium in Bloomington, Indiana. The team was coached by Bo McMillin, in his 14th and final year as head coach of the Hoosiers. McMillin retired from his position as head coach at the end of the year.

Three Indiana players received honors from Associated Press (AP), United Press (UP), or International News Service (INS) on the 1947 All-Big Nine Conference football team: guard Howie Brown (AP-1, INS-1, UP-1); halfback George Taliaferro (AP-2, INS-2); and end Lou Mihajlovich (AP-2, INS-2).

Indiana was ranked at No. 17 (out of 500 college football teams) in the final Litkenhous Ratings for 1947.

== Schedule ==
Date	Opponent	Site	Result	Attendance	Source
September 27	at Nebraska	Memorial Stadium; Lincoln, NE	W 17–0	33,000	
October 4	Wisconsin	Memorial Stadium; Bloomington, IN	T 7–7	30,000	
October 11	at Iowa	Iowa Stadium; Iowa City, IA	L 14–27	51,000	
October 18	Pittsburgh*	Memorial Stadium; Bloomington, IN	W 41–6	25,000	
October 25	at Northwestern	Dyche Stadium; Evanston, IL	L 6–7	42,000	
November 1	at Ohio State	Ohio Stadium; Columbus, OH	W 7–0	75,882	
November 8	at No. 2 Michigan	Michigan Stadium; Ann Arbor, MI	L 0–35	85,938	
November 15	Marquette*	Memorial Stadium; Bloomington, IN	W 48–6	15,000	
November 22	Purdue	Memorial Stadium; Bloomington, IN (Old Oaken Bucket)	W 16–14	33,500	
*Non-conference game; Rankings from AP Poll released prior to the game

== 1948 NFL draftees ==
Three Indiana players were selected in the 1948 NFL draft, as follows:

Player	Position	Round	Pick	NFL club
Dick Deranek	Back	10	82	Pittsburgh Steelers
Harry "Chick" Jagade	Back	14	118	Washington Redskins
Rex Grossman	Back	29	273	Philadelphia Eagles
