= 1947 Minnesota Golden Gophers football team =

American college football season

1947 Minnesota Golden Gophers football
- Conference: Big Nine Conference
- Record: 6–3 (3–3 Big Nine)
- Head coach: Bernie Bierman (13th season)
- MVP: Larry Olsonoski
- Captain: Steve Silianoff
- Home stadium: Memorial Stadium

1947 Big Nine Conference football standings
	Conf.					Overall
Team	W		L		T	W		L		T
No. 2 Michigan $	6	–	0	–	0	10	–	0	–	0
Wisconsin	3	–	2	–	1	5	–	3	–	1
Minnesota	3	–	3	–	0	6	–	3	–	0
Illinois	3	–	3	–	0	5	–	3	–	1
Purdue	3	–	3	–	0	5	–	4	–	0
Indiana	2	–	3	–	1	5	–	3	–	1
Iowa	2	–	3	–	1	3	–	5	–	1
Northwestern	2	–	4	–	0	3	–	6	–	0
Ohio State	1	–	4	–	1	2	–	6	–	1
$ – Conference champion; Rankings from AP Poll

The 1947 Minnesota Golden Gophers football team represented the University of Minnesota in the 1947 Big Nine Conference football season. In their 13th year under head coach Bernie Bierman, the Golden Gophers compiled a 6–3 record and outscored their opponents by a combined total of 174 to 127.

Guard Leo Nomellini was named All-Big Ten. Guard Larry Olsonoski was awarded the Team MVP Award.

Minnesota was ranked at No. 14 in the final Litkenhous Ratings for 1947.

Total attendance for the season was 289,612, which averaged to 57,922. The season high for attendance was against Purdue.

== Schedule ==
Date	Opponent	Rank	Site	Result	Attendance	Source
September 27	Washington*		Memorial Stadium; Minneapolis, MN	W 7–6	43,377	
October 4	at Nebraska*		Memorial Stadium; Lincoln, NE (rivalry)	W 28–13	34,500	
October 11	Northwestern	No. 17	Memorial Stadium; Minneapolis, MN	W 37–21	60,669	
October 18	at No. 6 Illinois	No. 13	Memorial Stadium; Champaign, IL	L 13–40	56,048	
October 25	at No. 1 Michigan		Michigan Stadium; Ann Arbor, MI (Little Brown Jug)	L 6–13	85,938	
November 1	Pittsburgh*		Memorial Stadium; Minneapolis, MN	W 29–0	56,334	
November 8	No. 14 Purdue^{†}		Memorial Stadium; Minneapolis, MN	W 26–21	63,659	
November 15	at Iowa	No. 20	Iowa Stadium; Iowa City, IA (rivalry)	L 7–13	50,000	
November 22	Wisconsin		Memorial Stadium; Minneapolis, MN (rivalry)	W 21–0	63,862	
*Non-conference game; ^{†}Homecoming; Rankings from AP Poll released prior to the game

== Rankings ==
Ranking movements Legend: ██ Increase in ranking ██ Decrease in ranking — = Not ranked ( ) = First-place votes
	Week									
Poll	1	2	3	4	5	6	7	8	9	Final
AP	17 (1)	13 (1)	—	—	—	20	—	19	—	—

== Game summaries ==
=== Michigan ===
Week 5: Minnesota at Michigan

Team	1	2	3	4	Total
Minnesota	0	6	0	0	6
• Michigan	0	7	0	6	13

- Date: October 25, 1947
- Location: Michigan Stadium
  Ann Arbor, Michigan
- Game attendance: 85,938

In the fifth week of the season, Minnesota a close game against Michigan by a score of 13–6. Michigan scored first on a long touchdown pass from Bob Chappuis to Bump Elliott. The final touchdown in the fourth quarter followed a 24-yard interception return by Jack Weisenburger to the Minnesota 21-yard line. Gene Derricotte scored after faking to the right and then running through a hole on the left side and into the end zone. Chappuis was held to 26 rushing yards, less than two yards per carry.
