= 1947 Iowa Hawkeyes football team =

American college football season

1947 Iowa Hawkeyes football
- Conference: Big Nine Conference
- Record: 3–5–1 (2–3–1 Big Nine)
- Head coach: Eddie Anderson (6th season)
- MVP: Harold Schoener
- Home stadium: Iowa Stadium

1947 Big Nine Conference football standings
	Conf.					Overall
Team	W		L		T	W		L		T
No. 2 Michigan $	6	–	0	–	0	10	–	0	–	0
Wisconsin	3	–	2	–	1	5	–	3	–	1
Minnesota	3	–	3	–	0	6	–	3	–	0
Illinois	3	–	3	–	0	5	–	3	–	1
Purdue	3	–	3	–	0	5	–	4	–	0
Indiana	2	–	3	–	1	5	–	3	–	1
Iowa	2	–	3	–	1	3	–	5	–	1
Northwestern	2	–	4	–	0	3	–	6	–	0
Ohio State	1	–	4	–	1	2	–	6	–	1
$ – Conference champion; Rankings from AP Poll

The 1947 Iowa Hawkeyes football team was an American football team that represented the University of Iowa in the 1947 Big Nine Conference football season. The team compiled a 3–5–1 record (2–3–1 against conference opponents) and finished in a tie for sixth place in the Big Nine Conference. After opening its season with a 59–0 shutout victory over North Dakota State, the team was outscored 179 to 86 in its remaining eight games.

Head coach Eddie Anderson was in his sixth season as Iowa's head coach; he was inducted into the College Football Hall of Fame in 1971. On the evening before the final game of the 1947 season, Anderson submitted his resignation as head coach (effective in July 1948), citing "considerable loose talk" about the state of the program. The team responded with a 13–7 victory over Minnesota. Fans begged Anderson to reconsider, and the Iowa athletic board denied his resignation, promising him a larger coaching staff and other football improvements. Anderson decided to stay, saying, "I'm glad we got things straightened out."

The team's statistical leaders included Bob Smith with 395 rushing yards and 30 points scored, Al DiMarco with 644 passing yards, and Emlen Tunnell with 262 receiving yards. Tunell later played 14 years in the National Football League and was inducted into the Pro Football Hall of Fame. Other players of note included Jack Dittmer, who later played six years in Major League Baseball, and end Harold Schoener, who was selected as the most valuable player on the 1947 Iowa team.

Iowa was ranked at No. 25 (out of 500 college football teams) in the final Litkenhous Ratings for 1947.

The team played its home games at Iowa Stadium. It drew 187,844 spectators at four home games, an average of 46,961 per game.

== Schedule ==
Date	Opponent	Site	Result	Attendance	Source
September 20	North Dakota Agricultural*	Iowa Stadium; Iowa City, IA	W 59–0	31,050	
September 26	at UCLA*	Los Angeles Memorial Coliseum; Los Angeles, CA	L 7–22	89,800	
October 4	Illinois	Iowa Stadium; Iowa City, IA	L 12–35	52,294	
October 11	Indiana^{†}	Iowa Stadium; Iowa City, IA	W 27–14	51,000	
October 18	at Ohio State	Ohio Stadium; Columbus, OH	T 13–13	72,998	
October 25	at No. 2 Notre Dame*	Notre Dame Stadium; Notre Dame, IN	L 0–21	56,000	
November 1	at No. 16 Purdue	Ross–Ade Stadium; West Lafayette, IN	L 0–21	35,000	
November 8	at No. 19 Wisconsin	Camp Randall Stadium; Madison, WI (rivalry)	L 14–46	45,000	
November 15	No. 20 Minnesota	Iowa Stadium; Iowa City, IA (rivalry)	W 13–7	50,000	
*Non-conference game; ^{†}Homecoming; Rankings from AP Poll released prior to the game
