= 1947 Purdue Boilermakers football team =

American college football season

1947 Purdue Boilermakers football
- Conference: Big Nine Conference
- Record: 5–4 (3–3 Big Nine)
- Head coach: Stu Holcomb (1st season)
- MVP: Phil O'Reilly
- Captain: Ned Maloney
- Home stadium: Ross–Ade Stadium

1947 Big Nine Conference football standings
| | Conf. | | | | | Overall |
| Team | W | | L | | T | W | | L | | T |
|---|---|---|---|---|---|---|---|---|---|---|
| No. 2 Michigan $ | 6 | – | 0 | – | 0 | 10 | – | 0 | – | 0 |
| Wisconsin | 3 | – | 2 | – | 1 | 5 | – | 3 | – | 1 |
| Minnesota | 3 | – | 3 | – | 0 | 6 | – | 3 | – | 0 |
| Illinois | 3 | – | 3 | – | 0 | 5 | – | 3 | – | 1 |
| Purdue | 3 | – | 3 | – | 0 | 5 | – | 4 | – | 0 |
| Indiana | 2 | – | 3 | – | 1 | 5 | – | 3 | – | 1 |
| Iowa | 2 | – | 3 | – | 1 | 3 | – | 5 | – | 1 |
| Northwestern | 2 | – | 4 | – | 0 | 3 | – | 6 | – | 0 |
| Ohio State | 1 | – | 4 | – | 1 | 2 | – | 6 | – | 1 |
$ – Conference champion; Rankings from AP Poll

The 1947 Purdue Boilermakers football team was an American football team that represented Purdue University during the 1947 Big Nine Conference football season. In their first season under head coach Stu Holcomb, the Boilermakers compiled a 5–4 record, finished in tie for fourth place in the Big Ten Conference with a 3–3 record against conference opponents, and outscored opponents by a total of 205 to 130.

Notable players from the 1947 Purdue team included halfback Harry Szulborski and tackle Phil O'Reilly.

Purdue was ranked at No. 18 (out of 500 college football teams) in the final Litkenhous Ratings for 1947.

== Schedule ==
| Date | Opponent | Rank | Site | Result | Attendance | Source |
|---|---|---|---|---|---|---|
| September 27 | at Wisconsin | | Camp Randall Stadium; Madison, WI | L 14–32 | 38,000 | |
| October 4 | Ohio State | | Ross–Ade Stadium; West Lafayette, IN | W 24–20 | 34,000 | |
| October 11 | No. 1 Notre Dame* | | Ross–Ade Stadium; West Lafayette, IN (rivalry) | L 7–22 | 42,000 | |
| October 18 | at Boston University* | | Fenway Park; Boston, MA | W 62–7 | 11,446 | |
| October 25 | No. 5 Illinois^{†} | | Ross–Ade Stadium; West Lafayette, IN (rivalry) | W 14–7 | 42,000 | |
| November 1 | Iowa | No. 16 | Ross–Ade Stadium; West Lafayette, IN | W 21–0 | 35,000 | |
| November 8 | at Minnesota | No. 14 | Memorial Stadium; Minneapolis, MN | L 21–26 | 63,659 | |
| November 15 | Pittsburgh* | | Ross–Ade Stadium; West Lafayette, IN | W 28–0 | 19,000 | |
| November 22 | at Indiana | | Memorial Stadium; Bloomington, IN (Old Oaken Bucket) | L 14–16 | 33,500 | |
*Non-conference game; ^{†}Homecoming; Rankings from AP Poll released prior to the game

== Rankings ==
Ranking movements Legend: ██ Increase in ranking ██ Decrease in ranking — = Not ranked
| | Week | | | | | | | | | |
| Poll | 1 | 2 | 3 | 4 | 5 | 6 | 7 | 8 | 9 | Final |
|---|---|---|---|---|---|---|---|---|---|---|
| AP | — | — | — | 16 | 14 | — | — | — | — | — |

== Games summaries ==
=== Ohio State ===
- Harry Szulborski 23 rushes, 172 yards

=== Boston University ===
- Harry Szulborski 17 rushes, 166 yards

=== Iowa ===
- Harry Szulborski 16 rushes, 134 yards

=== Minnesota ===
- Norbert Adams 24 rushes, 138 yards

=== Pittsburgh ===
- Harry Szulborski 15 rushes, 119 yards

== Roster ==
- Norbert Adams, HB
- Pete Barbolak, T
- Dick Bushnell, QB
- Dick Canfield, QB-HB
- Angelo Carnaghi, HB-C
- Bob DeMoss, QB
- Bill Feldkircher, QB
- Abe Gibron, G
- Ken Gorgal, QB
- Clyde Grimenstein, E
- Thomas Hard, G
- Arthur Haverstock, G
- Bob Heck, E
- Bill Horvath, G-E
- Lou Karras, T
- Don Lehmkuhl, G
- Ned Maloney, E
- Jack Milito, FB
- Bill Murray, G
- Phil O'Reilly, T
- George Papach, FB
- Fred Schimmelpfenig, HB
- Bill Sprang, C
- Raymond Stoelting, T
- Hank Stram, FB-HB
- Harry Szulborski, HB
