= 1947 Northwestern Wildcats football team =

American college football season

1947 Northwestern Wildcats football
- Conference: Big Nine Conference
- Record: 3–6 (2–4 Big Nine)
- Head coach: Bob Voigts (1st season)
- MVP: Art Murakowski
- Captain: Vince DiFrancesca
- Home stadium: Dyche Stadium

1947 Big Nine Conference football standings
| | Conf. | | | | | Overall |
| Team | W | | L | | T | W | | L | | T |
|---|---|---|---|---|---|---|---|---|---|---|
| No. 2 Michigan $ | 6 | – | 0 | – | 0 | 10 | – | 0 | – | 0 |
| Wisconsin | 3 | – | 2 | – | 1 | 5 | – | 3 | – | 1 |
| Minnesota | 3 | – | 3 | – | 0 | 6 | – | 3 | – | 0 |
| Illinois | 3 | – | 3 | – | 0 | 5 | – | 3 | – | 1 |
| Purdue | 3 | – | 3 | – | 0 | 5 | – | 4 | – | 0 |
| Indiana | 2 | – | 3 | – | 1 | 5 | – | 3 | – | 1 |
| Iowa | 2 | – | 3 | – | 1 | 3 | – | 5 | – | 1 |
| Northwestern | 2 | – | 4 | – | 0 | 3 | – | 6 | – | 0 |
| Ohio State | 1 | – | 4 | – | 1 | 2 | – | 6 | – | 1 |
$ – Conference champion; Rankings from AP Poll

The 1947 Northwestern Wildcats team was an American football team that represented Northwestern University during the 1947 Big Nine Conference football season. In its first year under head coach Bob Voigts, the team compiled a 3–6 record (2–4 against Big Nine Conference opponents), finished in eighth place in the Big Ten Conference, and outscored opponents by a total of 197 to 129.

No Northwestern players were named to the 1947 All-Big Nine Conference football teams.

Northwestern was ranked at No. 22 (out of 500 college football teams) in the final Litkenhous Ratings for 1947.

== Schedule ==
| Date | Opponent | Site | Result | Attendance | Source |
|---|---|---|---|---|---|
| September 27 | Vanderbilt* | Dyche Stadium; Evanston, IL | L 0–3 | 42,000 | |
| October 4 | UCLA* | Dyche Stadium; Evanston, IL | W 27–26 | 44,000 | |
| October 11 | at No. 17 Minnesota | Memorial Stadium; Minneapolis, MN | L 21–37 | 60,669 | |
| October 18 | No. 1 Michigan | Dyche Stadium; Evanston, IL (rivalry) | L 21–49 | 48,000 | |
| October 25 | Indiana^{†} | Dyche Stadium; Evanston, IL | W 7–6 | 42,000 | |
| November 1 | Wisconsin | Dyche Stadium; Evanston, IL | L 0–29 | 43,000 | |
| November 8 | at Ohio State | Ohio Stadium; Columbus, OH | L 6–7 | 70,203 | |
| November 15 | No. 1 Notre Dame* | Dyche Stadium; Evanston, IL (rivalry) | L 19–26 | 48,000 | |
| November 22 | at No. 12 Illinois | Memorial Stadium; Champaign, IL (rivalry) | W 28–13 | 52,158 | |
*Non-conference game; ^{†}Homecoming; Rankings from AP Poll released prior to the game
