= 1947 Michigan Wolverines football team =

American college football season

1947 Michigan Wolverines football

National champion (12 of 14 major selectors) Big Nine champion Rose Bowl champion

Rose Bowl, W 49–0 vs. USC
- Conference: Big Nine Conference

Ranking
- AP: No. 2 (No. 1 in special postseason poll)
- Record: 10–0 (6–0 Big Nine)
- Head coach: Fritz Crisler (10th season)
- Offensive scheme: Single-wing
- MVP: Bump Elliott
- Captain: Bruce Hilkene
- Home stadium: Michigan Stadium

1947 Big Nine Conference football standings
	Conf.					Overall
Team	W		L		T	W		L		T
No. 2 Michigan $	6	–	0	–	0	10	–	0	–	0
Wisconsin	3	–	2	–	1	5	–	3	–	1
Minnesota	3	–	3	–	0	6	–	3	–	0
Illinois	3	–	3	–	0	5	–	3	–	1
Purdue	3	–	3	–	0	5	–	4	–	0
Indiana	2	–	3	–	1	5	–	3	–	1
Iowa	2	–	3	–	1	3	–	5	–	1
Northwestern	2	–	4	–	0	3	–	6	–	0
Ohio State	1	–	4	–	1	2	–	6	–	1
$ – Conference champion; Rankings from AP Poll

The 1947 Michigan Wolverines football team represented the University of Michigan in the 1947 Big Nine Conference football season. In its tenth year under head coach Fritz Crisler, Michigan compiled a perfect 10–0 record, won the Big Ten Conference championship, and defeated the USC Trojans by a score of 49–0 in the 1948 Rose Bowl game. Although ranked second in the AP Poll at the end of the regular season, the Wolverines were selected as the nation's No. 1 team by a 226–119 margin over Notre Dame in an unprecedented AP Poll taken after the bowl games. The 1947 team outscored its opponents, 394–53, and has been selected as the best team in the history of Michigan football.

The 1947 Michigan Wolverines included five players who have been inducted into the College or Pro Football Halls of Fame: left halfback Bob Chappuis (who finished second in the 1947 Heisman Trophy voting), right halfback Bump Elliott (who received the Chicago Tribune trophy as the Big Ten MVP), defensive quarterback Pete Elliott, defensive end Len Ford, and tackle Al Wistert. Offensive tackle Bruce Hilkene was the team captain, and quarterback Howard Yerges was the field general who became known as "Crisler's 'second brain.'" Jack Weisenburger was the "spinning fullback" and the 1947 Big Ten rushing leader.

The 1947 Wolverines were the first team fully to embrace the concept of defensive and offensive specialization. Previously, most players had played their positions on both offense and defense. In 1947, Fritz Crisler established separate offensive and defensive squads. Only Bump Elliott and Jack Weisenberger played on both squads. In November 1947, Time magazine ran a feature article about the 1947 Wolverines focusing on the new era of specialization marked by Crisler's decision to field separate offensive and defensive units. The Time article noted: "Michigan's sleight-of-hand repertory is a baffling assortment of double reverses, buck-reverse laterals, crisscrosses, quick-hits and spins from seven different formations. Sometimes, watching from the side lines, even Coach Crisler isn't sure which Michigan man has the ball. Michigan plays one team on offense, one on defense...Whenever Michigan's defensive team regains the ball, Crisler orders: 'Offense unit, up and out,' and nine men pour onto the field at once." Crisler's single-wing formation in action was "so dazzling in its deception" that the media nicknamed the 1947 team the "Mad Magicians".

== Schedule ==
Date	Opponent	Rank	Site	TV	Result	Attendance
September 27	Michigan State*		Michigan Stadium; Ann Arbor, MI (rivalry)	WWJ-TV	W 55–0	72,015
October 4	Stanford*		Michigan Stadium; Ann Arbor, MI		W 49–13	66,779
October 11	Pittsburgh*	No. 2	Michigan Stadium; Ann Arbor, MI		W 69–0	60,085
October 18	at Northwestern	No. 1	Dyche Stadium; Evanston, IL (rivalry)		W 49–21	47,260
October 25	Minnesota^{†}	No. 1	Michigan Stadium; Ann Arbor, MI (Little Brown Jug)		W 13–6	85,938
November 1	at No. 11 Illinois	No. 2	Memorial Stadium; Champaign, IL (rivalry)		W 14–7	68,487
November 8	Indiana	No. 2	Michigan Stadium; Ann Arbor, MI		W 35–0	85,938
November 15	at Wisconsin	No. 2	Camp Randall Stadium; Madison, WI		W 40–6	42,335
November 22	Ohio State	No. 1	Michigan Stadium; Ann Arbor, MI (rivalry)		W 21–0	85,938
January 1, 1948	vs. No. 8 USC*	No. 2	Rose Bowl; Pasadena, CA (Rose Bowl)	KTLA	W 49–0	87,516
*Non-conference game; ^{†}Homecoming; Rankings from AP Poll released prior to the game

== Rankings ==
Ranking movements Legend: ██ Increase in ranking ██ Decrease in ranking ( ) = First-place votes
	Week									
Poll	1	2	3	4	5	6	7	8	9	Final
AP	2 (29)	1 (93)	1 (147)	2 (69)	2 (56)	2 (34)	1 (140)	2 (81)	2 (54½)	2 (25)

== Season summary ==
=== Pre-season ===
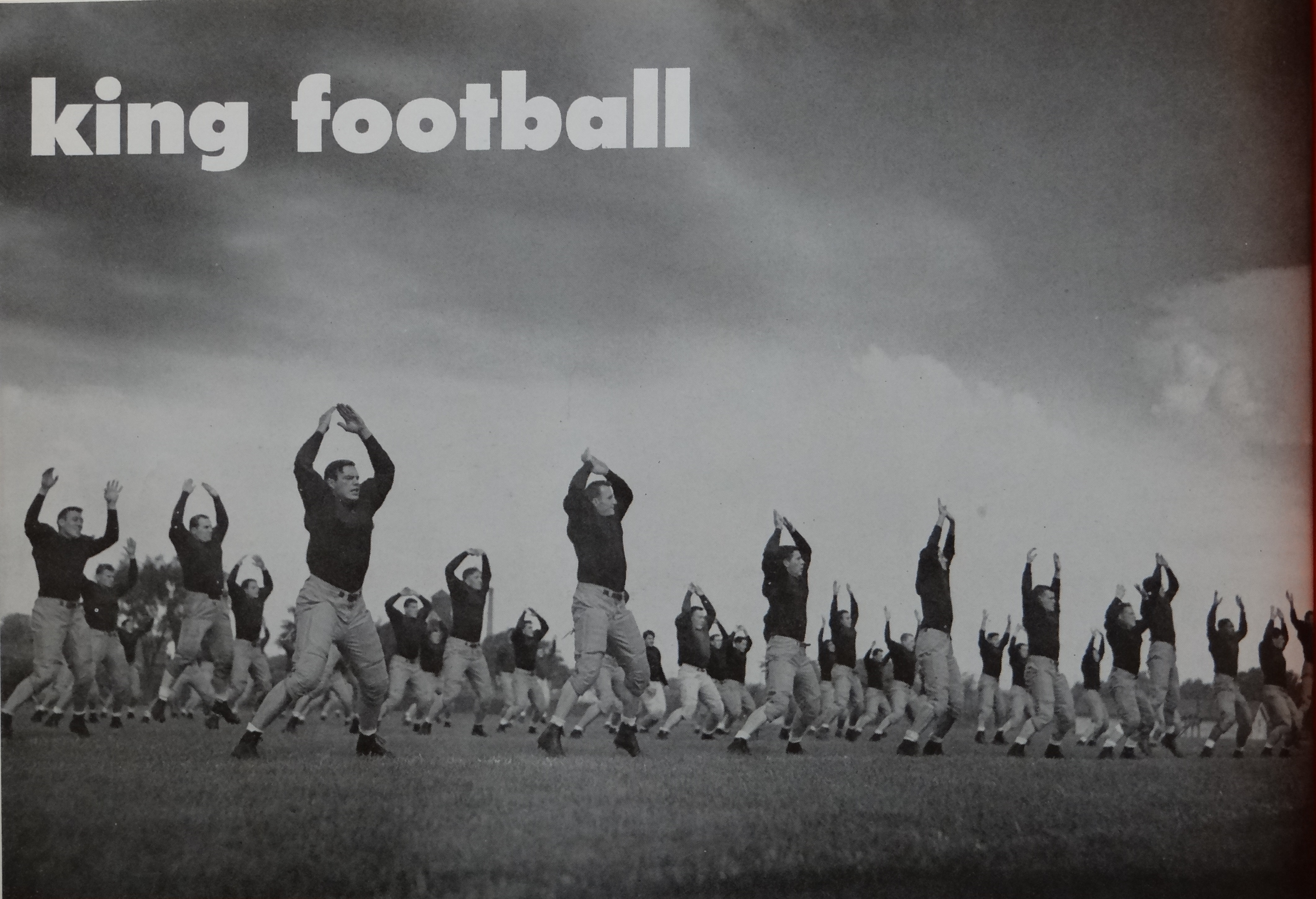
1947 Michigan team engaged in calisthenics

The 1946 Michigan football team compiled a record of 6–2–1 and closed the season with four consecutive wins over ranked opponents by a combined score of 162 to 19. In December 1946, lineman Bruce Hilkene was selected as the captain of the 1947 team. Hilkene had previously been selected as the captain of the 1945 team, but he was transferred as a Navy trainee and did not play for Michigan in 1945. Coming off a strong finish, the 1947 team featured a number of veterans from the 1946 squad. The returning veterans included halfback Bob Chappuis who set a Big Ten Conference record for total offense in 1946 and finished second in the voting for the Chicago Tribune Trophy as the Most Valuable Player in the Big Ten. Other returning starters included quarterback Howard Yerges, halfbacks Bump Elliott and Gene Derricotte, fullback Jack Weisenburger, ends Len Ford and Bob Mann, and linemen Hilkene, Bill Pritula, Quentin Sickels, Dominic Tomasi, and J. T. White. With a solid veteran core, the 1947 Wolverines were expected to be one of the best teams in the country.

=== Week 1: Michigan State ===
Week 1: Michigan State at Michigan

Team	1	2	3	4	Total
Mich. St.	0	0	0	0	0
• Michigan	14	14	20	7	55

- Date: September 27, 1947
- Location: Michigan Stadium
  Ann Arbor, Michigan
- Game attendance: 73,115
- Referee: Mike Layden

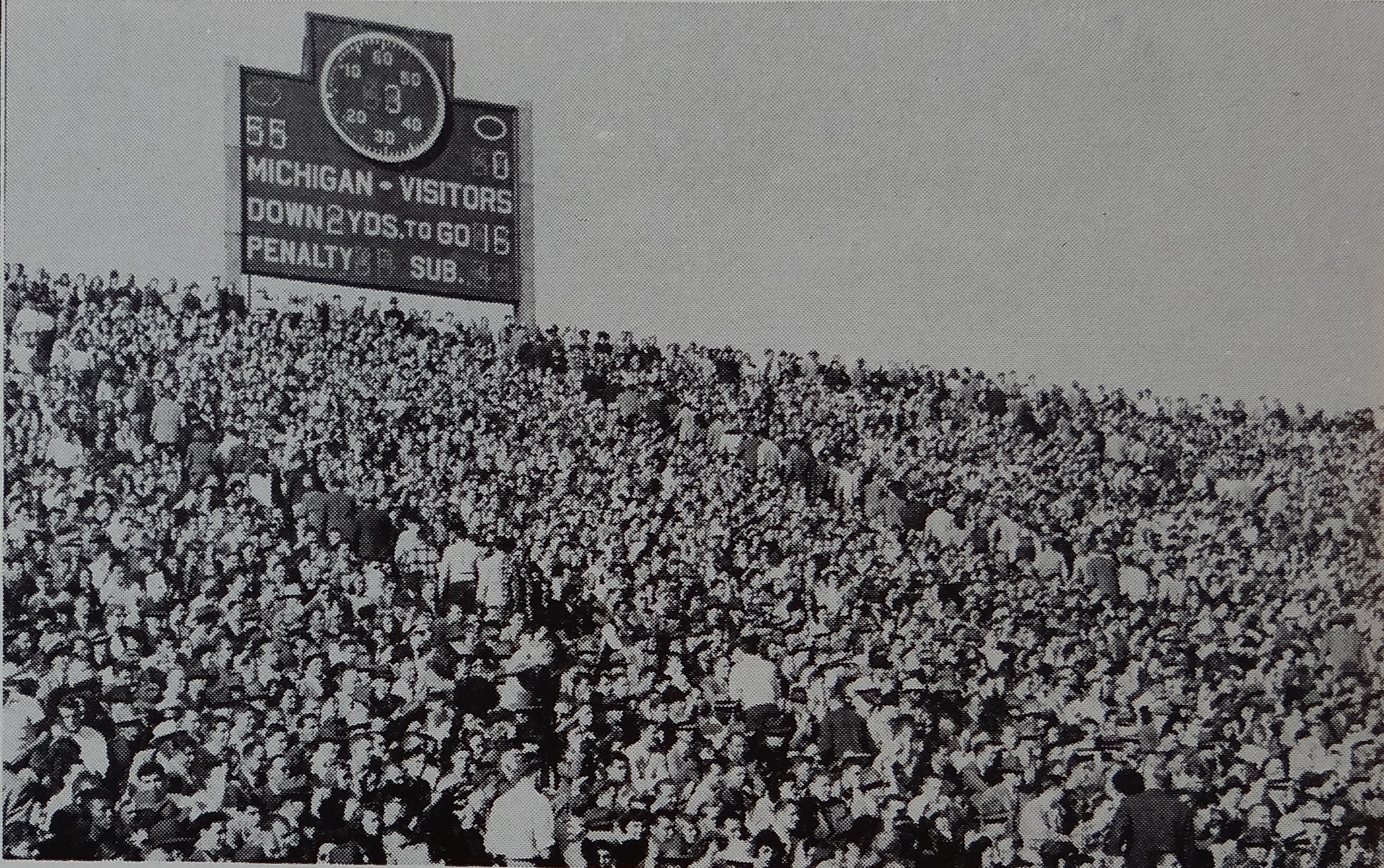
Scoreboard at Michigan Stadium reflects a 55–0 victory over Michigan State.

On September 27, 1947, Michigan opened the season with a non-conference game against Michigan State College. Playing in Ann Arbor in front of 73,115 spectators, the Wolverines defeated the Spartans, 55–0. The game was the first as head coach of the Spartans for Biggie Munn, who had been an assistant coach at Michigan from 1938 to 1945. Michigan dominated the game, outgaining Michigan State 504 yards to 56. Michigan head coach Fritz Crisler played second, third, and fourth string players later in the game, using 37 players in all. Bob Chappuis ran for three touchdowns and threw a touchdown pass for another. Jim Brieske made seven of eight point after touchdown (PAT) attempts in the game.

Michigan scored twice in the first quarter on touchdown runs by Jack Weisenburger and Chappuis. The second touchdown was set up by a 53-yard run by Bump Elliott. The Wolverines added two more touchdowns in the second quarter on short runs by Chappuis and Bump Elliott. Three more touchdowns followed in the third quarter, including a long touchdown pass from Chappuis to Len Ford with Ford running the last 35 yards after the catch. Center Dan Dworsky also scored on a 36-yard fumble return.

Michigan's starting lineup against Michigan State was Ford (left end), Hilkene (left tackle), Soboleski (right guard), Dworsky (center), Wilkins (right guard), Pritula (right tackle), McNeill (right end), Weisenburger (quarterback), Derricotte (left halfback), Bump Elliott (right halfback), and Kempthorn (fullback).

=== Week 2: Stanford ===
Week 2: Stanford at Michigan

Team	1	2	3	4	Total
Stanford	0	6	0	7	13
• Michigan	28	14	0	7	49

- Date: October 4, 1947
- Location: Michigan Stadium
  Ann Arbor, Michigan
- Game attendance: 66,100

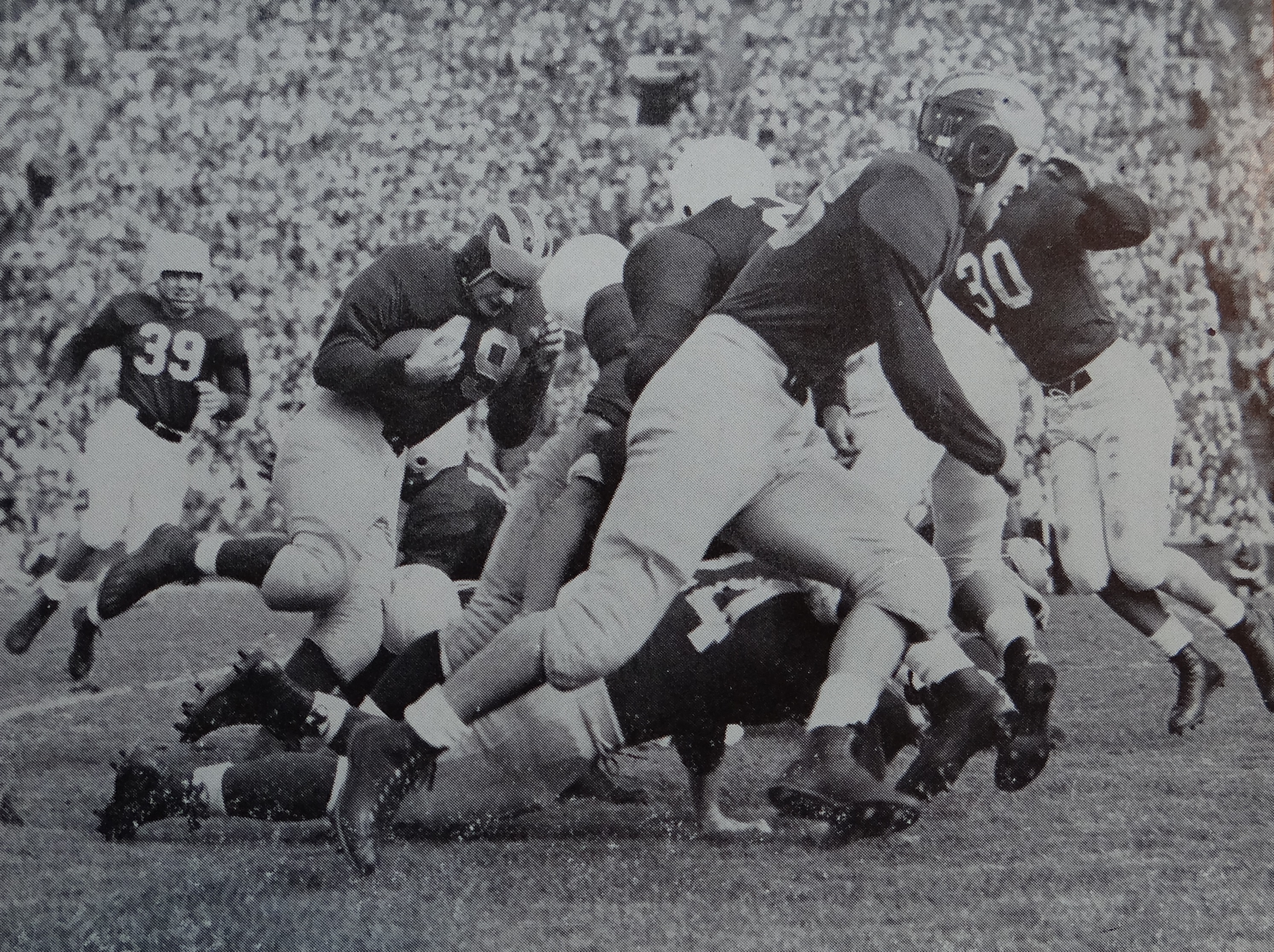
Weisenberger blocks for Chappuis against Stanford

In the second week of the season, Michigan hosted Stanford. The game was the first between the two schools since the 1902 Rose Bowl which Michigan won by a 49–0 margin. In the 1947 rematch, Michigan scored 28 points in the first quarter and won the game 49–13.

Michigan's starting lineup against Stanford was Mann (left end), Hilkene (left tackle), Soboleski (right guard), White (center), Wilkins (right guard), Pritula (right tackle), Rifenburg (right end), Yerges (quarterback), Chappuis (left halfback), Bump Elliott (right halfback), and Weisenburger (fullback).

=== Week 3: Pittsburgh ===
Week 3: Pittsburgh at Michigan

Team	1	2	3	4	Total
Pittsburgh	0	0	0	0	0
• Michigan	0	20	21	28	69

- Date: October 11, 1947
- Location: Michigan Stadium
  Ann Arbor, Michigan
- Game attendance: 60,085

In the third week of the season, Michigan hosted Pittsburgh. Michigan dominated the game, winning by a 69–0 score and outgaining the Panthers 496 yards to 69. One week earlier, Notre Dame had beaten Pitt by a score of 40–6. Pitt converted only one first down in the entire game. After the first quarter in Ann Arbor, the score was 0-0. Michigan's offense began to click in the second quarter with three touchdowns, followed by three more in the third quarter and four in the fourth quarter. The game's highlights included a 70-yard touchdown pass from Bob Chappuis to Bob Mann, a 40-yard interception return by Bump Elliott, an 80-yard punt return by Gene Derricotte. Michigan's ten touchdowns were scored by Mann (2), Derricotte, Jack Weisenburger, Bump Elliott, Don Kuick, Tom Peterson, and Len Ford. Jim Brieske converted 9 of 10 PAT attempts. In The New York Times, Walter W. Ruch wrote: "Angered by the fact that it had not been able to score in the first quarter, it 'poured it on.'"

Michigan's starting lineup against Pitt was Ford (left end), Wistert (left tackle), Soboleski (right guard), Dworsky (center), Sickels (right guard), Dendrinos (right tackle), McNeill (right end), Pete Elliott (quarterback), Derricotte (left halfback), Bump Elliott (right halfback), and Kempthorn (fullback).

=== Week 4: at Northwestern ===
Week 4: Michigan at Northwestern

Team	1	2	3	4	Total
• Michigan	14	14	21	0	49
Northwestern	7	0	0	14	21

- Date: October 18, 1947
- Location: Dyche Stadium
  Evanston, Illinois
- Game attendance: 47,260

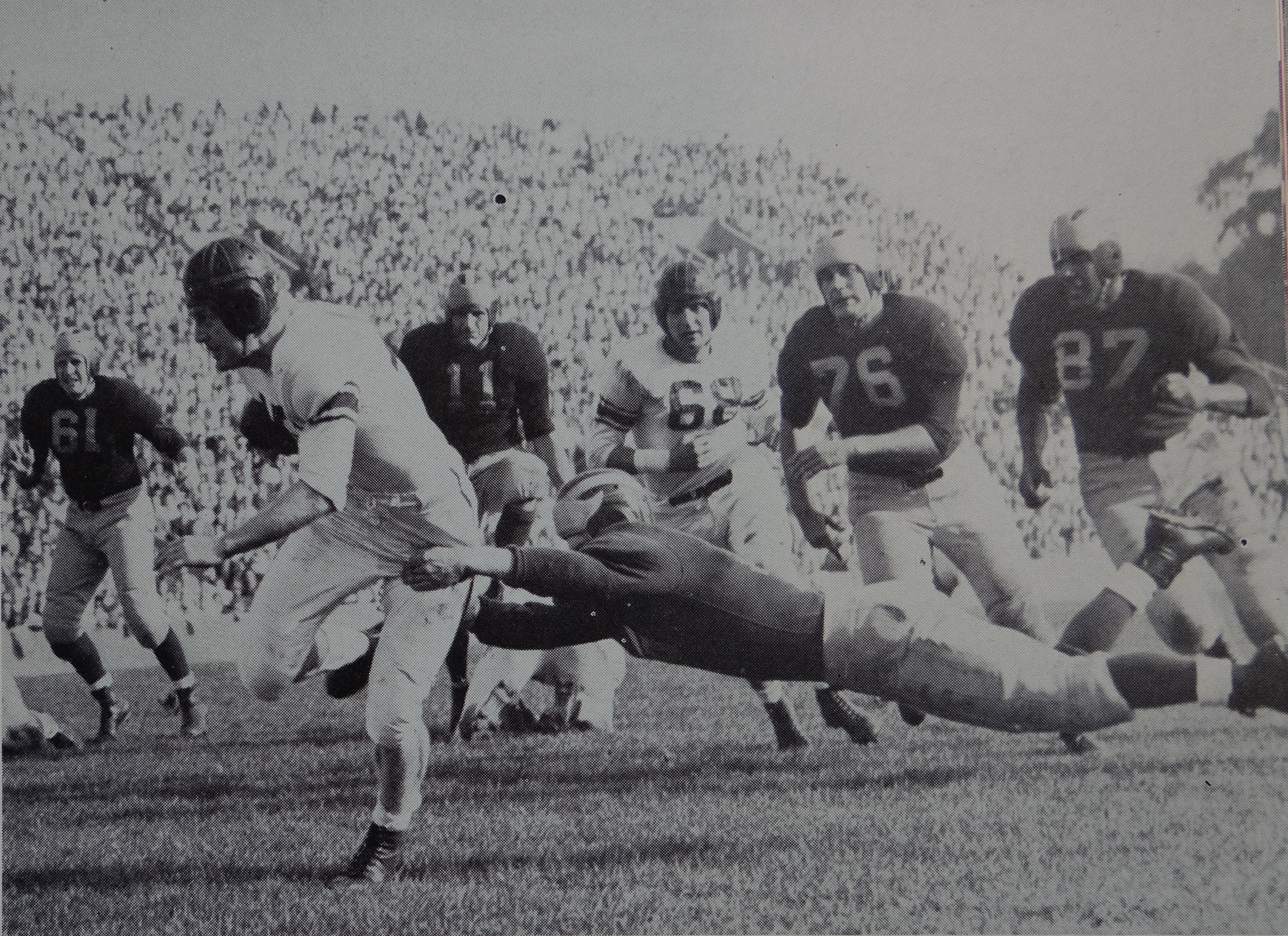
Bump Elliott "bums a ride" from Northwestern's Jules Slegel

On October 18, 1948, Michigan played its first road game against Northwestern at Dyche Stadium in Evanston, Illinois. Michigan jumped out to a 49–7 lead after three quarters. Playing against Michigan's third team, the Wildcats scored 14 points in the fourth quarter for a final score of 49–21. Highlights of the game included a 59-yard punt return by Gene Derricotte and a 52-yard touchdown run on an end around by Bob Mann. Michigan's seven touchdowns were scored by Jack Weisenburger (2), Bob Chappuis, Bump Elliott, Henry Fonde, Tom Peterson, and Mann. Jim Brieske converted all seven PATs for Michigan. After four games, Michigan had scored 222 points in 240 minutes, prompting comparisons to Michigan's "Point-a-Minute" teams of the early 1900s.

Michigan's starting lineup against Northwestern was Ford (left end), Wistert (left tackle), Soboleski (right guard), Dworsky (center), Sickels (right guard), Kohl (right tackle), McNeill (right end), Pete Elliott (quarterback), Derricotte (left halfback), Fonde (right halfback), and Peterson (fullback).

=== Week 5: Minnesota ===
Week 5: Minnesota at Michigan

Team	1	2	3	4	Total
Minnesota	0	6	0	0	6
• Michigan	0	7	0	6	13

- Date: October 25, 1947
- Location: Michigan Stadium
  Ann Arbor, Michigan
- Game attendance: 85,938

In the fifth week of the season, Michigan played its homecoming game against Minnesota. Michigan won a close game by a score of 13–6. Michigan scored first on a long touchdown pass from Bob Chappuis to Bump Elliott. The final touchdown in the fourth quarter followed a 24-yard interception return by Jack Weisenburger to the Minnesota 21-yard line. Gene Derricotte scored after faking to the right and then running through a hole on the left side and into the endzone. Chappuis was held to 26 rushing yards, less than two yards per carry. While Michigan won a close game over Minnesota, No. 2 Notre Dame defeated Iowa in South Bend, 21–0. In the AP Poll released after these games, Notre Dame passed Michigan to take the No. 1 ranking.

Michigan's starting lineup against Minnesota was Mann (left end), Hilkene (left tackle), Tomasi (right guard), White (center), Wilkins (right guard), Pritula (right tackle), Rifenburg (right end), Yerges (quarterback), Chappuis (left halfback), Bump Elliott (right halfback), and Weisenburger (fullback).

=== Week 6: at Illinois ===
Week 6: Michigan at Illinois

Team	1	2	3	4	Total
• Michigan	7	7	0	0	14
Illinois	0	7	0	0	7

- Date: November 1, 1947
- Location: Memorial Stadium
  Champaign, Illinois
- Game attendance: 71,119

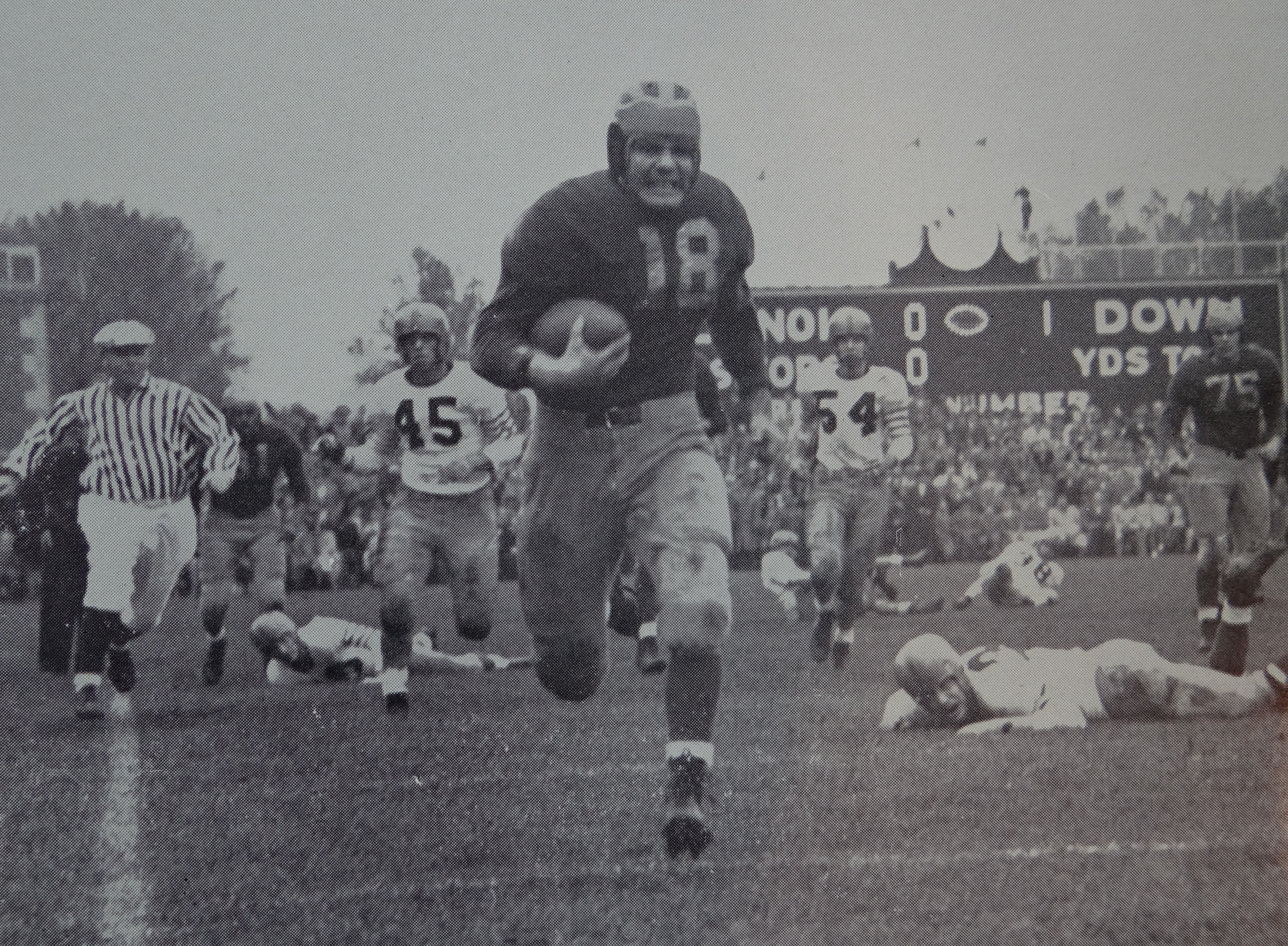
Bump Elliott runs 74 yards for a touchdown against Illinois.

In the sixth week of the season, Michigan traveled to Champaign, Illinois for Illinois' homecoming game. For the second straight week, Michigan won by a narrow margin 14–7. Late in the first quarter, Michigan took a 7–0 lead on a 74-yard punt return by Bump Elliott and a PAT by Jim Brieske. Illinois tied the game in the second quarter on a run by Russ Steger. Michigan's winning touchdown was set up by a 52-yard passing play from Bob Chappuis to Bump Elliott. Elliott was tackled the four-yard line, and Fonde ran for the touchdown. Brieske again converted the PAT. Neither team scored in the second half.

Michigan's starting lineup against Minnesota was Mann (left end), Hilkene (left tackle), Tomasi (right guard), White (center), Wilkins (right guard), Pritula (right tackle), Rifenburg (right end), Yerges (quarterback), Chappuis (left halfback), Bump Elliott (right halfback), and Weisenburger (fullback).

=== Week 7: Indiana ===
Week 7: Indiana at Michigan

Team	1	2	3	4	Total
Indiana	0	0	0	0	0
• Michigan	7	14	7	7	35

- Date: November 8, 1947
- Location: Michigan Stadium
  Ann Arbor, Michigan
- Game attendance: 85,938

In the sixth week of the season, Michigan regained its momentum and defeated Indiana 35–0 in Ann Arbor. In a game played amid intermittent snow flurries, highlights included a 61-yard run by Weisenburger in the second quarter and a 50-yard pass from Bob Chappuis to Dick Rifenburg in the fourth quarter. Michigan's five touchdowns were scored by Bump Elliott (2), Howard Yerges, Dick Rifenburg, and Henry Fonde. Notre Dame defeated Army, 27–7, and retained the No. 1 ranking in the AP Poll.

Michigan's starting lineup against Minnesota was Mann (left end), Hilkene (left tackle), Tomasi (right guard), White (center), Wilkins (right guard), Pritula (right tackle), Rifenburg (right end), Yerges (quarterback), Chappuis (left halfback), Bump Elliott (right halfback), and Weisenburger (fullback).

=== Week 8: at Wisconsin ===
Week 8: Michigan at Wisconsin

Team	1	2	3	4	Total
• Michigan	13	7	6	14	40
Wisconsin	0	6	0	0	6

- Date: November 8, 1947
- Location: Camp Randall Stadium
  Madison, Wisconsin
- Game attendance: 42,335

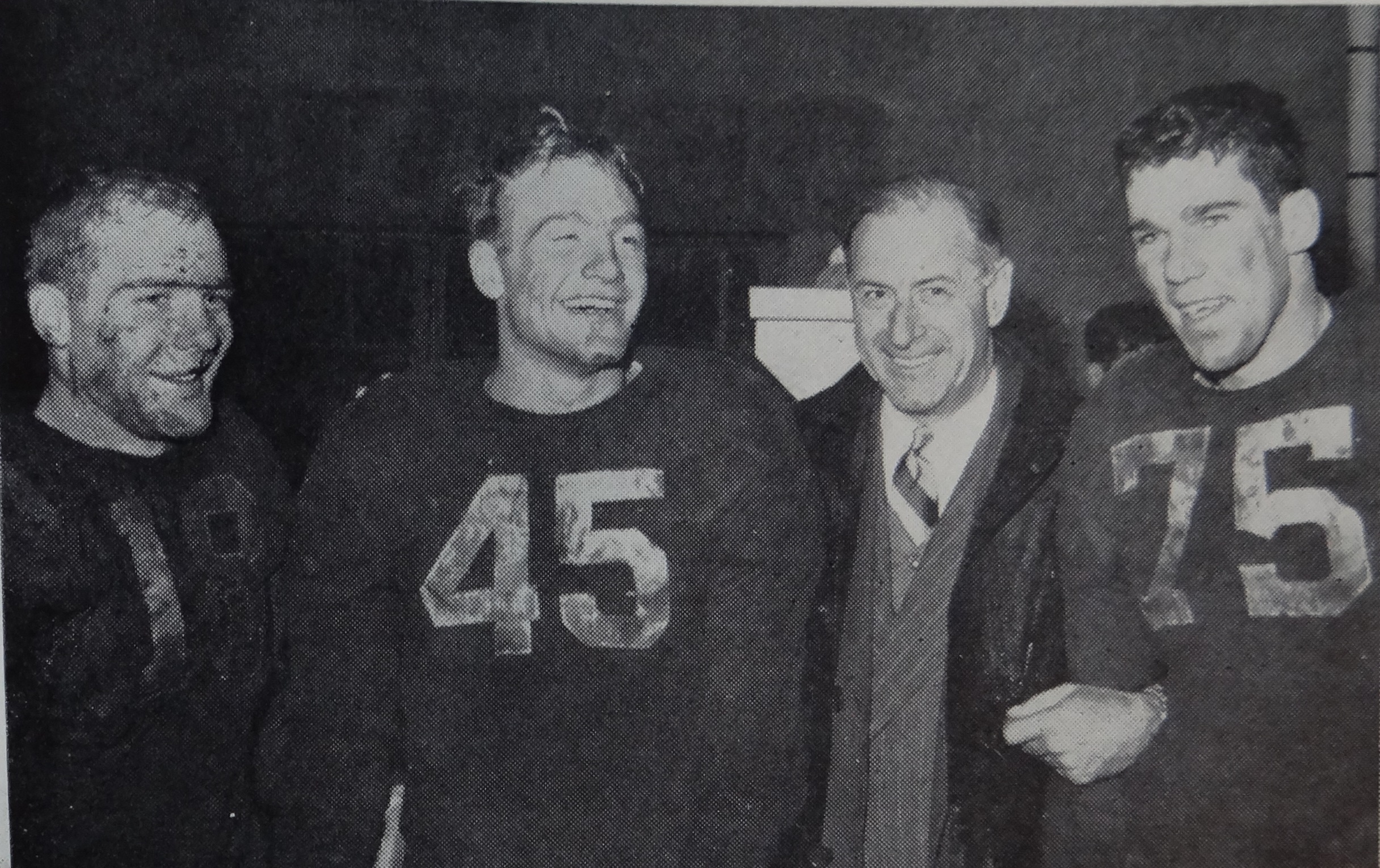
Elliott brothers, Crisler and Hilkene celebrate Big Nine championship in Wisconsin.

In the eighth week, Michigan traveled to Camp Randall Stadium in Madison, Wisconsin to play Wisconsin. Michigan won the game, 40–6, to clinch the Big Nine championship irrespective of the outcome of the following week's game against Ohio State. The game was played in cold, cloudy conditions amid rain and snow. Wisconsin came into the game on a four-game winning streak and "had been given a good chance to win." The New York Times wrote that Michigan's "overwhelming superiority" was too much for the Badgers as Bob Chappuis "threw passes long and short and sliced through the Wisconsin line with increasing effectiveness." Chappuis threw three touchdown passes, and Gene Derricotte returned a punt 77 yards for a touchdown. Michigan's six touchdowns were scored by Howard Yerges (2), Derricotte, Weisenburger, Rifenburg, and Tom Peterson. While Michigan defeated Wisconsin by 34 points, Notre Dame won a narrow victory against Northwestern, 26–19. After these games, Allison Danzig wrote:

"While Notre Dame was yielding as many touchdowns to Northwestern's intercepting Couriers as its six previous opponents combined had scored, the Maize and Blue was furnishing one of the season's finest offensive displays in rain, snow and mud. Against a Wisconsin eleven that had won first-ten rating, Bob Chappuis, Bump Elliott and associates executed Crisler's clever concepts of attack with a speed, power and finish in their running and passing operations that marked one of the campaign's high spots."

In the AP Poll following week eight, Michigan retook the No. 1 spot.

Michigan's starting lineup against Minnesota was Mann (left end), Hilkene (left tackle), Tomasi (right guard), White (center), Wilkins (right guard), Pritula (right tackle), Rifenburg (right end), Yerges (quarterback), Chappuis (left halfback), Bump Elliott (right halfback), and Kempthorn (fullback).

=== Week 9: Ohio State ===
Week 9: Ohio State at Michigan

Team	1	2	3	4	Total
Ohio State	0	0	0	0	0
• Michigan	7	0	7	7	21

- Date: November 22, 1947
- Location: Michigan Stadium
  Ann Arbor, Michigan
- Game attendance: 85,938

On November 22, 1947, Michigan concluded the regular season with a 21–0 win at home against rival Ohio State. Bump Elliott, Bob Chappuis, and Jack Weisenburger each ran for touchdowns, and Jim Brieske converted all three PATs. Late in the game, the fans at Michigan Stadium began chanting, "California, Here I Come." At the end of the game, Fritz Crisler was "streaming tears of joy as he walked off the field."

Michigan's starting lineup against Ohio State was Mann (left end), Hilkene (left tackle), Tomasi (right guard), White (center), Wilkins (right guard), Pritula (right tackle), Rifenburg (right end), Yerges (quarterback), Chappuis (left halfback), Bump Elliott (right halfback), and Weisenburger (fullback).

=== Final AP Poll ===
Despite the Wolverines' win over Ohio State, Notre Dame, after defeating Tulane 59–6, overtook Michigan in the AP Poll released on November 24, 1947. In a close vote, Notre Dame scored 1,798 points, and Michigan scored 1,768 points. Notre Dame's margin was reduced to eight points (1,184 points for Notre Dame, 1,176 points for Michigan) in the AP Poll released on December 2, 1947. On December 6, Notre Dame beat No. 3 USC, 38–7. In the final AP Poll released two days later, Notre Dame received 107 of 146 first place votes and edged Michigan by 1,410 points to 1,289. Although Michigan would defeat USC three weeks later by an even larger margin that Notre Dame, the final AP Poll in the late 1940s was taken at the end of the regular season and before any bowl games were played. At the time, Notre Dame did not participate in Bowl games. Accordingly, on December 10, 1947, the Dr. Henry L. Williams Trophy was presented to Notre Dame for finishing No. 1 in the final poll of the regular season.

=== Rose Bowl: USC ===
Rose Bowl: vs. USC

Team	1	2	3	4	Total
USC	0	0	0	0	0
• Michigan	7	14	7	21	49

- Date: January 1, 1948
- Location: Rose Bowl
  Pasadena, California
- Game attendance: 93,000

As the Big Nine Conference champions, Michigan played in the 1948 Rose Bowl against the University of Southern California. The game was Michigan's first appearance in a bowl game since its 49–0 victory over Stanford in the 1902 Rose Bowl. The 1947 team duplicated that score, defeating USC 49–0 in the 1948 Rose Bowl. The 49-point margin was the worst defeat in the history of the USC football program, and Michigan's 491 yards of total offense set a Rose Bowl record. The Wolverines threw four touchdown passes, and Jack Weisenburger ran for three touchdowns. Michigan completed 17 of 27 passes for 272 passing yards in the game.

On its second drive of the game, Michigan drove 63 yards for the game's first touchdown. The drive featured a 21-yard pass from Chappuis to Bump Elliott and a 17-yard gain to the nine-yard line on a pass from Chappuis to Dick Rifenburg. Weisenburger ran for the touchdown from the one-yard line, and Jim Brieske kicked the PAT. In the second quarter, Michigan increased its lead on a drive featuring a 23-yard gain to the 10-yard line on a pass from Chappuis to Gene Derricotte. Weisenburger again ran it in from the one-yard line with Brieske again kicking the PAT. Late in the second quarter, a 52-yard punt by Weisenburger pinned the Trojans inside their one-yard line. USC punted, giving Michigan good field position. They scored on a drive that featured a 27-yard gain on a pass from Chappuis to Bump Elliott and a 16-yard run by Chappuis, and concluded with an 11-yard jump pass from Chappuis to Elliott. Brieske converted his third PAT, and Michigan led 21–0 at halftime.

In the third quarter, Michigan added to its lead on 18-yard touchdown pass in which Chappuis rolled out to his right and threw across the field to quarterback Howard Yerges, who was open at the nine-yard line. Yerges caught the ball and ran it in for a touchdown, giving Michigan a 28–0 lead. The Wolverines closed the game with three touchdowns in the fourth quarter. The touchdowns came on a one-yard run by Weisenberger, a 46-yard pass from Henry Fonde to Derricotte who was open at the 25-yard line and ran untouched down the right sideline, and a 29-yard pass from Yerges to Rifenburg. Brieske converted all seven PATs for Michigan.

Michigan's starting lineup in the Rose Bowl was Mann (left end), Hilkene (left tackle), Tomasi (right guard), White (center), Wilkins (right guard), Pritula (right tackle), Rifenburg (right end), Yerges (quarterback), Chappuis (left halfback), Bump Elliott (right halfback), and Weisenburger (fullback).

== National championship controversy ==
=== Response to Michigan's Rose Bowl win ===
After the final AP Poll, Michigan went on to beat USC in the 1948 Rose Bowl, a greater margin that by which Notre Dame had beaten USC (38–7). Michigan's 49–0 victory was the largest margin of victory ever against a USC team and the most points scored in Rose Bowl history. Football writer Pete Rozelle reported on the reaction of the assembled writers in the Rose Bowl press box. "From Grantland Rice down through the ranks of the nation's top sports writers assembled in the Rose Bowl press box yesterday there was nothing but glowing expletives for the synchronized Michigan Wolverine wrecking crew that powered over Southern California, 49-0. While for the most part hedging from a comparison of Michigan with Notre Dame, the consensus of the scribes was that the offensive-minded Ann Arbor squad deserved no less than a co-rating with the Irish as America's Number One Collegiate eleven." Grantland Rice, the dean of the nation's sports writers, wrote of Michigan: "It is the best all-around college football team I've seen this year. The backfield's brilliant passing and running skill gives Michigan the most powerful offense in the country." Red Smith of the New York Herald Tribune said, "No other team that I have seen this season did things with so little effort. Crisler has so many that do so much."

=== Debate over which team was best ===
Notre Dame supporters argued that the post-season AP poll was final and should not be revisited. They contended that Michigan had run up the score on USC, noted that Notre Dame had not had an opportunity to play in a bowl game, and asserted that Michigan and other Big Nine schools were unwilling to schedule Notre Dame in the regular season.

Detroit Free Press sports editor, Lyall Smith, argued the debate should be answered by comparing the two team's performance against common opponents. Smith noted: "They played three common foes. Notre Dame beat Pitt, 40–6, a margin of 34 points: Michigan beat Pitt 59–0. Notre Dame defeated Northwestern, 26 to 19, a margin of seven points: Michigan beat the 'Cats 49 to 21, for a 28-point advantage. Notre Dame dropped USC, 36 to 7, in what Coach Frank Leahy termed his team's 'greatest game of the year,' while Michigan slaughtered the same Trojans, 49 to 0. Against those three common opponents the Irish scored 104 points to 32. Michigan's margin was 167 to 21." Smith also pointed to Michigan's strength of schedule: "The teams Michigan played won 42 games, lost 48 and tied five. Notre Dame's adversaries won only 30, lost 45, and tied 6."

=== Special post-bowl AP poll ===
In response to the debate over which team deserved to be recognized as the nation's best, the Associated Press decided to hold a post-bowl poll. The AP reported on the rationale for the special poll this way: "The Associated Press is polling sports editors of its member papers throughout the country to help settle the argument as to which is the better football team – Michigan or Notre Dame. The AP's final poll of the top ten teams, released December 8 at the conclusion of the regulation season, resulted in Notre Dame winning first place with 1,410 points. Michigan was second with 1,289... Returns so far received indicate that voting in this latest poll is likely to be the heaviest ever recorded." Another AP report indicated the special poll was "conducted by popular demand" to answer "the burning sports question of the day" and to do so "at the ballot box."

Michigan was voted No. 1 in the post-bowl poll by a vote of 226 to 119. The AP reported: "The nation's sports writers gave the final answer Tuesday to the raging controversy on the relative strength of the Notre Dame and Michigan football teams, and it was the Wolverines over the Irish by almost two to one—including those who saw both powerhouses perform... In the over-all total, 226 writers in 48 states and the District of Columbia picked Michigan, 119 balloted for Notre Dame, and 12 called it a draw. Opinion of the 54 writers who saw both in action last fall coincided at almost the same ratio, with 33 giving the nod to Michigan, 17 to Notre Dame, and four voting for a tie." The 357 votes cast in the post-bowl poll represented "the largest ever to take part in such an AP voting."

Commenting on the special poll, Michigan coach Fritz Crisler said "the men who voted couldn't have made a mistake if they had picked either team." He described Notre Dame coach Frank Leahy as a "superb coach." Notre Dame President, Father John Cavanagh said, "We at Notre Dame feel grateful for the magnanimous statement of Coach Crisler. I listened to Michigan against Southern California and have only praise for the skill and accomplishment of your fine team."

Despite the magnanimous statements of Coach Crisler and Father Cavanagh, the reversed decision in the post-bowl poll only stoked the debate over which team was best. Said one columnist: "Hottest argument of the moment is the one over which had the better football team, Michigan or Notre Dame." Forty years later, the debate was still ongoing. In 1988, Michigan center Dan Dworsky noted: "Notre Dame still claims that national championship and so do we."

== Players ==
=== Varsity letter winners ===
On January 5, 1948, head coach Fritz Crisler announced that he had awarded varsity letters to 35 members of the 1947 football team. The 35 letter winners were:

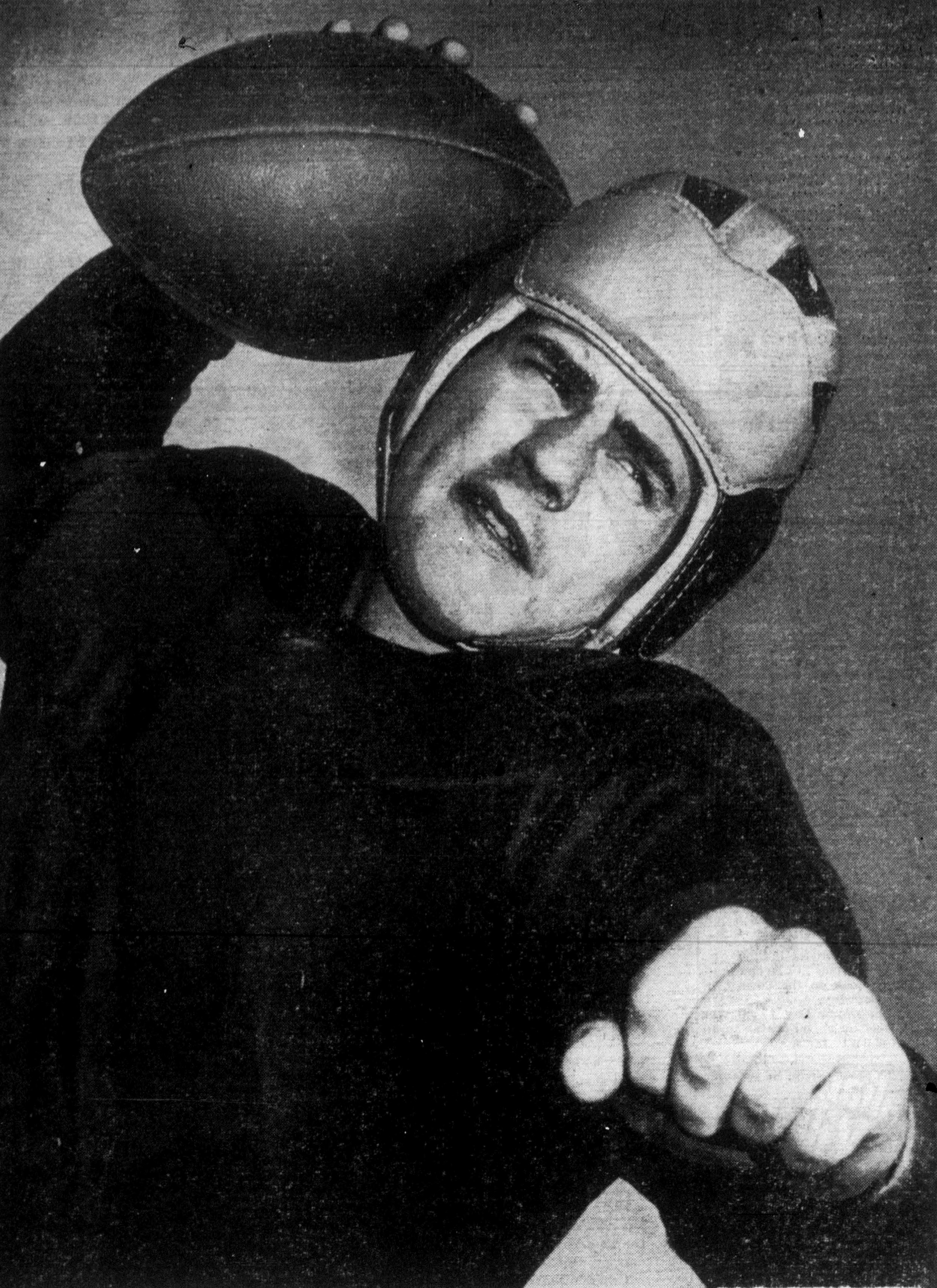
Bob Chappuis

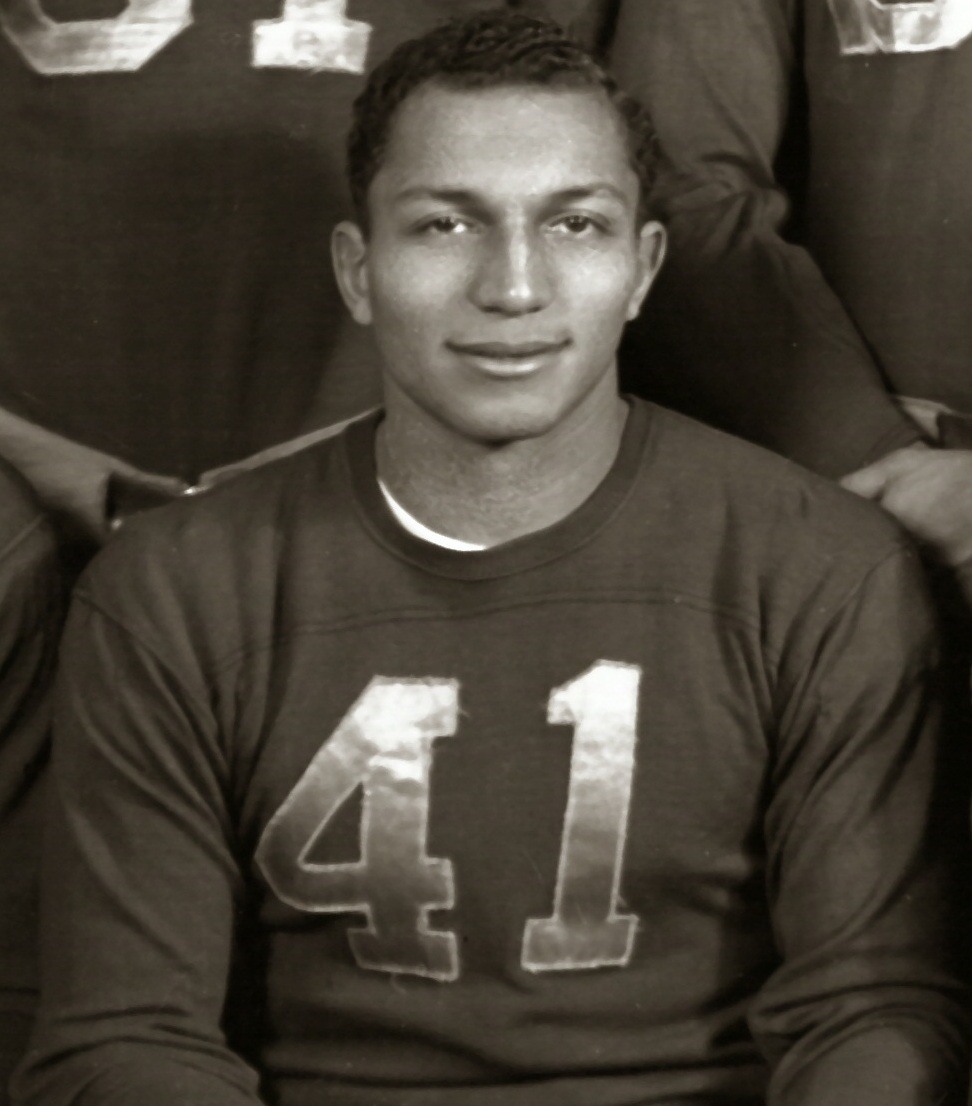
Gene Derricotte

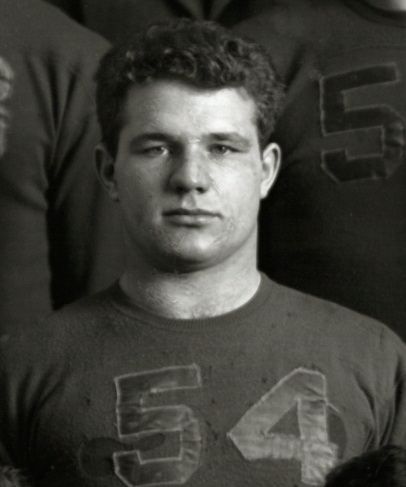
Bill Pritula

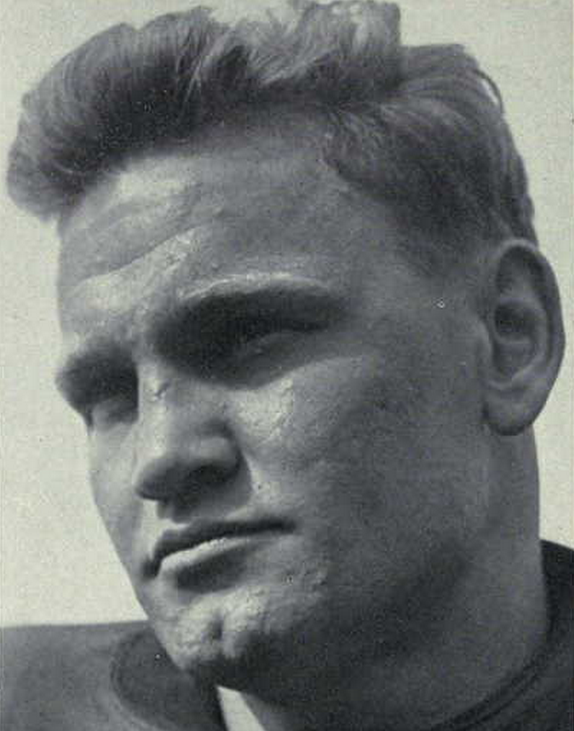
Dick Kempthorn

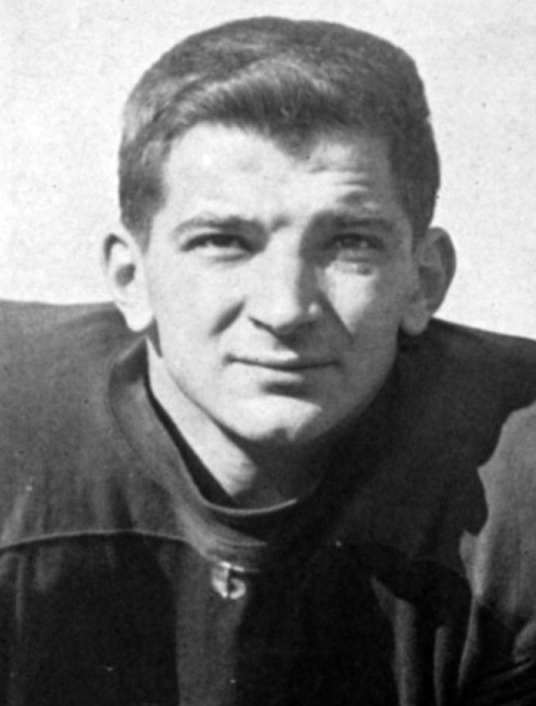
John Ghindia

- Jim Brieske – placekicker, and started 1 game at center
- Bob Chappuis – left halfback (9 games)
- Pete Dendrinos – tackle
- Gene Derricotte – quarterback (1 game)
- Dan Dworsky – fullback (1 game), center (1 game)
- Bump Elliott – right halfback (10 games)
- Pete Elliott – quarterback
- Henry Fonde – halfback
- Len Ford – left end (1 game)
- Lloyd Heneveld – guard
- Don Hershberger – end
- Bruce Hilkene – left tackle (8 games)
- Robert Hollway – end
- George Johnson – tackle
- Kurt Kampe Jr. guard
- Dick Kempthorn – fullback (1 game)
- George Kiesel – quarterback
- Ralph Kohl – right tackle (1 game)
- Don Kuick – halfback
- Bob Mann – left end (8 games)
- Don McClelland – guard
- Ed McNeill – left end (1 game), right end (1 game)
- Tom Peterson – fullback (1 game)
- Bill Pritula – right tackle (9 games)
- Dick Rifenburg – right end (9 games)
- Quentin Sickels – right guard (1 game)
- Joe Soboleski – left guard (3 games)
- Wally Teninga – halfback
- Dominic Tomasi – left guard (7 games)
- J. T. White – center (8 games)
- Jack Weisenburger – fullback (7 games), left halfback (1 game)
- Stu Wilkins – right guard (9 games)
- Irv Wisniewski – end
- Alvin Wistert – left tackle (2 games)
- Howard Yerges – quarterback (started 9 games)

=== Reserves ===
- John M. Andersen – end
- James L. Atchison – tackle
- Robert M. Ballou – tackle
- Richards S. Brown – end
- John D. Combes – halfback
- John Eizonas – tackle
- Bob Erben – center
- Alan Fitch – guard
- Daniel Frank -
- John Ghindia – quarterback
- David L. Gomberg – tackle
- Norman E. Jackson – tackle
- Donald A. Jones
- John J. Kulpinski – center
- Conrad B. Kuzma -halfback
- Charlie Lentz – halfback
- John C. Linville – guard
- Hugh R. Mack – quarterback
- John E. Maturo – guard
- James Morrish – halfback
- Frank Nakamura – guard
- Donald Nichols – center
- Alton Noble – halfback
- John Padjen Jr. – guard
- James H. Poppy – tackle
- Prentice Ryan – halfback
- Ralph Salucci – guard
- Irwin Small – quarterback
- Kenneth L. Smith
- Richard Strauss – tackle
- Robert E. Twining – tackle
- Kenneth J. Varrige – guard
- Edward W. Wedge
- John H. Wilcox – halfback

== Individual awards and honors ==
- Captain: Bruce Hilkene
- 1947 All-Americans: Bob Chappuis (first-team All-American on teams selected by the Associated Press, United Press, Saturday Evening Post, Collier's Weekly, the Walter Camp Football Foundation, the Football Writers Association of America, and the Central Press, NEA and INS wire services); Bump Elliott (first-team All-American on the Saturday Evening Post team; second-team on teams selected by the Associated Press, the United Press, the Central Press, and the Football Writers Association of America); Len Ford (second-team All-American on teams selected by the United Press and Central Press); Bob Mann (second-team All-American on the team selected by the Associated Press); J. T. White (second-team All-American on the team selected by the Football Writers Association of America).
- All-Conference: Bob Mann, Howard Yerges, Bob Chappuis, Bump Elliott
- Most Valuable Player: Bump Elliott
- Meyer Morton Award: Alvin Wistert
- Heisman Trophy voting: Bob Chappuis finished 2nd in the Heisman voting behind Johnny Lujack. Lujack had 742 points, and Chappuis had 555.
- College Football Hall of Fame: Bob Chappuis, Bump Elliott, Al Wistert

== Coaching staff ==
- Head coach: Fritz Crisler
- Assistant coaches: Jack Blott (head line coach), George Ceithaml, Forrest Jordan (assistant line coach), Clifford Keen, Ernest McCoy (chief scout), Bennie Oosterbaan (backfield coach), Arthur Valpey (end coach), Walter Weber (freshman coach)
- Trainer: Jim Hunt
- Manager: E. Kirk McKinney Jr.
