= Bill Pritula =

American football player (1922–2006)

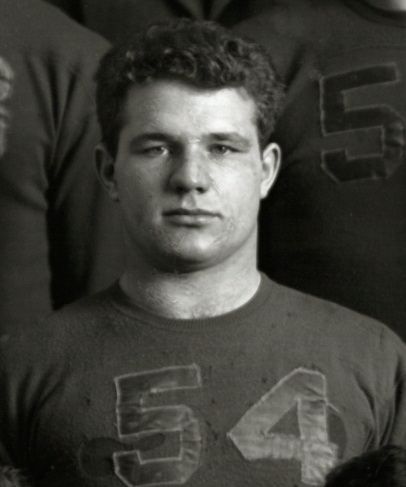

Profile
- Position: Tackle

Personal information
- Born: March 10, 1922; Pittsburgh, Pennsylvania, U.S.
- Died: January 24, 2006 (aged 83); Ann Arbor, Michigan, U.S.

Career information
- College: Michigan

Career history
- 1941–1942, 1946–1947: Michigan

Awards and highlights
- First-team All-Big Nine (1947)

William Pritula (March 10, 1922 – January 24, 2006) was an American football player. He played college football as the starting right tackle for Fritz Crisler's Michigan Wolverines football teams in 1942, 1946, and 1947. He was one of Michigan's "Seven Oak Posts" line in 1942, made famous for their durability and two-way playing, and was also a key blocker for the 1947 offensive unit known as the "Mad Magicians."

Pritula was born in 1922 at Pittsburgh, Pennsylvania, but moved with his parents to Detroit as a child. His father, Ivan Prytula, immigrated from Austrian-Hungarian Empire in 1911. Pritula attended Chadsey High School in Detroit. He enrolled at the University of Michigan and played at the right tackle position for the Michigan Wolverines football team from 1941–1942 and 1946–1947. After serving as a backup center in 1941, Pritula started all ten games at right tackle for the 1942 team. With the roster depleted due to the war, Pritula was one of several 60-minute men on the 1942 team who played all ten games with little or no substitution. Michigan's 1942 line, which included Pritula, Julius Franks, Elmer Madar, Merv Pregulman, Albert Wistert, and Robert Kolesar, became known as the "Seven Oak Posts. Pritula was the last of the "Seven Oak Posts" to play at Michigan.

Pritula missed three years at Michigan while serving in the U.S. Army Air Corps engineers during World War II. His service included 18 months in New Guinea and the Philippines. He returned to Michigan in 1946 and resumed his position as the Wolverines starting right tackle. As a senior, he started nine of ten games at right tackle for the undefeated 1947 Michigan Wolverines football team. His final game for Michigan was the 1948 Rose Bowl in which Michigan defeated the USC Trojans, 49-0. During his three years as a starter at Michigan, the team compiled a record of 23-5-1 and were ranked No. 9, No. 6 and No. 1 in the AP Polls. He was selected by the Associated Press as a second-team All-Big Nine Conference player in 1947. He was also invited to play in the 1948 Chicago College All-Star Game against the Chicago Cardinals. Pritula was a member of Kappa Sigma fraternity and Tau Beta Pi national engineering society at Michigan.

In June 1948, Pritula was hired as the line coach at Morningside College in Sioux City, Iowa. After three years at Morningside, he was hired in 1951 as the line coach on Dutch Clark's staff at the University of Detroit.

Pritula was married in 1942 to Irene Szabla. They had five children: Joyce, Karen, William, Carrie, and Michael.

In 1952, Pritula joined General Motors as an engineer. He worked for GM's Hydra-Matic Division at Willow Run for 27 years. He received a master of arts degree from Michigan in 1967. He died in January 2006 in Ann Arbor.
