= 1947 Ohio State Buckeyes football team =

American college football season

1947 Ohio State Buckeyes football
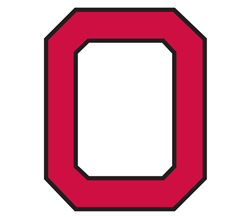
- Conference: Big Nine Conference
- Record: 2–6–1 (1–4–1 Big Nine)
- Head coach: Wes Fesler (1st season)
- MVP: Dave Templeton
- Home stadium: Ohio Stadium

1947 Big Nine Conference football standings
	Conf.					Overall
Team	W		L		T	W		L		T
No. 2 Michigan $	6	–	0	–	0	10	–	0	–	0
Wisconsin	3	–	2	–	1	5	–	3	–	1
Minnesota	3	–	3	–	0	6	–	3	–	0
Illinois	3	–	3	–	0	5	–	3	–	1
Purdue	3	–	3	–	0	5	–	4	–	0
Indiana	2	–	3	–	1	5	–	3	–	1
Iowa	2	–	3	–	1	3	–	5	–	1
Northwestern	2	–	4	–	0	3	–	6	–	0
Ohio State	1	–	4	–	1	2	–	6	–	1
$ – Conference champion; Rankings from AP Poll

The 1947 Ohio State Buckeyes football team was an American football team that represented Ohio State University in the 1947 Big Nine Conference football season. In its first season under head coach Wes Fesler, the team compiled a 2–6–1 record (1–4–1 against conference opponents), finished last in the Big Nine, and was outscored by a total of 150 to 60.

Key players included Ollie Cline and Joe Whisler.

Ohio State was ranked at No. 35 (out of 500 college football teams) in the final Litkenhous Ratings for 1947.

== Schedule ==
Date	Opponent	Site	Result	Attendance	Source
September 27	Missouri*	Ohio Stadium; Columbus, OH	W 13–7	59,444	
October 4	at Purdue	Ross–Ade Stadium; West Lafayette, IN	L 20–24	34,000	
October 11	No. 20 USC*	Ohio Stadium; Columbus, OH	L 0–32	76,559	
October 18	Iowa	Ohio Stadium; Columbus, OH	T 13–13	72,998	
October 25	at Pittsburgh*	Pitt Stadium; Pittsburgh, PA	L 0–12	55,217	
November 1	Indiana	Ohio Stadium; Columbus, OH	L 0–7	75,882	
November 8	Northwestern	Ohio Stadium; Columbus, OH	W 7–6	70,203	
November 15	No. 11 Illinois	Ohio Stadium; Columbus, OH (Illibuck)	L 7–28	70,036	
November 22	at No. 1 Michigan	Michigan Stadium; Ann Arbor, MI (rivalry)	L 0–21	85,938	
*Non-conference game; Rankings from AP Poll released prior to the game

== Coaching staff ==
- Wes Fesler, head coach, first year

== 1948 NFL draftees ==
Five Ohio State players were selected in the 1948 NFL draft, as follows:

Player	Round	Pick	Position	NFL club
Howard Duncan	6	42	Center	Philadelphia Eagles
Bob Brugge	6	44	Back	Chicago Bears
Dick Flanagan	10	83	Linebacker	Chicago Bears
Ollie Cline	14	122	Fullback	Chicago Bears
Dave Templeton	16	137	Guard	Detroit Lions
