= Lou Mihajlovich =

American football player (1925–1994)

No. 54, 41
- Positions: End; Defensive end

Personal information
- Born: February 19, 1925; Detroit, Michigan, U.S.
- Died: December 11, 1994 (aged 69)
- Listed height: 5 ft 11 in (1.80 m)
- Listed weight: 175 lb (79 kg)

Career information
- High school: James Whitcomb Riley (Indiana)
- College: Indiana

Career history
- Los Angeles Dons (1948); Green Bay Packers (1954)

Awards and highlights
- Second-team All-Big Nine (1947)

Career statistics
- Games played: 12
- Receptions: 4
- Receiving yards: 42
- Stats at Pro Football Reference

Louis Mihajlovich (February 19, 1925 – December 11, 1994) was a defensive end in the National Football League (NFL).

== Biography ==
Mihajlovich was born on February 19, 1925, in Detroit, Michigan.

== Career ==
Mihajlovich's first professional experience was with the Los Angeles Dons of the All-America Football Conference. Later he played with the Green Bay Packers during the 1954 NFL season.

He played at the collegiate level at Indiana University.
