= Ike Owens (American football) =

American football player (1920–1980)

Illinois Fighting Illini
- Positions: End, defensive end

Personal information
- Born: January 8, 1920; Columbus, Georgia, U.S.
- Died: June 14, 1980 (aged 60); Gary, Indiana, U.S.
- Listed height: 6 ft 1 in (1.85 m)
- Listed weight: 190 lb (86 kg)

Career information
- High school: Theodore Roosevelt (Gary, Indiana)
- College: Illinois (1941, 1946–1947)

Awards and highlights
- Second-team All-American (1947); 2× First-team All-Big Nine (1946, 1947)

Isiah Hudson Owens (January 8, 1920 – June 14, 1980) was an American football player.

Owens was born in Columbus, Georgia, in 1920. He moved to Gary, Indiana, as a boy and attended Theodore Roosevelt High School in that city. Owens enrolled at the University of Illinois in 1940, but his college career was interrupted by four years of service in the Air Corps during World War II.

After the war, Owens returned to the University of Illinois where he became one of the school's first African-American football stars. He played for the Illinois Fighting Illini football team in 1941, 1946, and 1947. Illinois coach Ray Eliot called him one of "the greatest ends in Illinois football history." He received numerous honors during his playing career at Illinois, including the following:

- In 1946, he was selected by the United Press (UP) as a first-team player on the 1946 All-Big Nine Conference football team.
- He was selected by his teammates as the most valuable player on the 1947 Illinois Fighting Illini football team.
- He was selected by the Associated Press (AP), UP, and International News Service (INS) as a first-team end on the 1947 All-Big Nine Conference football team.
- Owens also received second-team honors from the AP, INS, and Newspaper Enterprise Association on the 1947 College Football All-America Team.

Owens graduated from Illinois in June 1948 as an honor student with a degree in art and design.

In June 1948, Owens signed to play for the Chicago Rockets of the All-America Football Conference. Owens appeared in eight games as a defensive end for the Rockets in 1948. He was released in late October 1948. He died in June 1980 at the age of 60.
