= 1947 All-Big Nine Conference football team =

College football honors

The 1947 All-Big Nine Conference football team consists of American football players selected to the All-Big Nine Conference teams selected by the Associated Press (AP), United Press (UP) and the International News Service (INS) for the 1947 Big Nine Conference football season. The top vote getters in the AP voting by conference coaches were Leo Nomellini, Bob Chappuis, and Bump Elliott, each receiving 16 of 18 possible points.

== All Big-Ten selections ==
=== Ends ===
- Bob Mann, Michigan (AP-1, INS-1, UP-1)
- Ike Owens, Illinois (AP-1, INS-1, UP-1)
- Len Ford, Michigan (AP-2, INS-2, UP-2)
- Lou Mihajlovich, Indiana (AP-2, INS-2)

=== Tackles ===
- Phil O'Reilly, Purdue (AP-1, INS-1, UP-1)
- Lou Agase, Illinois (AP-1, INS-1)
- Bill Pritula, Michigan (AP-2, INS-2, UP-1)
- Dean Widseth, Minnesota (AP-2, INS-2)

=== Guards ===
- Howie Brown, Indiana (AP-1, INS-1, UP-1)
- Leo Nomellini, Minnesota (AP-1, INS-1, UP-1)
- Dominic Tomasi, Michigan (AP-2, INS-2)
- John Wrenn, Illinois (AP-2, INS-2)

=== Centers ===
- Red Wilson, Wisconsin (AP-1, INS-1, UP-1)
- Lou Levanti, Illinois (AP-2, INS-2)

=== Quarterbacks ===
- Howard Yerges, Michigan (AP-1, INS-2, UP-1)
- Perry Moss, Illinois (AP-2, INS-2)

=== Halfbacks ===
- Bob Chappuis, Michigan (AP-1, INS-1, UP-1)
- Bump Elliott, Michigan (AP-1, INS-1, UP-1)
- Harry Szulborski, Purdue (AP-2, INS-1)
- George Taliaferro, Indiana (AP-2, INS-2)

=== Fullbacks ===
- Russ Steger, Illinois (AP-1, INS-1 [halfback]; UP-1)
- Jack Weisenburger, Michigan (AP-2, INS-2, UP-2)

== Key ==
AP = Associated Press, chosen by conference coaches

UP = United Press

INS = International News Service

Bold = Consensus first-team selection by the AP, UP and INS

== See also ==
- 1947 College Football All-America Team
