= Red Wilson (baseball) =

American baseball and football player (1929–2014)

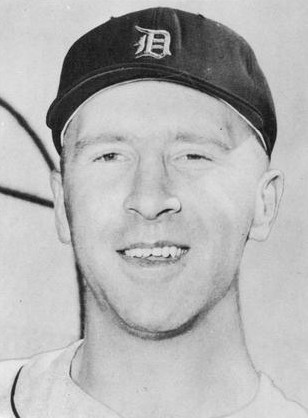
- Catcher
- Born: March 7, 1929; Milwaukee, Wisconsin, U.S.
- Died: August 8, 2014 (aged 85); Fitchburg, Wisconsin, U.S.
- Batted: Right Threw: Right

MLB debut
- September 22, 1951, for the Chicago White Sox

Last MLB appearance
- September 24, 1960, for the Cleveland Indians

MLB statistics
- Batting average: .258
- Home runs: 24
- Runs batted in: 189
- Stats at Baseball Reference

Teams
- Chicago White Sox (1951–1954); Detroit Tigers (1954–1960); Cleveland Indians (1960)

Robert James "Red" Wilson (March 7, 1929 – August 8, 2014) was an American professional baseball and college baseball and football player. He played 10 seasons in Major League Baseball for the Chicago White Sox (1951–1954), Detroit Tigers (1954–1960), and Cleveland Indians (1960), primarily as a catcher.

== University of Wisconsin ==
Born in Milwaukee, Wisconsin, Wilson attended the University of Wisconsin–Madison where he was a star football player for the Wisconsin Badgers. He won Most Valuable Player honors as the center for the Badgers football team in 1947 and 1948, and was also an all-conference center in 1947.

In his senior year, 1949, Wilson was the team captain and won the Big Ten Most Valuable Player award as an end. Besides, he led the Badgers baseball team in hitting with batting averages of .342 and .426 in 1948 and 1949, respectively. As a pitcher, he posted a 17–7 record and earned a spot in the 1950 College World Series. He graduated from Wisconsin in 1951 as an insurance major.

== Major League Baseball ==
Wilson was selected in the fourth round, 52nd pick overall of the 1950 NFL draft by the Cleveland Browns under Paul Brown, but opted for a baseball career after leaving Wisconsin. He was signed by the Chicago White Sox as an amateur free agent in 1950, playing 85 games for them from 1951 to 1953. In May 1954, Wilson was traded to the Tigers in exchange for Matt Batts. Wilson played for Detroit during seven seasons years from 1954 through 1960, before ending his career with the Cleveland Indians in 1960.

Wilson served as the primary catcher for Tigers pitcher Frank Lary, who was known as The Yankee Killer because of his 16–3 record against the New York Yankees with Wilson catching. Wilson batted .354 in the 21 games where he was paired with Lary against the Yankees, .096 above his career average.

His most productive season came in 1958, when he played in a career-high 103 games, while collecting a .299 average with a .373 on-base percentage and a perfect record of 10 stolen bases without being caught, his 10 steals in 1958 is the eighth-best mark in the American League. Wilson also had an excellent year as a catcher in 1958, recording a range factor of 5.93, 0.59 points ahead of the league average for catchers, and caught Jim Bunning's no-hitter against the Boston Red Sox on July 20 of that year. The next season, he improved to a career-high range factor of 6.23 – 0.92 points above the league average.

=== Overview ===
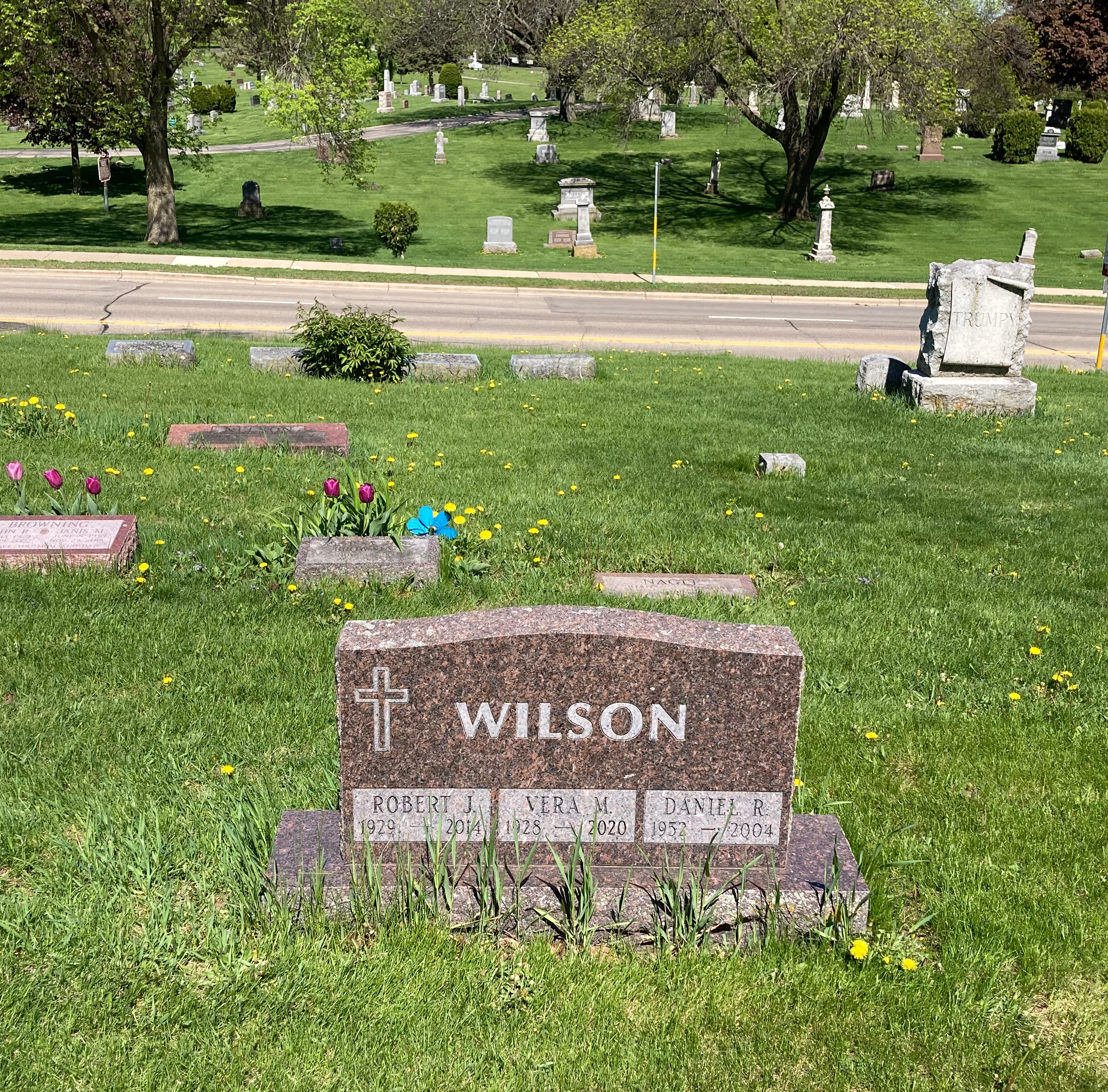
Wilson's grave at Forest Hill Cemetery

In 602 Major League Baseball games, 580 as a catcher, Wilson hit a .258 average and a .338 on-base percentage.

On December 14, 1960, Wilson was selected by the Los Angeles Angels in the 1960 MLB expansion draft, but he retired rather than continue his playing career. Then, pitcher Ted Bowsfield was sent by Cleveland to the Angels in terms of compensation.

Wilson's 1958 baseball card, Topps No. 213, showed him in a truly bizarre pose. The company painted out the natural background of the pictures that year and, in a photo showing Wilson swinging his bat, painted the bat out of the picture too—showing Wilson looking as if his right arm had been amputated a few inches below the shoulder.

== Later life ==
After his playing career, Wilson was a founder and President of the Westgate Bank in Madison, Wisconsin. He was also President of the Wisconsin Alumni Association from 1971 to 1972. Wilson was elected to the Wisconsin Athletic Hall of Fame in 1990.

Wilson died in 2014 in Fitchburg, Wisconsin, at the age of 85, and was buried at Forest Hill Cemetery in Madison.
