= 1947 Loras Duhawks football team =

American college football season

1947 Loras Duhawks football
- Conference: Iowa Conference
- Record: 9–0 (2–0 Iowa)
- Head coach: Wally Fromhart (1st season)
- Home stadium: Rock Bowl

1947 Iowa Conference football standings
	Conf.					Overall
Team	W		L		T	W		L		T
Upper Iowa $	5	–	0	–	0	6	–	1	–	0
Loras *	2	–	0	–	0	9	–	0	–	0
Western Union *	1	–	0	–	0	3	–	2	–	2
Central (IA)	5	–	0	–	1	7	–	1	–	1
Dubuque	4	–	1	–	0	5	–	2	–	0
Simpson (IA)	2	–	1	–	2	3	–	4	–	2
Iowa Wesleyan	3	–	2	–	1	5	–	3	–	1
Wartburg	3	–	2	–	1	4	–	3	–	1
Parsons	2	–	4	–	0	2	–	6	–	0
St. Ambrose *	0	–	1	–	0	5	–	3	–	0
Luther	0	–	5	–	1	1	–	7	–	1
Buena Vista	0	–	5	–	0	3	–	5	–	1
William Penn	0	–	6	–	0	0	–	8	–	0
$ – Conference champion; * – ineligible for conference title

The 1947 Loras Duhawks football team was an American football team that represented Loras College of Dubuque, Iowa as a member of the Iowa Conference during the 1947 college football season. In their first year under head coach Wally Fromhart, the Duhawks compiled a perfect 9–0 record (2–0 in conference games) and outscored opponents by a total of 206 to 57. They did not play enough conference games to qualify for the conference championship.

Loras sought to duplicate the success of Notre Dame, hiring former Notre Dame star Fromhart as its coach, installing Notre Dame's T formation offense, and recruiting 11 regular players from Notre Dame's "feeding grounds" in Chicago. Loras also recruited back Robert Hanlon, who previously played for Notre Dame, to play for the Duhawks; Hanlon was selected by the Associated Press as a first-team player on the 1947 Little All-America college football team.

The team played its home games at the Rock Bowl in Dubuque, Iowa. Loras was one of eight college teams to compile a perfect season in 1947, along with Michigan, Notre Dame, Pepperdine, Missouri Valley, Wesleyan, Jacksonville State, and Denison.

== Schedule ==
Date	Opponent	Site	Result	Attendance	Source
September 20	South Dakota State*	Rock Bowl; Dubuque, IA	W 28–0		
September 27	at Luther	Decorah, IA	W 27–0		
October 4	St. Ambrose	Rock Bowl; Dubuque, IA	W 20–6	10,000	
October 11	Illinois State Normal*	Rock Bowl; Dubuque, IA	W 20–7		
October 18	St. Norbert*^{†}	Rock Bowl; Dubuque, IA	W 6–0	10,000	
October 25	Saint Mary's (MN)*	Rock Bowl; Dubuque, IA	W 32–12		
November 1	at St. Thomas (MN)*	O'Shaughnessy Field; Saint Paul, MN	W 20–19		
November 8	Winona State*	Rock Bowl; Dubuque, IA	W 32–7		
November 15	at Saint Joseph's (IN)*	Rensselaer, IN	W 21–6		
*Non-conference game; ^{†}Homecoming

== Game summaries ==
=== South Dakota State ===
On September 20, Loras opened its season with a 28–0 victory over South Dakota State at the Rock Bowl in Dubuque. Left halfback Mike Elliott scored 16 points with two touchdowns and four extra-point kicks.

=== Luther ===
On September 27, Loras defeated Luther, 27–0, on the road at Decorah, Iowa. Loras out-gained Luther by 327 yards to 20 yards. Loras's touchdowns were scored by Ed Udovich, Don Dophin, and Charles Ward.

=== St. Ambrose ===
On October 4, Loras defeated St. Ambrose, 20–6, before a crowd of approximately 10,000 persons at the Rock Bowl in Dubuque. It was the largest crowd ever to attend a football game in Dubuque. It was also Loras's first victory over St. Ambrose since 1930. St. Ambrose took a 6–o lead in the first quarter, but Loras scored three touchdowns in a ten-minute span of the second quarter. Loras's touchdowns came on a 50-yard pass from quarterback Jack Rohan, a 17-year-old freshman, to Ralph peters, a three-yard run by Bob Hanlon, and a 52-yard pass completion from Peterson to halfback Ed Uvodich. Loras intercepted four of the first five passes thrown by St. Ambrose to jump-start the team's scoring spree.

=== Illinois State Normal ===
On October 11, Loras defeated Illinois State Normal, 20–7, at the Rock Bowl in Dubuque. Loras scored three touchdowns, including a 24-yard touchdown pass from quarterback Jack Rohan to Peterson and a two-yard run by left halfback Mike Elliott.

=== St Norbert ===
On October 18, Loras defeated St. Norbert, 6–0, before a record homecoming crowd of 10,000 at the Rock Bowl. The Duhawks broke St. Norbert's 14-game undefeated streak dating back to 1945. The only points of the game were scored in the second quarter after Loras's Bob Noel blocked a punt at the St. Norbert 38-yard line. Center Bill Moore caught the blocked punt and returned it to St. Norbert's 13-yard line. Quarterback Jack Rohan threw a touchdown pass to Jerry Witry for the score.

=== Saint Mary's ===
On Sunday, October 26, Loras defeated Saint Mary's of Minnesota by a 32–12 at the Rock Bowl in Dubuque. Fullback Bob Hanlon scored three touchdowns for Loras on a two-yard plunge, a 10-yard run, and 28 yards. Halfback Ed Uvodich also scored on a locng pass from quarterback Jack Rohan. Loras tallied 303 rushing yards and intercepted two passes and recovered two Saint Mary's fumbles in the game.

=== St. Thomas ===
On November 1, Loras defeated St. Thomas, 20-19, in Saint Paul, Minnesota. It was the narrowest margin of victory of the year for Loras. Jack Rohan completed a touchdown pass to Gerry Witry that covered 53 yards. Loras also scored on a short run by Dave Brill and a 17-yard run by Dick Mares. St. Thomas scored its final touchdown, a 79-yard pass completion, in the fourth quarter, but the kick for extra point went wide. Mike Elliott converted two of three extra points to give Loras its one-point victory.

=== Winona State ===
On November 8, Loras defeated Winona State, 32–7, at the Rock Bowl in Dubuque. Halfback Ed Uvodich scored three touchdowns on runs of 26, 32 and 50 yards.

=== Saint Joseph's ===
On November 15, Loras defeated Saint Joseph's), 21–6, at Rensselaer, Indiana. Quarterback John Rohan threw three touchdown passes, two to end Ralph Peterson and the other to Bill Treacy. Left halfback Mike Elliott converted all three extra point kicks. The game concluded Loras's first undefeated and untied season since 1922. It was also Loras's first victory over Saint Joseph's, having lost the prior three matches.
