= Wally Fromhart =

American football player and coach (1913–2002)

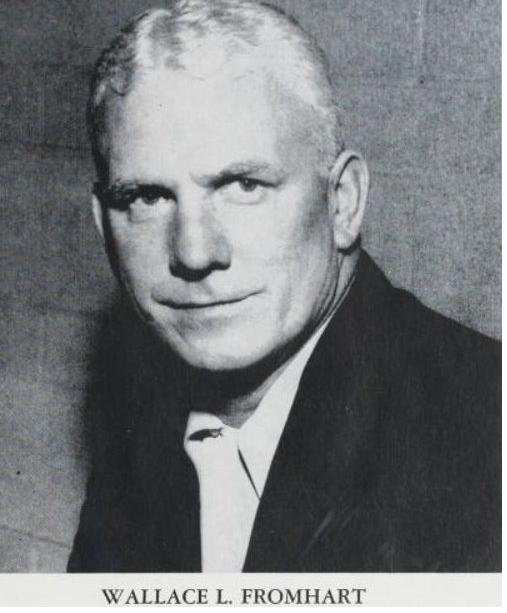

No. 9
- Positions: Quarterback, placekicker

Personal information
- Born: May 18, 1913; Newburg, West Virginia, U.S.
- Died: May 23, 2002 (aged 89); Dowagiac, Michigan, U.S.
- Listed height: 5 ft 11 in (1.80 m)
- Listed weight: 180 lb (82 kg)

Career information
- College: Notre Dame
- NFL draft: 1936: 7 / Pick 61st round

Wallace Leo Fromhart (May 18, 1913 – May 23, 2002) was an American football player and coach. Born in Newburg, West Virginia where he lived and attended school until his freshman year of high school, after which his family moved to Moundsville, West Virginia. Fromhart played varsity baseball and football for Moundsville High School from 1929 to 1931. Following high school graduation, he worked at the local US Stamping plant until 1932 when he was offered, and accepted, an athletic scholarship to attend the University of Notre Dame and play for the university's baseball team. His athletic prowess also landed him the starting quarterback position on the Fighting Irish football team during his junior academic year (1935–36).

Fromhart played for the Notre Dame Fighting Irish football team under coach Elmer Layden (of the famed Four Horsemen) who ran an offensive scheme in which the quarterback had a limited role in the passing game. Fromhart's primary responsibilities on offense were as a blocker for the halfback, Bill Shakespeare (who actually received the bulk of the snaps and passed the ball most often), as well as a key receiver, a place kicker and a punt returner. On defense, he played the safety position. Against rival USC, in 1935, he returned an interception for 82 yards. Fromhart was starting quarterback for Notre Dame in the 18–13 victory against undefeated Ohio State in 1935.

Though he was selected by the Green Bay Packers in the 1936 NFL draft, Fromhart chose instead to remain an additional year at Notre Dame to obtain teaching certification, during which time he also served as graduate assistant coach of the Fighting Irish freshman football team. Upon graduating Notre Dame, Fromhart accepted a position as head football coach for Mt. Carmel High School in Chicago (1937–46), posting a 56–17–10 record, a Catholic League title and two city championships. During his coaching tenure at Mt. Carmel, Fromhart was called to serve in the US Navy as an armed guard officer in the US Merchant Marine (1944–45) in the Atlantic Theater of World War II.

A year after returning from the war, Fromhart accepted a head football coach position at Loras College (1947–1950), in Dubuque, Iowa, where he posted a 27–9 record, including an undefeated season in 1947. During his coaching years at Loras, he also managed the Dubuque minor league baseball team. In 1951, he accepted a position as assistant coach at the University of Detroit under Dutch Clark (1951–1953), and succeeded Clark as head coach (1954–1958). In the latter position, he posted an overall record of 1925, won the Missouri Valley Conference title, and was named Catholic Coach of the Year. Fromhart ended his football coaching career in 1961 as head coach of the Sarnia, Ontario-based Sarnia Golden Bears, a semi-professional football team in the upstart American Football Conference for one season (the conference lasted only one year). With his eldest son (also named Wally Fromhart) as assistant coach, he led the team to an undefeated 10–0 regular season record and one post-season win to claim the American Football Conference championship.

Fromhart died in 2002 and is buried in South Bend, Indiana with his wife Donna Belle (Parvis) Fromhart.

== Head coaching record ==
=== College ===
Year	Team	Overall	Conference	Standing	Bowl/playoffs
Loras Duhawks (Iowa Conference) (1947)
1947	Loras	9–0	2–0	2nd	
Loras Duhawks (Midlands Conference) (1948–1949)
1948	Loras	7–1	2–1	T–1st	
1949	Loras	3–5	0–3	4th	
Loras Duhawks (Iowa Conference / Midlands Conference) (1950)
1950	Loras	8–3	5–0 / 1–2	1st (Northern) / T–3rd	
Loras:		27–9	10–6		
Detroit Titans (Missouri Valley Conference) (1954–1956)
1954	Detroit	2–7	1–3	4th	
1955	Detroit	5–3–1	3–1	T–1st	
1956	Detroit	2–8	0–4	5th	
Detroit Titans (Independent) (1957–1958)
1957	Detroit	6–3			
1958	Detroit	4–4–1			
Detroit:		19–25–2	4–8		
Total:		46–34–2			
National championship Conference title Conference division title or championship game berth
