= 1947 Western Kentucky State Teachers Hilltoppers football team =

American college football season

1947 Western Kentucky State Teachers Hilltoppers football
- Conference: Kentucky Intercollegiate Athletic Conference
- Record: 3–4–2 (1–3 KIAC)
- Head coach: Jesse Thomas (3rd season)
- Captain: Jimmy Haynes

The 1947 Western Kentucky State Teachers Hilltoppers football team represented Western Kentucky State Teachers College (now known as Western Kentucky University) as a member of the Kentucky Intercollegiate Athletic Conference (KIAC) during the 1947 college football season. Led by Jesse Thomas in his third and final season as head coach, the Hilltoppers compiled an overall record of 3–4–2 with a mark of 1–3 in conference play. The team's captain was Jimmy Haynes.

In the final Litkenhous Ratings released in mid-December, Western Kentucky was ranked at No. 289 out of 500 college football teams.

== Schedule ==
Date	Opponent	Site	Result	Attendance	Source
September 26	at Evansville*	Bosse Stadium; Evansville, IN	T 0–0	12,000	
October 4	Arkansas State*	Bowling Green, KY	T 14–14	3,500	
October 11	Tennessee Tech*	Bowling Green, KY	W 13–7		
October 18	Bradley*^{†}	Bowling Green, KY	W 15–13		
October 27	at Louisville	Parkway Field; Louisville, KY	L 13–19		
November 1	at Western Michigan*	Waldo Stadium; Kalamazoo, MI	L 0–39		
November 8	Morehead State	Bowling Green, KY	W 20–0		
November 15	at Eastern Kentucky	Richmond, KY (rivalry)	L 7–27		
November 22	at Murray State	Cutchin Stadium; Murray, KY (rivalry)	L 0–20		
*Non-conference game; ^{†}Homecoming
