= 1947 Louisville Cardinals football team =

American college football season

1947 Louisville Cardinals football

KIAC champion
- Conference: Kentucky Intercollegiate Athletic Conference
- Record: 7–0–1 (2–0 KIAC)
- Head coach: Frank Camp (2nd season)
- Home stadium: Parkway Field

The 1947 Louisville Cardinals football team represented the University of Louisville in the Kentucky Intercollegiate Athletic Conference (KIAC) during the 1947 college football season. In their second season under head coach Frank Camp, the Cardinals compiled a 7–0–1 record (2–0 against conference opponents), won the KIAC championship, and outscored opponents by a combined total of 193 to 63.

In the final Litkenhous Ratings released in mid-December, Louisville was ranked at No. 146 out of 500 college football teams.

== Schedule ==
Date	Time	Opponent	Site	Result	Attendance	Source
September 26		Wittenberg*	Parkway Field; Louisville, KY	W 40–3	6,000	
October 4		at DePauw*	Greencastle, IN	W 37–0		
October 10		Evansville*	Parkway Field; Louisville, KY	W 20–7	10,000	
October 24		Western Kentucky State Teachers	Parkway Field; Louisville, KY	W 19–13	15,000	
November 1		at Saint Joseph's (IN)*	Rensselaer, IN	T 7–7		
November 7		Eastern Kentucky	Parkway Field; Louisville, KY	W 14–13	10,000	
November 14		at Southeastern Louisiana*	Strawberry Stadium; Hammond, LA	W 23–0		
November 22	2:00 p.m.	Washington University*	Parkway Field; Louisville, KY	W 33–20	8,000	
*Non-conference game; All times are in Central time
