= 1947 Arkansas State Indians football team =

American college football season

1947 Arkansas State Indians football
- Conference: Arkansas Intercollegiate Conference
- Record: 4–2–3 ( AIC)
- Head coach: Forrest England (2nd season)
- Home stadium: Kays Stadium

The 1947 Arkansas State Indians football team represented Arkansas State College—now known as Arkansas State University—as a member of the Arkansas Intercollegiate Conference (AIC) during the 1947 college football season. Led by second-year head coach Forrest England, the Indians compiled an overall record of 4–2–3.

In the final Litkenhous Ratings released in mid-December, Arkansas State was ranked at No. 199 out of 500 college football teams.

== Schedule ==
Date	Time	Opponent	Site	Result	Attendance	Source
September 27		Southeast Missouri State	Kays Stadium; Jonesboro, AR	W 25–0		
October 4		at Western Kentucky State Teachers	Bowling Green, KY	T 14–14	3,500	
October 11		Arkansas A&M	Kays Stadium; Jonesboro, AR	W 28–0		
October 18	2:30 p.m.	at Washington University	Francis Field; St. Louis, MO	L 14–40	8,200	
October 25		Arkansas State Teachers	Kays Stadium; Jonesboro, AR	T 0–0		
November 1		Southern Illinois	Kays Stadium; Jonesboro, AR	L 7–12		
November 8		at Pensacola NAS	Pensacola, FL	W 7–6		
November 17		at Memphis State	Crump Stadium; Memphis, TN (rivalry)	T 19–19	3,440	
November 22		Centre	Kays Stadium; Jonesboro, AR	W 45–0		
All times are in Central time
