= 1947 South Dakota State Jackrabbits football team =

American college football season

1947 South Dakota State Jackrabbits football
- Conference: North Central Conference
- Record: 4–5 (3–1 NCC)
- Head coach: Ralph Ginn (1st season)

1947 North Central Conference football standings
	Conf.					Overall
Team	W		L		T	W		L		T
South Dakota +	4	–	0	–	0	7	–	2	–	0
Iowa State Teachers +	4	–	0	–	0	5	–	3	–	1
South Dakota State	3	–	1	–	0	4	–	5	–	0
North Dakota	2	–	2	–	0	4	–	4	–	0
Augustana (SD)	2	–	3	–	0	3	–	5	–	0
Morningside	0	–	4	–	0	4	–	4	–	0
North Dakota State	0	–	5	–	0	1	–	7	–	0
+ – Conference co-champions

The 1947 South Dakota State Jackrabbits football team was an American football team that represented South Dakota State University in the North Central Conference (NCC) during the 1947 college football season. In its first season under head coach Ralph Ginn, the team compiled a 4–5 record and was outscored by a total of 211 to 123.

In the final Litkenhous Ratings released in mid-December, South Dakota State was ranked at No. 366 out of 500 college football teams.

== Schedule ==
Date	Opponent	Site	Result	Attendance	Source
September 20	at Loras	Dubuque, IA	L 0–28		
September 27	St. Cloud Teachers	Brookings, SD	L 6–20	6,000	
October 3	Central (IA)	Brookings, SD	W 39–6		
October 11	at Kansas	Memorial Stadium; Lawrence, KS	L 6–86	17,500	
October 18	at Augustana (SD)	Augustana Stadium; Sioux Falls, SD	W 33–12		
October 25	South Dakota	Brookings, SD (rivalry)	L 7–26	> 10,000	
November 1	North Dakota State	Brookings, SD (rivalry)	W 7–0	3,000	
November 8	at Morningside	Sioux City, IA	W 13–0	3,000	
November 15	at Toledo	Glass Bowl; Toledo, OH	L 12–33		
