= 1947 Connecticut Huskies football team =

American college football season

1947 Connecticut Huskies football
- Conference: Yankee Conference
- Record: 4–4 (1–2 Yankee)
- Head coach: J. Orlean Christian (13th season)
- Home stadium: Gardner Dow Athletic Fields

1947 Yankee Conference football standings
	Conf.					Overall
Team	W		L		T	W		L		T
New Hampshire $	4	–	0	–	0	8	–	1	–	0
Maine	2	–	1	–	0	6	–	1	–	0
Connecticut	1	–	2	–	0	2	–	4	–	0
Rhode Island State	1	–	3	–	0	3	–	4	–	0
Massachusetts	0	–	1	–	1	3	–	4	–	1
Vermont	0	–	1	–	1	3	–	4	–	1
$ – Conference champion

The 1947 Connecticut Huskies football team was an American football team represented the University of Connecticut in the Yankee Conference during the 1947 college football season. The Huskies were led by 13th-year head coach J. Orlean Christian and completed the season with a record of 4–4. This marked the first season of competition in the Yankee Conference, as the New England Conference disbanded after the 1946 season with Northeastern's announced departure. The remaining members joined with UMass and Vermont to create the new conference.

In the final Litkenhous Ratings released in mid-December, Connecticut was ranked at No. 204 out of 500 college football teams.

== Schedule ==
Date	Opponent	Site	Result	Attendance	Source
September 27	at Brown*	Brown Stadium; Providence, RI	L 13–33	15,000	
October 4	at Springfield*	Pratt Field; Springfield, MA	W 14–6	4,000	
October 11	Wesleyan*	Gardner Dow Athletic Fields; Storrs, CT	L 0–12	7,500	
October 18	at Maine	Alumni Field; Orono, ME	L 7–13	5,600	
October 25	Champlain*	Gardner Dow Athletic Fields; Storrs, CT	W 25–7	4,500	
November 1	at Coast Guard*	Jones Field; New London, CT	W 24–0		
November 8	Rhode Island State	Gardner Dow Athletic Fields; Storrs, CT (rivalry)	W 23–0	4,000	
November 15	New Hampshire	Gardner Dow Athletic Fields; Storrs, CT	L 6–14	5,500	
*Non-conference game
