= 1947 Northern Illinois State Huskies football team =

American college football season

1947 Northern Illinois State Huskies football

Hoosier Bowl, L 0–20 vs. Evansville
- Conference: Illinois Intercollegiate Athletic Conference
- Record: 4–3–3 (2–1–1 IIAC)
- Head coach: Chick Evans (19th season)
- Captain: Larry Brink
- Home stadium: Glidden Field

1947 Illinois Intercollegiate Athletic Conference football standings
| | Conf. | | | | | Overall |
| Team | W | | L | | T | W | | L | | T |
|---|---|---|---|---|---|---|---|---|---|---|
| Southern Illinois $ | 3 | – | 0 | – | 1 | 7 | – | 2 | – | 1 |
| Northern Illinois State | 2 | – | 1 | – | 1 | 4 | – | 3 | – | 3 |
| Illinois State Normal | 1 | – | 1 | – | 2 | 4 | – | 3 | – | 2 |
| Eastern Illinois | 2 | – | 2 | – | 0 | 2 | – | 6 | – | 0 |
| Western Illinois | 0 | – | 4 | – | 0 | 4 | – | 4 | – | 1 |
$ – Conference champion

The 1947 Northern Illinois State Huskies football team represented Northern Illinois State Teachers College—now known as Northern Illinois University—as a member of the Illinois Intercollegiate Athletic Conference (IIAC) during the 1947 college football season. Led by 19th-year head coach Chick Evans, the Huskies compiled an overall record of 4–3–3 with a mark of 2–1–1 in conference play, placing second in the IIAC. Northern Illinois State was invited to the Hoosier Bowl, where they lost to Evansville.

In the final Litkenhous Ratings released in mid-December, Northern Illinois was ranked at No. 185 out of 500 college football teams.

The team played home games at the 5,500-seat Glidden Field, located on the east end of campus, in DeKalb, Illinois.

== Schedule ==
| Date | Opponent | Site | Result | Attendance | Source |
|---|---|---|---|---|---|
| September 19 | Aurora Clippers* | Glidden Field; DeKalb, IL | T 6–6 | | |
| September 26 | at St. Ambrose* | Davenport, IA | L 7–20 | | |
| October 3 | Central Michigan* | Glidden Field; DeKalb, IL | T 6–6 | | |
| October 11 | Michigan State Normal* | Glidden Field; DeKalb, IL | W 21–6 | 7,500 | |
| October 18 | at Illinois State Normal | McCormick Field; Normal, IL | T 7–7 | | |
| October 25 | at Southern Illinois | Carbondale, IL | L 0–20 | | |
| November 1 | Western Illinois | Glidden Field; DeKalb, IL | W 33–0 | | |
| November 8 | Eastern Illinois | Glidden Field; DeKalb, IL | W 25–6 | 400 | |
| November 22 | Millikin* | Glidden Field; DeKalb, IL | W 26–6 | | |
| November 29 | at Evansville* | Evansville, IN (Hoosier Bowl) | L 0–20 | | |
*Non-conference game
