= 1947 North Dakota State Bison football team =

American college football season

1947 North Dakota State Bison football
- Conference: North Central Conference
- Record: 1–7 (0–5 NCC)
- Head coach: Stan Kostka (3rd season)
- Home stadium: Dacotah Field

1947 North Central Conference football standings
	Conf.					Overall
Team	W		L		T	W		L		T
South Dakota +	4	–	0	–	0	7	–	2	–	0
Iowa State Teachers +	4	–	0	–	0	5	–	3	–	1
South Dakota State	3	–	1	–	0	4	–	5	–	0
North Dakota	2	–	2	–	0	4	–	4	–	0
Augustana (SD)	2	–	3	–	0	3	–	5	–	0
Morningside	0	–	4	–	0	4	–	4	–	0
North Dakota State	0	–	5	–	0	1	–	7	–	0
+ – Conference co-champions

The 1947 North Dakota State Bison football team was an American football team that North Dakota Agricultural College (now known as North Dakota State University) in the North Central Conference (NCC) during the 1947 college football season. In its third season under head coach Stan Kostka, the team compiled a 1–7 record (0–5 against NCC opponents) and finished last in the NCC.

In the final Litkenhous Ratings released in mid-December, North Dakota State was ranked at No. 350 out of 500 college football teams.

The team played its home games at Dacotah Field in Fargo, North Dakota.

== Schedule ==
Date	Opponent	Site	Result	Attendance	Source
September 12	at Bemidji State*	Bemidji, MN	W 20–0		
September 20	at Iowa*	Iowa Stadium; Iowa City, IA	L 0–59	31,050	
September 26	Gustavus Adolphus*	Dacotah Field; Fargo, ND	L 7–13		
October 3	Iowa State Teachers	Dacotah Field; Fargo, ND	L 12–13		
October 10	South Dakota	Dacotah Field; Fargo, ND	L 7–13		
October 18	North Dakota	Dacotah Field; Fargo, ND (Nickel Trophy)	L 20–25	5,000–6,000	
October 25	Augustana (SD)	Dacotah Field; Fargo, ND	L 7–13		
November 1	at South Dakota State	Brookings, SD (rivalry)	L 0–7	3,000	
*Non-conference game
