= 1947 Akron Zippers football team =

American college football season

1947 Akron Zippers football
- Conference: Ohio Athletic Conference
- Record: 2–6 (2–5 OAC)
- Head coach: Paul Baldacci (2nd season)
- Home stadium: Rubber Bowl

1947 Ohio Athletic Conference football standings
	Conf.					Overall
Team	W		L		T	W		L		T
Denison $	6	–	0	–	0	9	–	0	–	0
Findlay	4	–	0	–	0	9	–	1	–	0
Heidelberg	6	–	1	–	0	7	–	1	–	0
John Carroll	5	–	1	–	0	6	–	3	–	0
Toledo	3	–	1	–	0	9	–	2	–	0
Kent State	3	–	1	–	0	4	–	4	–	0
Baldwin–Wallace	4	–	2	–	0	5	–	4	–	0
Ohio Wesleyan	4	–	2	–	0	6	–	2	–	1
Wittenberg	4	–	4	–	0	4	–	5	–	0
Muskingum	3	–	3	–	0	5	–	3	–	0
Kenyon	1	–	1	–	0	3	–	4	–	0
Wooster	4	–	5	–	0	4	–	5	–	0
Mount Union	3	–	4	–	0	5	–	4	–	0
Ohio Northern	2	–	4	–	0	2	–	5	–	1
Oberlin	1	–	2	–	0	3	–	4	–	1
Wilmington (OH)	1	–	2	–	0	2	–	6	–	0
Akron	2	–	5	–	0	2	–	6	–	0
Ashland	1	–	3	–	0	3	–	5	–	0
Marietta	1	–	3	–	0	2	–	5	–	0
Otterbein	1	–	4	–	0	2	–	6	–	1
Capital	1	–	6	–	0	2	–	6	–	1
Case	0	–	5	–	0	1	–	7	–	0
$ – Conference champion

The 1947 Akron Zippers football team was an American football team that represented the University of Akron as a member of the Ohio Athletic Conference (OAC) during the 1947 college football season. In its second and final season under head coach Paul Baldacci, the team compiled am overall record of 2–6 with a mark of 2–5 in conference play and was outscored by a total of 162 to 44.

In the final Litkenhous Ratings released in mid-December, Akron was ranked at No. 356 out of 500 college football teams.

The team played its home games at the Rubber Bowl in Akron, Ohio.

== Schedule ==
Date	Opponent	Site	Result	Attendance	Source
October 3	Baldwin–Wallace	Rubber Bowl; Akron, OH	L 0–28	8,412	
October 11	at Case Tech	Cleveland, OH	W 12–6		
October 18	Mount Union	Rubber Bowl; Akron, OH	W 19–14		
October 25	at Toledo	Glass Bowl; Toledo, OH	L 7–38		
October 31	Western Reserve*	Rubber Bowl; Akron, OH	L 0–18	5,278	
November 8	at Wooster	Wooster, OH	L 6–21		
November 14	at Kent State	Memorial Stadium; Kent, OH (Wagon Wheel)	L 0–6	15,000	
November 22	John Carroll	Rubber Bowl; Akron, OH	L 0–31		
*Non-conference game
