= 1947 Eastern Illinois Panthers football team =

American college football season

1947 Eastern Illinois Panthers football
- Conference: Illinois Intercollegiate Athletic Conference
- Record: 2–6 (2–2 IIAC)
- Head coach: Maynard O'Brien (2nd season)
- Home stadium: Schahrer Field

1947 Illinois Intercollegiate Athletic Conference football standings
	Conf.					Overall
Team	W		L		T	W		L		T
Southern Illinois $	3	–	0	–	1	7	–	2	–	1
Northern Illinois State	2	–	1	–	1	4	–	3	–	3
Illinois State Normal	1	–	1	–	2	4	–	3	–	2
Eastern Illinois	2	–	2	–	0	2	–	6	–	0
Western Illinois	0	–	4	–	0	4	–	4	–	1
$ – Conference champion

The 1947 Eastern Illinois Panthers football team represented Eastern Illinois University as a member of the Illinois Intercollegiate Athletic Conference (IIAC) during the 1947 college football season. The team was led by second-year head coach Maynard O'Brien and played their home games at Schahrer Field in Charleston, Illinois. The Panthers finished the season with a 2–6 record overall and a 2–2 record in conference play.

In the final Litkenhous Ratings released in mid-December, Eastern Illinois was ranked at No. 290 out of 500 college football teams.

== Schedule ==
Date	Opponent	Site	Result	Attendance	Source
September 27	Eastern Kentucky*	Schahrer Field; Charleston, IL	L 13–14		
October 4	at Ball State*	Muncie, IN	L 13–21		
October 11	at Millikin*	James Millikin University Field; Decatur, IL	L 13–14		
October 25	Illinois State Normal^{†}	Schahrer Field; Charleston, IL	W 13–6		
November 1	Indiana State*	Schahrer Field; Charleston, IL	L 13–14		
November 8	at Northern Illinois State	Glidden Field; DeKalb, IL	L 6–25	400	
November 15	at Southern Illinois	McAndrew Stadium; Carbondale, IL	L 13–33		
November 22	Western Illinois	Schahrer Field; Charleston, IL	W 19–0		
*Non-conference game; ^{†}Homecoming
