= 1947 Toledo Rockets football team =

American college football season

1947 Toledo Rockets football

Glass Bowl, W 20–14 vs. New Hampshire
- Conference: Ohio Athletic Conference
- Record: 9–2 (3–1 OAC)
- Head coach: Bill Orwig (2nd season)
- Captain: Tony Wolodzko
- Home stadium: Glass Bowl

1947 Ohio Athletic Conference football standings
	Conf.					Overall
Team	W		L		T	W		L		T
Denison $	6	–	0	–	0	9	–	0	–	0
Findlay	4	–	0	–	0	9	–	1	–	0
Heidelberg	6	–	1	–	0	7	–	1	–	0
John Carroll	5	–	1	–	0	6	–	3	–	0
Toledo	3	–	1	–	0	9	–	2	–	0
Kent State	3	–	1	–	0	4	–	4	–	0
Baldwin–Wallace	4	–	2	–	0	5	–	4	–	0
Ohio Wesleyan	4	–	2	–	0	6	–	2	–	1
Wittenberg	4	–	4	–	0	4	–	5	–	0
Muskingum	3	–	3	–	0	5	–	3	–	0
Kenyon	1	–	1	–	0	3	–	4	–	0
Wooster	4	–	5	–	0	4	–	5	–	0
Mount Union	3	–	4	–	0	5	–	4	–	0
Ohio Northern	2	–	4	–	0	2	–	5	–	1
Oberlin	1	–	2	–	0	3	–	4	–	1
Wilmington (OH)	1	–	2	–	0	2	–	6	–	0
Akron	2	–	5	–	0	2	–	6	–	0
Ashland	1	–	3	–	0	3	–	5	–	0
Marietta	1	–	3	–	0	2	–	5	–	0
Otterbein	1	–	4	–	0	2	–	6	–	1
Capital	1	–	6	–	0	2	–	6	–	1
Case	0	–	5	–	0	1	–	7	–	0
$ – Conference champion

The 1947 Toledo Rockets football team was an American football team that represented Toledo University (renamed the University of Toledo in 1967) in the Ohio Athletic Conference (OAC) during the 1947 college football season. In their second season under head coach Bill Orwig, the Rockets compiled a 9–2 record (3–1 against OAC opponents), outscored all opponents by a combined total of 255 to 115, and defeated New Hampshire, 20–14, in the 1947 Glass Bowl game. The 1947 season was the first nine-win season in program history, a feat that no Toledo team repeated until 1967.

Emerson Cole, who later played four years in the NFL, twice rushed for at least 200 yards in a game during the 1947 season. Cole also set a school record (later broken) with 31 rushing touchdowns in 1947. Lee Pete established a school record with a 65.2% pass completion percentage, a record that stood until 2001. He also established a school record (later broken) with an 86-yard touchdown pass to Dave Hamlar. Pete's 1,201 yards of total offense was also a single-season school record until 1964, when it was broken by Dan Simrell with 1,616 yards. Tony Wolodzko was the team captain. Tackles Ted Zuchowski and Frank Pizza were selected in the 1948 NFL draft by the Pittsburgh Steelers and Detroit Lions, respectively.

Toledo was ranked at No. 107 (out of 500 college football teams) in the final Litkenhous Ratings for 1947.

== Schedule ==
Date	Opponent	Site	Result	Attendance	Source
September 20	Great Lakes*	Glass Bowl; Toledo, OH	W 40–0		
September 27	Case	Glass Bowl; Toledo, OH	W 41–0		
October 4	John Carroll	Glass Bowl; Toledo, OH	L 13–35	11,000	
October 11	Youngstown*	Glass Bowl; Toledo, OH	W 21–7	9,000	
October 18	at Dayton*	Dayton Stadium; Dayton, OH	W 14–13		
October 25	Akron	Glass Bowl; Toledo, OH	W 38–7		
November 1	Baldwin–Wallace	Glass Bowl; Toledo, OH	W 14–6		
November 8	at Wayne*	Keyworth Stadium; Hamtramck, MI	W 7–0		
November 15	South Dakota State*	Glass BowlToledo, OH	W 33–12		
November 22	at Canisius*	Buffalo, NY	L 13–21		
December 6	New Hampshire*	Glass Bowl; Toledo, OH (Glass Bowl)	W 20–14	13,500	
*Non-conference game

== After the season ==
=== NFL draft ===
The following Rockets were selected in the 1948 NFL draft following the season.

Round	Pick	Player	Position	NFL club
27	247	Frank Pizza	Tackle	Detroit Lions
31	290	Ted Zuchowski	Tackle	Pittsburgh Steelers
