= 1947 Illinois State Normal Redbirds football team =

American college football season

1947 Illinois State Normal Redbirds football
- Conference: Illinois Intercollegiate Athletic Conference
- Record: 4–3–2 (1–1–2 IIAC)
- Head coach: Edwin Struck (3rd season)
- Captain: Walter Laitas
- Home stadium: McCormick Field

1947 Illinois Intercollegiate Athletic Conference football standings
	Conf.					Overall
Team	W		L		T	W		L		T
Southern Illinois $	3	–	0	–	1	7	–	2	–	1
Northern Illinois State	2	–	1	–	1	4	–	3	–	3
Illinois State Normal	1	–	1	–	2	4	–	3	–	2
Eastern Illinois	2	–	2	–	0	2	–	6	–	0
Western Illinois	0	–	4	–	0	4	–	4	–	1
$ – Conference champion

The 1947 Illinois State Normal Redbirds football team represented Illinois State Normal University—now known as Illinois State University—as a member of the Illinois Intercollegiate Athletic Conference (IIAC) during the 1947 college football season. The team was led by third-year head coach Edwin Struck and played its home games at McCormick Field. The Redbirds finished the season with a 4–3–2 overall record and a 1–1–2 record in conference play, placing third in the IIAC.

== Schedule ==
Date	Time	Opponent	Site	Result	Attendance	Source
September 27		Indiana State*	McCormick Field; Normal, IL	W 20–7		
October 3		at Michigan State Normal*	Briggs Field; Ypsilanti, MI	W 6–0		
October 11		at Loras*	Dubuque, IA	L 7–20		
October 18		Northern Illinois State	McCormick Field; Normal, IL	T 7–7		
October 25		at Eastern Illinois	Schahrer Field; Charleston, IL (rivalry)	L 6–13		
November 1	2:00 p.m.	Washington University*^{†}	McCormick Field; Normal, IL	L 13–14	5,000	
November 8		Southern Illinois	McCormick Field; Normal, IL	T 6–6	600	
November 15		at Western Illinois	Morgan Field; Macomb, IL	W 26–0		
November 22		Illinois Wesleyan*	McCormick Field; Normal, IL	W 12–3		
*Non-conference game; ^{†}Homecoming; All times are in Central time
