= 1947 Ball State Cardinals football team =

American college football season

1947 Ball State Cardinals football
- Conference: Independent
- Record: 5–1–2
- Head coach: John Magnabosco (12th season)

1947 Midwestern non-major college football independents records
	Conf.			Overall
Team	W	L	T	W		L		T
Youngstown		–		8	–	2	–	0
Ball State		–		5	–	1	–	2
Ohio Wesleyan		–		6	–	2	–	1
Wayne		–		5	–	2	–	0
Dayton		–		6	–	3	–	0
Washington University		–		5	–	3	–	0
Bowling Green		–		5	–	5	–	0
Michigan Tech		–		3	–	3	–	1
Xavier		–		4	–	4	–	1
Central Michigan		–		2	–	5	–	1
Valparaiso		–		2	–	5	–	1
Michigan State Normal		–		1	–	6	–	0

The 1947 Ball State Cardinals football team was an American football team that represented Ball State Teachers College (later renamed Ball State University) as an independent during the 1947 college football season. In their 12th season under head coach John Magnabosco, the Cardinals compiled a 5–1–2 record.

In the final Litkenhous Ratings released in mid-December, Ball State was ranked at No. 265 out of 500 college football teams.

== Schedule ==
Date	Opponent	Site	Result	Attendance	Source
September 27	at Butler	Butler Bowl; Indianapolis, IN	T 6–6	8,000	
October 4	Eastern Illinois	Ball State Field; Muncie, IN	W 21–13		
October 11	Valparaiso^{†}	Ball State Field; Muncie, IN	W 18–14	4,000	
October 18	Saint Joseph's (IN)	Muncie, IN	T 6–6		
October 23	at Anderson (IN)	Anderson, IN	W 9–0	3,000	
November 1	at Manchester	North Manchester, IN	W 19–0		
November 6	at Michigan State Normal	Briggs Field; Ypsilanti, MI	L 7–14		
November 15	Indiana State	Ball State Field; Muncie, IN (Victory Bell)	W 14–0		
^{†}Homecoming
