= 1947 Washington University Bears football team =

American college football season

1947 Washington University Bears football
- Conference: Independent
- Record: 5–3
- Head coach: Weeb Ewbank (1st season)
- Home stadium: Francis Field

1947 Midwestern non-major college football independents records
| | Conf. | | | Overall |
| Team | W | L | T | W | | L | | T |
|---|---|---|---|---|---|---|---|---|
| Youngstown | | – | | 8 | – | 2 | – | 0 |
| Ball State | | – | | 5 | – | 1 | – | 2 |
| Ohio Wesleyan | | – | | 6 | – | 2 | – | 1 |
| Wayne | | – | | 5 | – | 2 | – | 0 |
| Dayton | | – | | 6 | – | 3 | – | 0 |
| Washington University | | – | | 5 | – | 3 | – | 0 |
| Bowling Green | | – | | 5 | – | 5 | – | 0 |
| Michigan Tech | | – | | 3 | – | 3 | – | 1 |
| Xavier | | – | | 4 | – | 4 | – | 1 |
| Central Michigan | | – | | 2 | – | 5 | – | 1 |
| Valparaiso | | – | | 2 | – | 5 | – | 1 |
| Michigan State Normal | | – | | 1 | – | 6 | – | 0 |

The 1947 Washington University Bears football team represented Washington University in St. Louis as an independent during the 1947 college football season. Led by first-year head coach Weeb Ewbank, the Bears compiled a record of 5–3. Washington University played home games at Francis Field in St. Louis.

== Schedule ==
| Date | Time | Opponent | Site | Result | Attendance | Source |
|---|---|---|---|---|---|---|
| September 27 | 2:30 p.m. | Missouri Valley | Francis Field; St. Louis, MO | L 13–28 | 9,000 | |
| October 4 | | at Western Michigan | Waldo Stadium; Kalamazoo, MI | L 6–14 | 7,000 | |
| October 11 | | at Oberlin | Oberlin, OH | W 35–7 | 3,200 | |
| October 18 | 2:30 p.m. | Arkansas State | Francis Field; St. Louis, MO | W 40–14 | 8,200 | |
| November 1 | 2:00 p.m. | at Illinois State Normal | McCormick Field; Normal, IL | W 14–13 | 5,000 | |
| November 8 | 2:00 p.m. | Central (MO) | Francis Field; St. Louis, MO | W 27–7 | 7,500 | |
| November 15 | 2:00 p.m. | Grinnell^{†} | Francis Field; St. Louis, MO | W 40–12 | 9,700 | |
| November 22 | 2:00 p.m. | at Louisville | Parkway Field; Louisville, KY | L 20–33 | 8,000 | |
^{†}Homecoming; All times are in Central time
