= 1947 Michigan State Normal Hurons football team =

American college football season

1947 Michigan State Normal Hurons football
- Conference: Independent
- Record: 1–6
- Head coach: Elton Rynearson (25th season)
- Captain: Charles H. Lane
- Home stadium: Briggs Field

1947 Midwestern non-major college football independents records
| | Conf. | | | Overall |
| Team | W | L | T | W | | L | | T |
|---|---|---|---|---|---|---|---|---|
| Youngstown | | – | | 8 | – | 2 | – | 0 |
| Ball State | | – | | 5 | – | 1 | – | 2 |
| Ohio Wesleyan | | – | | 6 | – | 2 | – | 1 |
| Wayne | | – | | 5 | – | 2 | – | 0 |
| Dayton | | – | | 6 | – | 3 | – | 0 |
| Washington University | | – | | 5 | – | 3 | – | 0 |
| Bowling Green | | – | | 5 | – | 5 | – | 0 |
| Michigan Tech | | – | | 3 | – | 3 | – | 1 |
| Xavier | | – | | 4 | – | 4 | – | 1 |
| Central Michigan | | – | | 2 | – | 5 | – | 1 |
| Valparaiso | | – | | 2 | – | 5 | – | 1 |
| Michigan State Normal | | – | | 1 | – | 6 | – | 0 |

The 1947 Michigan State Normal Hurons football team represented Michigan State Normal College (later renamed Eastern Michigan University) as an independent during the 1947 college football season. In their 25th season under head coach Elton Rynearson, the Hurons compiled a 1–6 record and were outscored by their opponents, 106 to 29. After losing the first six games of the season, the Hurons defeated Ball State, 14–7, in the final game of the season. Charles H. Lane was the team captain. The team played its home games at Briggs Field on the school's campus in Ypsilanti, Michigan.

In the final Litkenhous Ratings released in mid-December, Michigan State Normal was ranked at No. 400 out of 500 college football teams.

== Schedule ==
| Date | Opponent | Site | Result | Attendance | Source |
|---|---|---|---|---|---|
| September 26 | at Alma | Alma, MI | L 0–12 | | |
| October 3 | Illinois State Normal | Briggs Field; Ypsilanti, MI | L 0–6 | | |
| October 11 | at Northern Illinois State | Glidden Field; DeKalb, IL | L 6–21 | 7,500 | |
| October 18 | Hope ^{†} | Briggs Field; Ypsilanti, MI | L 7–12 | | |
| October 24 | Hillsdale | Briggs Field; Ypsilanti, MI | L 2–15 | | |
| October 31 | at Central Michigan | Mount Pleasant, MI (rivalry) | L 0–33 | | |
| November 6 | Ball State | Briggs Field; Ypsilanti, MI | W 14–7 | | |
^{†}Homecoming
