= 1947 Iowa State Teachers Panthers football team =

American college football season

1947 Iowa State Teachers Panthers football

NCC co-champion
- Conference: North Central Conference
- Record: 5–3–1 (4–0 NCC)
- Head coach: Clyde Starbeck (10th season)
- Home stadium: O. R. Latham Stadium

1947 North Central Conference football standings
	Conf.					Overall
Team	W		L		T	W		L		T
South Dakota +	4	–	0	–	0	7	–	2	–	0
Iowa State Teachers +	4	–	0	–	0	5	–	3	–	1
South Dakota State	3	–	1	–	0	4	–	5	–	0
North Dakota	2	–	2	–	0	4	–	4	–	0
Augustana (SD)	2	–	3	–	0	3	–	5	–	0
Morningside	0	–	4	–	0	4	–	4	–	0
North Dakota State	0	–	5	–	0	1	–	7	–	0
+ – Conference co-champions

The 1947 Iowa State Teachers Panthers football team represented Iowa State Teachers College in the North Central Conference during the 1947 college football season. In its tenth season under head coach Clyde Starbeck, the team compiled a 5–3–1 record (4–0 against NCC opponents) and tied for the conference championship.

In the final Litkenhous Ratings released in mid-December, Iowa State Teachers was ranked at No. 154 out of 500 college football teams.

== Schedule ==
Date	Opponent	Site	Result	Attendance	Source
September 20	at Iowa State*	Clyde Williams Field; Ames, IA	L 14–31	10,544–12,000	
September 27	North Dakota	O. R. Latham Stadium; Cedar Falls, IA	W 21–0	3,500	
October 3	at North Dakota State	Dacotah Field; Fargo, ND	W 13–12		
October 11	Emporia State Teachers*	O. R. Latham Stadium; Cedar Falls, IA	W 33–6		
October 18	at Western Michigan*	Waldo Stadium; Kalamazoo, MI	L 0–14		
October 25	Morningside^{†}	O. R. Latham Stadium; Cedar Falls, IA	W 31–13		
November 1	at Augustana (SD)	Viking Stadium; Sioux Falls, IA	W 39–0		
November 8	at Drake*	Drake Stadium; Des Moines, IA	T 6–6	13,000	
November 15	at Bowling Green*	Bowling Green, OH	L 7–19	2,000	
*Non-conference game; ^{†}Homecoming
