= 1947 Massachusetts Statesmen football team =

American college football season

1947 Massachusetts Statesmen football
- Conference: Yankee Conference
- Record: 3–4–1 (0–1–1 Yankee)
- Head coach: Thomas Eck (2nd season)
- Home stadium: Alumni Field

1947 Yankee Conference football standings
| | Conf. | | | | | Overall |
| Team | W | | L | | T | W | | L | | T |
|---|---|---|---|---|---|---|---|---|---|---|
| New Hampshire $ | 4 | – | 0 | – | 0 | 8 | – | 1 | – | 0 |
| Maine | 2 | – | 1 | – | 0 | 6 | – | 1 | – | 0 |
| Connecticut | 1 | – | 2 | – | 0 | 2 | – | 4 | – | 0 |
| Rhode Island State | 1 | – | 3 | – | 0 | 3 | – | 4 | – | 0 |
| Massachusetts | 0 | – | 1 | – | 1 | 3 | – | 4 | – | 1 |
| Vermont | 0 | – | 1 | – | 1 | 3 | – | 4 | – | 1 |
$ – Conference champion

The 1947 Massachusetts Statesmen football team was an American football team that represented the University of Massachusetts in the Yankee Conference during the 1947 college football season. In its third season under head coach Thomas Eck, the team compiled a 3–4–1 record (0–1–1 in conference play).

In the final Litkenhous Ratings released in mid-December, Massachusetts State was ranked at No. 343 out of 500 college football teams.

The team played its home games at Alumni Field in Amherst, Massachusetts.

The Yankee Conference began play in 1947, as Massachusetts joined the other land-grant colleges in New England to form the new conference.

== Schedule ==
| Date | Opponent | Site | Result | Attendance | Source |
|---|---|---|---|---|---|
| September 27 | Bates* | Alumni Field; Amherst, MA | L 6–14 | 6,000 | |
| October 4 | at Bowdoin* | Whittier Field; Brunswick, ME | W 7–6 | | |
| October 11 | at Worcester Tech* | Alumni Field; Worcester, MA | W 33–0 | | |
| October 18 | Rhode Island State | Alumni Field; Amherst, MA | L 13–20 | > 4,500 | |
| October 25 | Norwich^{†}* | Alumni Field; Amherst, MA | W 39–0 | > 4,500 | |
| November 1 | at Vermont | Centennial Field; Burlington, VT | T 7–7 | 4,500 | |
| November 8 | at Springfield* | Pratt Field; Springfield, MA | L 7–14 | | |
| November 15 | Tufts* | Alumni Field; Amherst, MA | L 6–20 | 4,000 | |
*Non-conference game; ^{†}Homecoming
