= 1947 Xavier Musketeers football team =

American college football season

1947 Xavier Musketeers football
- Conference: Independent
- Record: 4–4–1
- Head coach: Ed Kluska (1st season)
- Home stadium: Xavier Stadium

1947 Midwestern non-major college football independents records
	Conf.			Overall
Team	W	L	T	W		L		T
Youngstown		–		8	–	2	–	0
Ball State		–		5	–	1	–	2
Ohio Wesleyan		–		6	–	2	–	1
Wayne		–		5	–	2	–	0
Dayton		–		6	–	3	–	0
Washington University		–		5	–	3	–	0
Bowling Green		–		5	–	5	–	0
Michigan Tech		–		3	–	3	–	1
Xavier		–		4	–	4	–	1
Central Michigan		–		2	–	5	–	1
Valparaiso		–		2	–	5	–	1
Michigan State Normal		–		1	–	6	–	0

The 1947 Xavier Musketeers football team was an American football team that represented Xavier University as an independent during the 1947 college football season. In its first season under head coach Ed Kluska, the team compiled a 4–4–1 record.

Xavier was ranked at No. 96 (out of 500 college football teams) in the final Litkenhous Ratings for 1947.

== Schedule ==
Date	Opponent	Site	Result	Attendance	Source
September 20	Bowling Green	Xavier Stadium; Cincinnati, OH	W 2–0	15,000	
September 26	at Western Michigan*	Xavier Stadium; Cincinnati, OH	W 19–0	11,000	
October 4	Kentucky	Xavier Stadium; Cincinnati, OH	L 7–20	15,000	
October 10	John Carroll	Xavier Stadium; Cincinnati, OH	W 21–0	11,000	
October 18	at Miami (OH)*	Xavier Stadium; Cincinnati, OH	T 6–6	13,000	
October 25	at Cincinnati*	Nippert Stadium; Cincinnati, OH	L 25–27	30,000	
November 1	at Dayton	Dayton Stadium; Dayton, OH	L 6–38	12,000	
November 15	Marshall	Xavier Stadium; Cincinnati, OH	W 18–7	8,000	
November 22	Ohio*	Peden Stadium; Athens, OH	L 7–12		
*Non-conference game
