= 1947 Vermont Catamounts football team =

American college football season

1947 Vermont Catamounts football
- Conference: Yankee Conference
- Record: 3–4–1 (0–1–1 Yankee)
- Head coach: John C. Evans (5th season)
- Home stadium: Centennial Field

1947 Yankee Conference football standings
	Conf.					Overall
Team	W		L		T	W		L		T
New Hampshire $	4	–	0	–	0	8	–	1	–	0
Maine	2	–	1	–	0	6	–	1	–	0
Connecticut	1	–	2	–	0	2	–	4	–	0
Rhode Island State	1	–	3	–	0	3	–	4	–	0
Massachusetts	0	–	1	–	1	3	–	4	–	1
Vermont	0	–	1	–	1	3	–	4	–	1
$ – Conference champion

The 1947 Vermont Catamounts football team was an American football team that represented the University of Vermont as a member of the Yankee Conference during the 1947 college football season. In its fifth season under head coach John C. Evans, the team compiled a 3–4–1 record (0–1–1 against conference opponents) and finished in a tie for last place in the Yankee Conference.

In the final Litkenhous Ratings released in mid-December, Vermont was ranked at No. 398 out of 500 college football teams.

The team played its home games at Centennial Field in Burlington, Vermont.

== Schedule ==
Date	Opponent	Site	Result	Attendance	Source
September 27	Saint Michael's*	Centennial Field; Burlington, VT	W 28–6	3,500	
October 4	Colby*	Centennial Field; Burlington, VT	W 27–3	2,000	
October 11	at Union (NY)*	Alexander Field; Schenectady, NY	L 7–20	3,800	
October 18	Norwich*^{†}	Centennial Field; Burlington, VT	W 33–0	7,000	
October 25	New Hampshire	Lewis Stadium; Durham, NH	L 6–28		
November 1	Massachusetts	Centennial Field; Burlington, VT	T 7–7	4,500	
November 8	at Rochester*	River Field; Rochester, NY	L 6–7	4,000	
November 15	at Middlebury*	Porter Field; Middlebury, VT	L 0–19	4,100	
*Non-conference game; ^{†}Homecoming
