= 1947 Maine Black Bears football team =

American college football season

1947 Maine Black Bears football

Maine state champion
- Conference: Yankee Conference
- Record: 6–1 (2–1 Yankee)
- Head coach: George E. Allen (3rd season)
- Home stadium: Alumni Field

1947 Yankee Conference football standings
	Conf.					Overall
Team	W		L		T	W		L		T
New Hampshire $	4	–	0	–	0	8	–	1	–	0
Maine	2	–	1	–	0	6	–	1	–	0
Connecticut	1	–	2	–	0	2	–	4	–	0
Rhode Island State	1	–	3	–	0	3	–	4	–	0
Massachusetts	0	–	1	–	1	3	–	4	–	1
Vermont	0	–	1	–	1	3	–	4	–	1
$ – Conference champion

The 1947 Maine Black Bears football team was an American football team that represented the University of Maine as a member of the Yankee Conference during the 1947 college football season. In its third season under head coach George E. Allen, the team compiled a 6–1 record (2–1 against conference opponents) and finished in second place in the Yankee Conference. With non-conference victories over the teams from Colby, Bowdoin, and Bates Colleges, the team won the Maine state championship for 1947.

In the final Litkenhous Ratings released in mid-December, Maine was ranked at No. 214 out of 500 college football teams.

The team played its home games at Alumni Field in Orono, Maine, and was led on offense by backs Phil Coulombe, Henry "Rabbit" Dombkowski, and Hal Parady, and end Alan Wing.

== Schedule ==
Date	Opponent	Site	Result	Attendance	Source
September 27	at Rhode Island State	Meade Stadium; Kingston, RI	W 33–13		
October 4	Northeastern*	Alumni Field; Orono, ME	W 26–6	7,000	
October 11	at New Hampshire	Lewis Stadium; Durham, NH (rivalry)	L 7–28	7,500	
October 18	Connecticut	Alumni Field; Orono, ME	W 13–7	5,600	
November 1	at Colby*	Waterville, ME	W 33–6	4,500	
November 8	Bowdoin*	Alumni Field; Orono, ME	W 13–0	9,500	
November 15	at Bates*	Lewiston, ME	W 19–13	4,000	
*Non-conference game
