= 1947 Rhode Island State Rams football team =

American college football season

1947 Rhode Island State Rams football
- Conference: Yankee Conference
- Record: 3–4 (1–3 Yankee)
- Head coach: Bill Beck (3rd season)
- Home stadium: Meade Stadium

1947 Yankee Conference football standings
	Conf.					Overall
Team	W		L		T	W		L		T
New Hampshire $	4	–	0	–	0	8	–	1	–	0
Maine	2	–	1	–	0	6	–	1	–	0
Connecticut	1	–	2	–	0	2	–	4	–	0
Rhode Island State	1	–	3	–	0	3	–	4	–	0
Massachusetts	0	–	1	–	1	3	–	4	–	1
Vermont	0	–	1	–	1	3	–	4	–	1
$ – Conference champion

The 1947 Rhode Island State Rams football team was an American football team that represented Rhode Island State College (later renamed the University of Rhode Island) as a member of the Yankee Conference during the 1947 college football season. In its third season under head coach Bill Beck, the team compiled a 3–4 record (1–3 against conference opponents) and finished in fourth place in the Yankee Conference. The team played its home games at Meade Stadium in Kingston, Rhode Island.

In the final Litkenhous Ratings released in mid-December, Rhode Island was ranked at No. 379 out of 500 college football teams.

== Schedule ==
Date	Opponent	Site	Result	Attendance	Source
September 27	Maine	Meade Stadium; Kingston, RI	L 13–33	4,000	
October 4	New Hampshire^{†}	Meade Stadium; Kingston, RI	L 7–33	3,000	
October 11	at Brown*	Brown Stadium; Providence, RI (rivalry)	L 6–55	15,000	
October 18	at Massachusetts	Alumni Field; Amherst, MA	W 20–13	> 4,500	
October 25	Coast Guard*	Meade Stadium; Kingston, RI	W 27–7	4,000	
November 1	Massachusetts State College–Fort Devens*	Meade Stadium; Kingston, RI	W 38–13	4,000	
November 8	at Connecticut	Gardner Dow Field; Storrs, CT (rivalry)	L 0–23	4,000	
*Non-conference game; ^{†}Homecoming
