= 1947 Kent State Golden Flashes football team =

American college football season

1947 Kent State Golden Flashes football
- Conference: Ohio Athletic Conference
- Record: 4–4 (3–1 OAC)
- Head coach: Trevor J. Rees (2nd season)
- Home stadium: Memorial Stadium

1947 Ohio Athletic Conference football standings
	Conf.					Overall
Team	W		L		T	W		L		T
Denison $	6	–	0	–	0	9	–	0	–	0
Findlay	4	–	0	–	0	9	–	1	–	0
Heidelberg	6	–	1	–	0	7	–	1	–	0
John Carroll	5	–	1	–	0	6	–	3	–	0
Toledo	3	–	1	–	0	9	–	2	–	0
Kent State	3	–	1	–	0	4	–	4	–	0
Baldwin–Wallace	4	–	2	–	0	5	–	4	–	0
Ohio Wesleyan	4	–	2	–	0	6	–	2	–	1
Wittenberg	4	–	4	–	0	4	–	5	–	0
Muskingum	3	–	3	–	0	5	–	3	–	0
Kenyon	1	–	1	–	0	3	–	4	–	0
Wooster	4	–	5	–	0	4	–	5	–	0
Mount Union	3	–	4	–	0	5	–	4	–	0
Ohio Northern	2	–	4	–	0	2	–	5	–	1
Oberlin	1	–	2	–	0	3	–	4	–	1
Wilmington (OH)	1	–	2	–	0	2	–	6	–	0
Akron	2	–	5	–	0	2	–	6	–	0
Ashland	1	–	3	–	0	3	–	5	–	0
Marietta	1	–	3	–	0	2	–	5	–	0
Otterbein	1	–	4	–	0	2	–	6	–	1
Capital	1	–	6	–	0	2	–	6	–	1
Case	0	–	5	–	0	1	–	7	–	0
$ – Conference champion

The 1947 Kent State Golden Flashes football team was an American football team that represented Kent State University as a member of the Ohio Athletic Conference (OAC) during the 1947 college football season. In their second season under head coach Trevor J. Rees, the team compiled a 4–4 record (3–1 against OAC opponents), finished in a tie for fifth place in the conference, and was outscored by a total of 95 to 89.

In the final Litkenhous Ratings released in mid-December, Kent State was ranked at No. 160 out of 500 college football teams.

The team played its home games at Memorial Stadium in Kent, Ohio.

== Schedule ==
Date	Opponent	Site	Result	Attendance	Source
September 27	vs. Mount Union	Fawcett Stadium; Canton, OH	W 13–6	15,000	
October 4	vs. Miami (OH)*	Rubber Bowl; Akron, OH	L 7–35	14,118	
October 11	at Wooster	Wooster, OH	L 6–13		
October 18	Kalamazoo*^{†}	Memorial Stadium; Kent, OH	W 13–0	6,000	
October 25	at Bowling Green*	Bowling Green, OH (rivalry)	L 18–21		
November 1	John Carroll	Memorial Stadium; Kent, OH	W 26–7	6,000	
November 14	Akron	Memorial Stadium; Kent, OH (Wagon Wheel)	W 6–0	15,000	
November 21	at Youngstown*	Youngstown, OH	L 0–13	14,000	
*Non-conference game; ^{†}Homecoming
