= 1947 Dayton Flyers football team =

American college football season

1947 Dayton Flyers football
- Conference: Independent
- Record: 6–3
- Head coach: Joe Gavin (1st season)
- Home stadium: Dayton Stadium

1947 Midwestern non-major college football independents records
	Conf.			Overall
Team	W	L	T	W		L		T
Youngstown		–		8	–	2	–	0
Ball State		–		5	–	1	–	2
Ohio Wesleyan		–		6	–	2	–	1
Wayne		–		5	–	2	–	0
Dayton		–		6	–	3	–	0
Washington University		–		5	–	3	–	0
Bowling Green		–		5	–	5	–	0
Michigan Tech		–		3	–	3	–	1
Xavier		–		4	–	4	–	1
Central Michigan		–		2	–	5	–	1
Valparaiso		–		2	–	5	–	1
Michigan State Normal		–		1	–	6	–	0

The 1947 Dayton Flyers football team was an American football team that represented the University of Dayton as an independent during the 1947 college football season. In its first season under head coach Joe Gavin, the team compiled a 6–3 record and outscored opponents by a total of 163 to 103. Dick Dahn was the team captain.

Dayton was ranked at No. 77 (out of 500 college football teams) in the final Litkenhous Ratings for 1947.

== Schedule ==
Date	Opponent	Site	Result	Attendance	Source
September 27	Scranton	Dayton Stadium; Dayton, OH	W 28–6	8,000	
October 4	Bowling Green	Dayton Stadium; Dayton, OH	W 20–13	7,500	
October 11	at Cincinnati	Nippert Stadium; Cincinnati, OH	W 26–21	24,000	
October 18	Toledo	Dayton Stadium; Dayton, OH	L 13–14		
October 25	at Chattanooga	Chamberlain Field; Chattanooga, TN	L 13–19	6,000	
November 1	Xavier	Dayton Stadium; Dayton, OH	W 38–6	12,000	
November 8	at Miami (OH)	Miami Field; Oxford, OH	L 0–12	11,421	
November 15	at Ohio	Peden Stadium; Athens, OH	W 18–6	6,000	
November 22	St. Bonaventure	Dayton Stadium; Dayton, OH	W 7–6		
