= 1947 North Dakota Fighting Sioux football team =

American college football season

1947 North Dakota Fighting Sioux football
- Conference: North Central Conference
- Record: 4–4 (2–2 NCC)
- Head coach: Red Jarrett (3rd season)
- Home stadium: Memorial Stadium

1947 North Central Conference football standings
	Conf.					Overall
Team	W		L		T	W		L		T
South Dakota +	4	–	0	–	0	7	–	2	–	0
Iowa State Teachers +	4	–	0	–	0	5	–	3	–	1
South Dakota State	3	–	1	–	0	4	–	5	–	0
North Dakota	2	–	2	–	0	4	–	4	–	0
Augustana (SD)	2	–	3	–	0	3	–	5	–	0
Morningside	0	–	4	–	0	4	–	4	–	0
North Dakota State	0	–	5	–	0	1	–	7	–	0
+ – Conference co-champions

The 1947 North Dakota Fighting Sioux football team was an American football team that represented University of North Dakota in North Central Conference (NCC) during the 1947 college football season. In its third season under head coach Red Jarrett, the team compiled a 4–4 record (2–2 against NCC opponents), finished in fourth place in the NCC, and was outscored by a total of 128 to 126.

In the final Litkenhous Ratings released in mid-December, North Dakota was ranked at No. 275 out of 500 college football teams.

The team played its home games at Memorial Stadium in Grand Forks, North Dakota.

== Schedule ==
Date	Opponent	Site	Result	Attendance	Source
September 12	at Oklahoma City*	Taft Stadium; Oklahoma City, OK	L 7–20		
September 14	Luther*	Memorial Stadium; Grand Forks, ND	W 14–0		
September 27	at Iowa State Teachers	Cedar Falls, IA	L 0–20	3,500	
October 4	at Augustana (SD)	Sioux Falls, SD	W 13–7		
October 11	Manitoba*	Memorial Stadium; Grand Forks, ND	W 47–0		
October 18	at North Dakota State	Fargo, ND	W 25–20	5,000-6,000	
October 25	Bradley*	Memorial Stadium; Grand Forks, ND	L 15–39		
November 1	at South Dakota	Inman Field; Vermillion, SD (rivalry)	L 7–20		
*Non-conference game
