= 1947 New Hampshire Wildcats football team =

American college football season

1947 New Hampshire Wildcats football
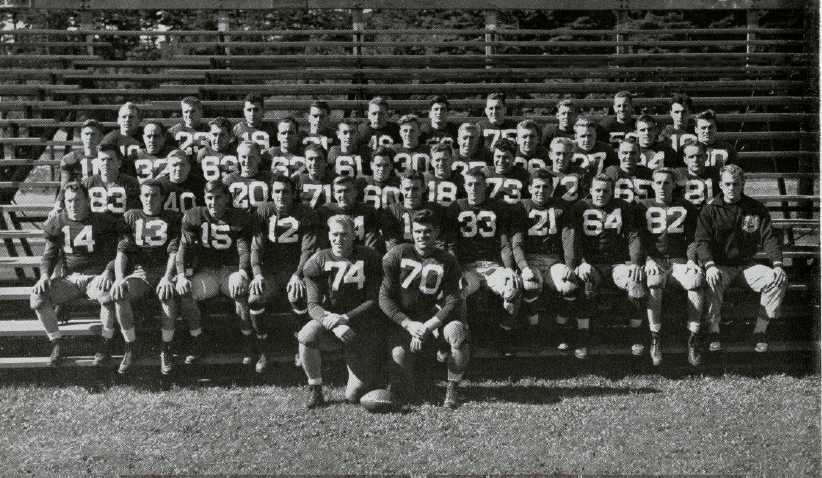

Yankee Conference champion

Glass Bowl, L 14–20 vs. Toledo
- Conference: Yankee Conference
- Record: 8–1 (4–0 Yankee)
- Head coach: Bill Glassford (2nd season)
- Offensive scheme: T formation
- Captain: Clayton Lane & Ernie Rainey
- Home stadium: Lewis Field

1947 Yankee Conference football standings
	Conf.					Overall
Team	W		L		T	W		L		T
New Hampshire $	4	–	0	–	0	8	–	1	–	0
Maine	2	–	1	–	0	6	–	1	–	0
Connecticut	1	–	2	–	0	2	–	4	–	0
Rhode Island State	1	–	3	–	0	3	–	4	–	0
Massachusetts	0	–	1	–	1	3	–	4	–	1
Vermont	0	–	1	–	1	3	–	4	–	1
$ – Conference champion

The 1947 New Hampshire Wildcats football team was an American football team that represented the University of New Hampshire as a member of the Yankee Conference during the 1947 college football season. In its second year under head coach Bill Glassford, the team compiled an 8–1 record (4–0 against conference opponents), won the Yankee Conference championship, and outscored opponents by a total of 255 to 59. The team's only loss was to the Toledo Rockets in the second annual Glass Bowl game.

In the final Litkenhous Ratings released in mid-December, New Hampshire was ranked at No. 125 out of 500 college football teams.

This was the inaugural season of competition in the Yankee Conference, which had been formed in December 1946. Quarterback Bruce Mather led the team on offense, which used a T formation scheme. Mather, back Carmen Ragonese, and tackle Clayton Lane were each selected in the 1948 NFL draft. Ragonese, Mather, co-captain Ernest Rainey, and co-captain Lane were each inducted to the university's athletic hall of fame in 1982, 1984, 1986, and 1988, respectively; the 1947 team was inducted as a whole in 2001.

The team played its home games at Lewis Field (also known as Lewis Stadium) in Durham, New Hampshire.

== Schedule ==
Date	Opponent	Site	Result	Attendance	Source
September 27	Colby*	Lewis Stadium; Durham, NH	W 28–0	6,500	
October 4	at Rhode Island State	Meade Field; Kingston, RI	W 33–7	3,000	
October 11	Maine^{†}	Lewis Stadium; Durham, NH (rivalry)	W 28–7	7,500	
October 18	at Springfield*	Pratt Field; Springfield, MA	W 21–7		
October 25	Vermont	Lewis Stadium; Durham, NH	W 28–6	5,000	
November 1	at Northeastern*	Huntington Field; Brookline, MA	W 55–6	3,000	
November 8	Tufts*	Lewis Stadium; Durham, NH	W 34–0	8,000	
November 15	at Connecticut	Gardner Dow Field; Storrs, CT	W 14–6	5,500	
December 6	at Toledo*	Glass Bowl; Toledo, OH (Glass Bowl)	L 14–20	13,500	
*Non-conference game; ^{†}Homecoming; Source:

Wildcat co-captain Clayton Lane went on to play in one professional football game, with the New York Yankees of the All-America Football Conference in 1948. He later was a civil engineer in the United States Army Corps of Engineers for 32 years; he died in January 2000 at age 77. Co-captain Ernie Rainey became a salesman and later vice president of sales for Stihl chainsaws; he died in November 2011 at age 89.
