= 1947 Bowling Green Falcons football team =

American college football season

1947 Bowling Green Falcons football
- Conference: Independent
- Record: 5–5
- Head coach: Robert Whittaker (7th season)
- Home stadium: University Stadium

1947 Midwestern non-major college football independents records
	Conf.			Overall
Team	W	L	T	W		L		T
Youngstown		–		8	–	2	–	0
Ball State		–		5	–	1	–	2
Ohio Wesleyan		–		6	–	2	–	1
Wayne		–		5	–	2	–	0
Dayton		–		6	–	3	–	0
Washington University		–		5	–	3	–	0
Bowling Green		–		5	–	5	–	0
Michigan Tech		–		3	–	3	–	1
Xavier		–		4	–	4	–	1
Central Michigan		–		2	–	5	–	1
Valparaiso		–		2	–	5	–	1
Michigan State Normal		–		1	–	6	–	0

The 1947 Bowling Green Falcons football team was an American football team that represented Bowling Green State University as an independent during the 1947 college football season. In its seventh season under head coach Robert Whittaker, the team compiled a 5–5 record and was outscored by a total of 149 to 134. Wayne Bloker and James Knierim were the team captains.

Bowling Green was ranked at No. 116 (out of 500 college football teams) in the final Litkenhous Ratings for 1947.

The team played its home games at University Stadium in Bowling Green, Ohio.

== Schedule ==
Date	Opponent	Site	Result	Attendance	Source
September 20	at Xavier	Xavier Stadium; Cincinnati, OH	L 0–2	15,000	
September 27	Central Michigan	University Stadium; Bowling Green, OH	W 20–19		
October 4	at Dayton	Dayton Stadium; Dayton, OH	L 13–20	7,500	
October 11	at Miami (OH)	Miami Field; Oxford, OH	L 19–33	9,000	
October 18	Ohio	University Stadium; Bowling Green, OH	W 2–0		
October 25	Kent State	University Stadium; Bowling Green, OH (rivalry)	W 21–18		
November 1	Findlay	University Stadium; Bowling Green, OH	W 26–9		
November 8	at St. Bonaventure	Forness Stadium; Olean, NY	L 14–21	6,500	
November 15	Iowa State Teachers	University Stadium; Bowling Green, OH	W 19–7	2,000	
November 22	at William & Mary	Cary Field; Williamsburg, VA	L 0–20	2,000	
