= 1947 Central Michigan Chippewas football team =

American college football season

1947 Central Michigan Chippewas football
- Conference: Independent
- Record: 2–5–1
- Head coach: Lyle Bennett (1st season)
- Home stadium: Alumni Field

1947 Midwestern non-major college football independents records
	Conf.			Overall
Team	W	L	T	W		L		T
Youngstown		–		8	–	2	–	0
Ball State		–		5	–	1	–	2
Ohio Wesleyan		–		6	–	2	–	1
Wayne		–		5	–	2	–	0
Dayton		–		6	–	3	–	0
Washington University		–		5	–	3	–	0
Bowling Green		–		5	–	5	–	0
Michigan Tech		–		3	–	3	–	1
Xavier		–		4	–	4	–	1
Central Michigan		–		2	–	5	–	1
Valparaiso		–		2	–	5	–	1
Michigan State Normal		–		1	–	6	–	0

The 1947 Central Michigan Chippewas football team represented Central Michigan College of Education, later renamed Central Michigan University, as an independent during the 1947 college football season. In their first season under head coach Lyle Bennett, the Chippewas compiled a 2–5–1 record and were outscored by their opponents by a combined total of 136 to 105. The team opened its season with a 34–14 loss to the Detroit Titans on September 19, 1947. The highlights of the season were shutout victories over Northern Michigan (45–0) on October 17, 1947, and Michigan State Normal (33–0) on November 1, 1947.

Lyle Bennett was hired as the school's head football coach on January 22, 1947, following the elevation of Ron Finch to be head of the school's department of health and education. An alumnus of Central Michigan, Bennett had worked as a trainer for the Michigan Wolverines men's track and field team before accepting a position as an assistant football coach at Central Michigan in 1946.

In the final Litkenhous Ratings released in mid-December, Central Michigan was ranked at No. 152 out of 500 college football teams.

== Schedule ==
Date	Opponent	Site	Result	Attendance	Source
September 19	at Detroit	University of Detroit Stadium; Detroit, MI	L 14–34	20,450	
September 27	at Bowling Green	Bowling Green, OH	L 19–20		
October 3	at Northern Illinois	DeKalb H.S. field; DeKalb, IL	T 6–6	2,500	
October 11	Western Michigan	Alumni Field; Mount Pleasant, MI (rivalry)	L 12–20		
October 17	Northern Michigan	Alumni Field; Mount Pleasant, MI	W 45–0		
October 24	at Youngstown	Rayen H.S. Stadium; Youngstown, OH	L 7–13	11,000	
November 1	Michigan State Normal^{†}	Alumni Field; Mount Pleasant, MI (rivalry)	W 33–0		
November 15	at Milwaukee State	Milwaukee, WI	L 0–12		
^{†}Homecoming
