= 1947 Youngstown Penguins football team =

American college football season

1947 Youngstown Penguins football
- Conference: Independent
- Record: 8–2
- Head coach: Dike Beede (9th season)
- Home stadium: Rayen Stadium

1947 Midwestern non-major college football independents records
	Conf.			Overall
Team	W	L	T	W		L		T
Youngstown		–		8	–	2	–	0
Ball State		–		5	–	1	–	2
Ohio Wesleyan		–		6	–	2	–	1
Wayne		–		5	–	2	–	0
Dayton		–		6	–	3	–	0
Washington University		–		5	–	3	–	0
Bowling Green		–		5	–	5	–	0
Michigan Tech		–		3	–	3	–	1
Xavier		–		4	–	4	–	1
Central Michigan		–		2	–	5	–	1
Valparaiso		–		2	–	5	–	1
Michigan State Normal		–		1	–	6	–	0

The 1947 Youngstown Penguins football team was an American football team that represented Youngstown College (now known as Youngstown State University) as an independent during the 1947 college football season. In its ninth season under head coach Dike Beede, the team compiled an 8–2 record.

Youngstown was ranked at No. 106 (out of 500 college football teams) in the final Litkenhous Ratings for 1947.

The team played its home games at Rayen Stadium.

== Schedule ==
Date	Opponent	Site	Result	Attendance	Source
September 20	Canisius	Rayen Stadium; Youngstown, OH	W 12–6		
September 27	Baldwin–Wallace	Rayen Stadium; Youngstown, OH	W 26–6		
October 4	at Geneva	Beaver Falls, PA	W 27–7		
October 11	at Toledo	Toledo, OH	L 7–21	9,000	
October 18	at Scranton	Scranton, PA	L 6–19	3,000	
October 24	Central Michigan	Rayen Stadium; Youngstown, OH	W 13–7	11,000	
November 1	Oklahoma City	Rayen Stadium; Youngstown, OH	W 19–13	14,000	
November 7	at Saint Vincent	Bearcat Stadium; Latrobe, PA	W 19–0		
November 14	John Carroll	Rayen Stadium; Youngstown, OH	W 13–2		
November 21	Kent State	Rayen Stadium; Youngstown, OH	W 13–0	14,000	
