= 1947 Denison Big Red football team =

College football season

1947 Denison Big Red football
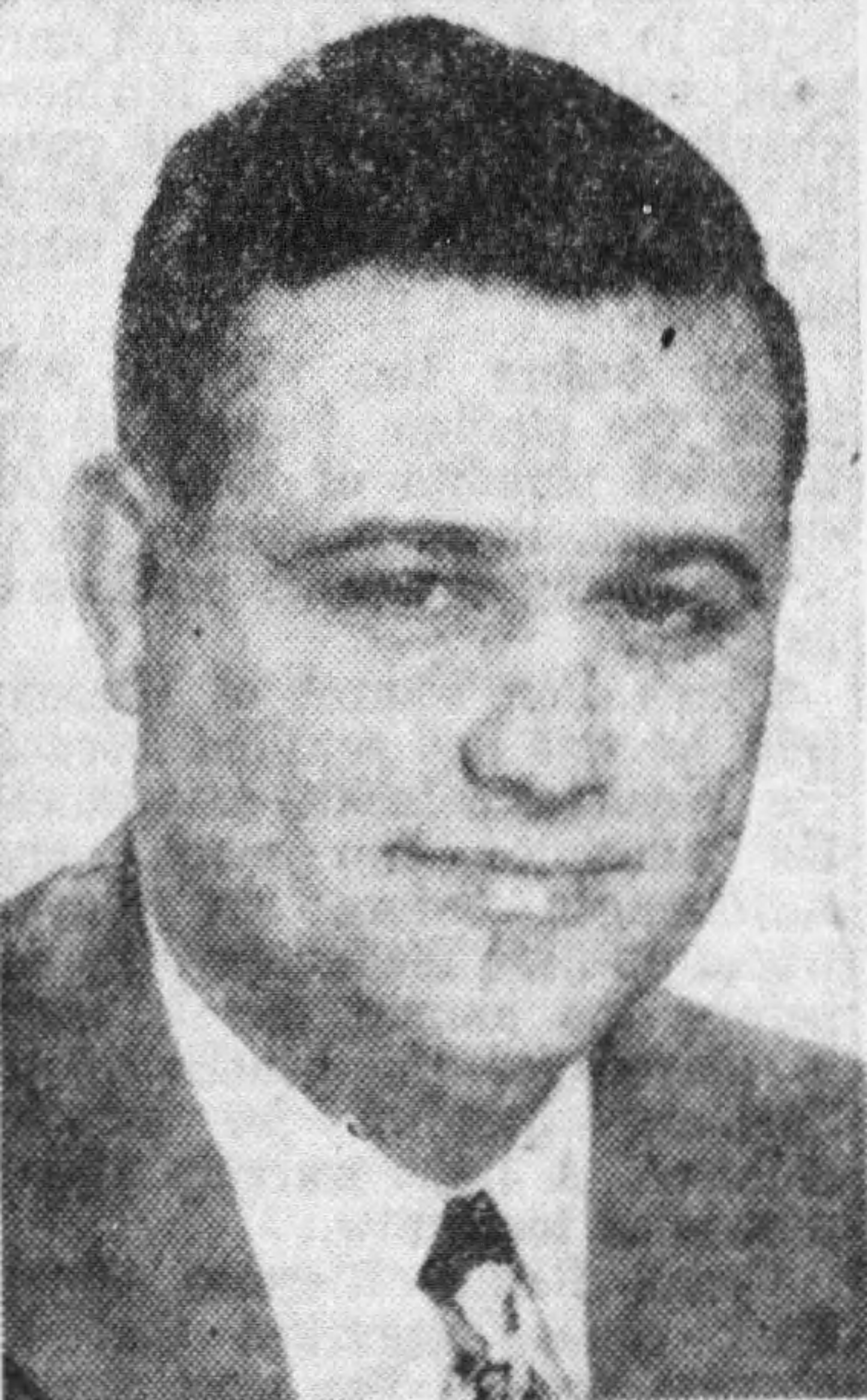
- Head coach Woody Hayes, 1947

OAC champion
- Conference: Ohio Athletic Conference
- Record: 9–0 (6–0 OAC)
- Head coach: Woody Hayes (2nd season)
- Captain: Walter Cheslock
- Home stadium: Deeds Field

1947 Ohio Athletic Conference football standings
| | Conf. | | | | | Overall |
| Team | W | | L | | T | W | | L | | T |
|---|---|---|---|---|---|---|---|---|---|---|
| Denison $ | 6 | – | 0 | – | 0 | 9 | – | 0 | – | 0 |
| Findlay | 4 | – | 0 | – | 0 | 9 | – | 1 | – | 0 |
| Heidelberg | 6 | – | 1 | – | 0 | 7 | – | 1 | – | 0 |
| John Carroll | 5 | – | 1 | – | 0 | 6 | – | 3 | – | 0 |
| Toledo | 3 | – | 1 | – | 0 | 9 | – | 2 | – | 0 |
| Kent State | 3 | – | 1 | – | 0 | 4 | – | 4 | – | 0 |
| Baldwin–Wallace | 4 | – | 2 | – | 0 | 5 | – | 4 | – | 0 |
| Ohio Wesleyan | 4 | – | 2 | – | 0 | 6 | – | 2 | – | 1 |
| Wittenberg | 4 | – | 4 | – | 0 | 4 | – | 5 | – | 0 |
| Muskingum | 3 | – | 3 | – | 0 | 5 | – | 3 | – | 0 |
| Kenyon | 1 | – | 1 | – | 0 | 3 | – | 4 | – | 0 |
| Wooster | 4 | – | 5 | – | 0 | 4 | – | 5 | – | 0 |
| Mount Union | 3 | – | 4 | – | 0 | 5 | – | 4 | – | 0 |
| Ohio Northern | 2 | – | 4 | – | 0 | 2 | – | 5 | – | 1 |
| Oberlin | 1 | – | 2 | – | 0 | 3 | – | 4 | – | 1 |
| Wilmington (OH) | 1 | – | 2 | – | 0 | 2 | – | 6 | – | 0 |
| Akron | 2 | – | 5 | – | 0 | 2 | – | 6 | – | 0 |
| Ashland | 1 | – | 3 | – | 0 | 3 | – | 5 | – | 0 |
| Marietta | 1 | – | 3 | – | 0 | 2 | – | 5 | – | 0 |
| Otterbein | 1 | – | 4 | – | 0 | 2 | – | 6 | – | 1 |
| Capital | 1 | – | 6 | – | 0 | 2 | – | 6 | – | 1 |
| Case | 0 | – | 5 | – | 0 | 1 | – | 7 | – | 0 |
$ – Conference champion

The 1947 Denison Big Red football team was an American football team that represented Denison University as a member of the Ohio Athletic Conference (OAC) during the 1947 college football season. In their second year under head coach Woody Hayes, the Big Red compiled a 9–0 record (6–0 in conference games), won the OAC championship, and outscored opponents by 268 to 60. Of the 39 college football teams in Ohio, Denison was the only one in 1947 to compile a perfect season with no losses or ties. It was also the first perfect season in Denison football history. Hayes also led the 1948 Denison team to a perfect season before moving on to Miami (OH) and Ohio State.

Tackle Walter Cheslock was the team captain. Four Denison players were selected as first-team players on the 1947 All-Ohio Conference football team: Cheslock; halfback Ed Rupp; end Bill Hart; and center Bill Wehr. Halfback Gerald Gaynor was named to the second team Hart was selected as a first-team player on the 1947 Little All-America college football team, and Gaynor was selected to play in the Blue-Gray gridiron classic, the first Denison player to be so honored.

The team played its home games at Deeds Field in Granville, Ohio.

== Schedule ==
| Date | Opponent | Site | Result | Source |
|---|---|---|---|---|
| September 27 | Rio Grande* | Deeds Field; Granville, OH | W 38–0 | |
| October 4 | at Washington & Jefferson* | Washington, PA | W 20–14 | |
| October 11 | at Beloit* | Beloit, WI | W 50–7 | |
| October 18 | Wooster^{†} | Deeds Field; Granville, OH | W 21–0 | |
| October 25 | Oberlin | Deeds Field; Granville, OH | W 33–6 | |
| November 1 | at Muskingum | McConagha Stadium; New Concord, OH | W 20–14 | |
| November 8 | at Capital | Columbus, OH | W 56–7 | |
| November 16 | at Ohio Wesleyan | Delaware, OH | W 18–6 | |
| November 22 | Wittenberg | Deeds Field; Granville, OH | W 12–6 | |
*Non-conference game; ^{†}Homecoming

== Players ==
- Walter Cheslock, tackle and captain, New Philadelphia, Ohio
- Glenn Culp, quarterback, Youngstown, Ohio
- Norman Dellner, tackle, Chagrin Falls, Ohio
- William Hart, end, East Cleveland, Ohio
- Richard Huff, tackle, Dover, Ohio
- Bill Fleitz, fullback, Newark, Ohio
- Gerald Gaynor, halfback, Toledo, Ohio
- William Henderson, halfback, Culver, Indiana
- Richard Koster, end, Toledo, Ohio
- William G. Miller, guard, Dayton, Ohio
- Robert Phillips, quarterback, Dover, Ohio
- Eddie Rupp, halfback, Granville, Ohio
- Don C. Watkins, tackle, Granville, Ohio
- William Wehr, center, Barnesville, Ohio
