= 1947 Southern Illinois Maroons football team =

American college football season

1947 Southern Illinois Maroons football

IIAC champion

Corn Bowl, W 21–0 vs. North Central (IL)
- Conference: Illinois Intercollegiate Athletic Conference
- Record: 7–2–1 (3–0–1 IIAC)
- Head coach: Glenn Martin (8th season)
- Home stadium: McAndrew Stadium

1947 Illinois Intercollegiate Athletic Conference football standings
	Conf.					Overall
Team	W		L		T	W		L		T
Southern Illinois $	3	–	0	–	1	7	–	2	–	1
Northern Illinois State	2	–	1	–	1	4	–	3	–	3
Illinois State Normal	1	–	1	–	2	4	–	3	–	2
Eastern Illinois	2	–	2	–	0	2	–	6	–	0
Western Illinois	0	–	4	–	0	4	–	4	–	1
$ – Conference champion

The 1947 Southern Illinois Maroons football team was an American football team that represented Southern Illinois University (now known as Southern Illinois University Carbondale) in the Illinois Intercollegiate Athletic Conference (IIAC) during the 1947 college football season. Under eighth-year head coach Glenn Martin, the team compiled a 7–2–1 record.

In the final Litkenhous Ratings released in mid-December, Southern Illinois was ranked at No. 206 out of 500 college football teams.

The team played its home games at McAndrew Stadium in Carbondale, Illinois.

== Schedule ==
Date	Opponent	Site	Result	Attendance	Source
September 27	Scott Field*	McAndrew Stadium; Carbondale, IL	W 58–0		
October 4	Evansville*	McAndrew Stadium; Carbondale, IL	L 0–7		
October 11	at Indiana State*	Terre Haute, IN	L 6–21		
October 18	at Western Illinois	Morgan Field; Macomb, IL	W 7–0		
October 25	Northern Illinois State	McAndrew Stadium; Carbondale, IL	W 20–0		
November 1	at Arkansas State*	Kays Stadium; Jonesboro, AR	W 12–7		
November 8	at Illinois State Normal	McCormick Field; Normal, IL	T 6–6	600	
November 15	Eastern Illinois	McAndrew Stadium; Carbondale, IL	W 33–13		
November 22	at Southeast Missouri State*	Houck Stadium; Cape Girardeau, MO	W 20–13		
November 27	vs. North Central (IL)*	Fred Carlton Field; Normal, IL (Corn Bowl)	W 21–0	5,500	
*Non-conference game
