= Bob Hanlon =

American football player (1924–1995)

No. 17, 45
- Positions: Halfback, Defensive back

Personal information
- Born: August 24, 1924; Springfield, Ohio, U.S.
- Died: July 20, 1995 (aged 70); Oak Lawn, Illinois U.S.
- Listed height: 6 ft 1 in (1.85 m)
- Listed weight: 195 lb (88 kg)

Career information
- High school: Leo Catholic (Chicago, Illinois)
- College: Notre Dame (1943); Great Lakes Navy (1944); Jacksonville NAS (1945); Loras (1947)
- NFL draft: 1948: 14th round, 125th overall pick

Career history
- Chicago Cardinals (1948–1949); Pittsburgh Steelers (1949–1950); Green Bay Packers (1951)*
- * Offseason or practice squad member only

Awards and highlights
- National champion (1943); First-team Little All-American (1947)

Career NFL statistics
- Games played: 22
- Games started: 8
- Rushing yards: 24
- Receptions: 1
- Receiving yards: 4
- Return yards: 213
- Interceptions: 3
- Fumble recoveries: 2
- Stats at Pro Football Reference

Robert Seldon Hanlon (August 24, 1924 – July 20, 1995) was an American professional football halfback and defensive back for the Chicago Cardinals and Pittsburgh Steelers of the National Football League (NFL). He played college football for the Notre Dame Fighting Irish and Loras Duhawks.

== Early life ==
Hanlon was born on August 24, 1924, in Springfield, Ohio. He attended Leo Catholic High School in Chicago, Illinois.

== College career ==
Hanlon played college football for the Notre Dame Fighting Irish in 1943, Great Lakes Navy in 1944, Jacksonville Naval Air Station in 1945 and Loras Duhawks in 1947. As a freshman at Notre Dame, Hanlon ran for 142 yards in ten games at fullback and won a national championship with the team. While serving in the United States Navy, Hanlon played football for Great Lakes Navy and Jacksonville Naval Air Station.

After World War II ended, he returned to Notre Dame and took part in preseason scrimmage with the team. Before the season began, Hanlon suffered a deep thigh bruise and refused to practice while injured despite the coaches wanting him to. In 1947, he transferred to Loras College and played on the football team. Hanlon earned first-team Little All-America honors by the Associated Press (AP).

== Professional career ==
=== Chicago Cardinals ===
Hanlon was selected by the Chicago Cardinals in the 14th round, with the 125th overall pick, of the 1948 NFL draft. He officially signed with the team on February 28, 1948. Hanlon played in ten games, where he had 11 rushing yards, one interception and fumble recovery.

=== Pittsburgh Steelers ===
On September 23, 1949, the Pittsburgh Steelers acquired Hanlon from the Cardinals in exchange for a draft pick. In 12 games, he had 13 yards rushing, one catch for four yards, 213 return yards, three interceptions and a fumble recovery. On July 15, 1950, Hanlon was waived by the team. After initially planing to retire from football, he decided to return to the Steelers. On September 12, Hanlon was released.

=== Green Bay Packers ===
In 1951, Hanlon was signed by Green Bay Packers and took part in their training camp. On September 25, he was released by the team.

== Personal life ==
After retiring from professional football, Hanlon was the head coach of the Leo Catholic football team for eight years in the 1960s and also served as the athletic director. He taught physical education and health at the school. Hanlon died on July 20, 1995.
