= Newburg, West Virginia =

- Town
- Location of Newburg in Preston County, West Virginia.
- Coordinates: 39°23′15″N 79°51′4″W
- Country: United States
- State: West Virginia
- County: Preston
- Incorporated: 1868

Area
  - Total: 0.78 sq mi (2.03 km^{2})
  - Land: 0.78 sq mi (2.03 km^{2})
  - Water: 0 sq mi (0.00 km^{2})
- Elevation: 1,217 ft (371 m)

Population (2020)
  - Total: 259
  - Estimate (2021): 274
  - Density: 401.3/sq mi (154.93/km^{2})
- Time zone: UTC-5 (Eastern (EST))
  - Summer (DST): UTC-4 (EDT)
- ZIP code: 26410
- Area code: 304
- FIPS code: 54-58300
- GNIS feature ID: 1555213
- Website: townofnewburg.com

Newburg is a town in western Preston County, West Virginia, United States. The population was 275 at the 2020 census.

== History ==
The town was so named on account of it being the newest town on the railroad, according to local history.

== Geography ==
Newburg is located at 39°23′15″N 79°51′4″W (39.387585, -79.850993).

According to the United States Census Bureau, the town has a total area of 0.79 square miles (2.05 km^{2}), all land.

== Demographics ==
Historical population
| Census | Pop. | Note | %± |
|---|---|---|---|
| 1880 | 802 | | — |
| 1890 | 778 | | −3.0% |
| 1900 | 751 | | −3.5% |
| 1910 | 823 | | 9.6% |
| 1920 | 890 | | 8.1% |
| 1930 | 745 | | −16.3% |
| 1940 | 696 | | −6.6% |
| 1950 | 657 | | −5.6% |
| 1960 | 494 | | −24.8% |
| 1970 | 457 | | −7.5% |
| 1980 | 418 | | −8.5% |
| 1990 | 378 | | −9.6% |
| 2000 | 360 | | −4.8% |
| 2010 | 329 | | −8.6% |
| 2020 | 259 | | −21.3% |
| 2021 (est.) | 274 | ▲ | 5.8% |
U.S. Decennial Census

=== 2010 census ===
At the 2010 census, there were 329 people, 134 households and 101 families living in the town. The population density was 416.5 inhabitants per square mile (160.8/km^{2}). There were 155 housing units at an average density of 196.2 per square mile (75.8/km^{2}). The racial makeup of the town was 98.2% White, 0.3% African American, 0.9% Native American, 0.3% from other races, and 0.3% from two or more races. Hispanic or Latino of any race were 0.6% of the population.

There were 134 households, of which 31.3% had children under the age of 18 living with them, 59.0% were married couples living together, 10.4% had a female householder with no husband present, 6.0% had a male householder with no wife present, and 24.6% were non-families. 20.9% of all households were made up of individuals, and 8.9% had someone living alone who was 65 years of age or older. The average household size was 2.46 and the average family size was 2.80.

The median age in the town was 41.4 years. 19.1% of residents were under the age of 18; 10.1% were between the ages of 18 and 24; 25% were from 25 to 44; 27.4% were from 45 to 64; and 18.5% were 65 years of age or older. The gender makeup of the town was 51.1% male and 48.9% female.

=== 2000 census ===
At the 2000 census, there were 360 people, 131 households and 99 families living in the town. The population density was 456.9 per square mile (175.9/km^{2}). There were 155 housing units at an average density of 196.7 per square mile (75.8/km^{2}). The racial makeup of the town was 100.00% White. Hispanic or Latino of any race were 0.83% of the population.

There were 131 households, of which 42.0% had children under the age of 18 living with them, 57.3% were married couples living together, 13.7% had a female householder with no husband present, and 23.7% were non-families. 19.1% of all households were made up of individuals, and 11.5% had someone living alone who was 65 years of age or older. The average household size was 2.75 and the average family size was 3.13.

29.2% of the population were under the age of 18, 8.3% from 18 to 24, 28.6% from 25 to 44, 19.2% from 45 to 64, and 14.7% who were 65 years of age or older. The median age was 35 years. For every 100 females, there were 95.7 males. For every 100 females age 18 and over, there were 96.2 males.

The median household income was $24,063 and the median family income was $24,688. Males had a median income of $26,250 compared with $15,000 for females. The per capita income for the town was $9,952. About 28.6% of families and 27.7% of the population were below the poverty line, including 32.5% of those under age 18 and 12.5% of those age 65 or over.
