= 1947 South Dakota Coyotes football team =

American college football season

1947 South Dakota Coyotes football

NCC co-champion
- Conference: North Central Conference
- Record: 7–2 (4–0 NCC)
- Head coach: Harry Gamage (10th season)
- Home stadium: Inman Field

1947 North Central Conference football standings
	Conf.					Overall
Team	W		L		T	W		L		T
South Dakota +	4	–	0	–	0	7	–	2	–	0
Iowa State Teachers +	4	–	0	–	0	5	–	3	–	1
South Dakota State	3	–	1	–	0	4	–	5	–	0
North Dakota	2	–	2	–	0	4	–	4	–	0
Augustana (SD)	2	–	3	–	0	3	–	5	–	0
Morningside	0	–	4	–	0	4	–	4	–	0
North Dakota State	0	–	5	–	0	1	–	7	–	0
+ – Conference co-champions

The 1947 South Dakota Coyotes football team was an American football team that represented the University of South Dakota as a member of the North Central Conference (NCC) during the 1951 college football season. In their 10th season under head coach Harry Gamage, the Coyotes compiled a 7–2 record (4–0 against NCC opponents), tied for the NCC championship, and outscored opponents by a total of 164 to 152.

In the final Litkenhous Ratings released in mid-December, South Dakota was ranked at No. 211 out of 500 college football teams.

They played their home games at Inman Field in Vermillion, South Dakota.

== Schedule ==
Date	Opponent	Site	Result	Attendance	Source
September 20	Yankton*	Inman Field; Vermillion, SD	W 25–7		
September 27	at Marquette*	Marquette Stadium; Milwaukee, WI	L 6–33	12,000	
October 4	Parsons*	Inman Field; Vermillion, SD	W 33–7		
October 10	at North Dakota State	Fargo, ND	W 13–7		
October 18	Morningside	Inman Field; Vermillion, SD	W 21–19	7,500–8,000	
October 25	at South Dakota State	Brookings, SD (rivalry)	W 26–7	> 10,000	
November 1	North Dakota	Inman Field; Vermillion, SD (rivalry)	W 20–7		
November 8	at Bradley*	Peoria, IL	W 20–13		
November 14	at Pacific (CA)*	Baxter Stadium; Stockton, CA	L 0–52	8,000	
*Non-conference game
