= 1947 Little All-America college football team =

American college football all-star team

The 1947 Little All-America college football team is composed of college football players from small colleges and universities who were selected by the Associated Press (AP) as the best players at each position. For 1947, the AP selected first, second, and third teams.

== First-team ==
| Position | Player | Team |
|---|---|---|
| B | Eddie LeBaron | Pacific |
| B | Darwin Horn | Pepperdine |
| B | Harold Bell | Muhlenberg |
| B | Robert Hanlon | Loras |
| E | William Hart | Denison |
| E | Bill Iannicelli | Franklin & Marshall |
| T | Ken Hubbard | Wofford |
| T | Felton Whitlow | North Texas State |
| G | James Nelson | Missouri Valley |
| G | Arthur Oley | Randolph–Macon |
| C | Dan D'Andrea | Pacific Lutheran |

== Second-team ==
| Position | Player | Team |
|---|---|---|
| B | Ted Runner | Redlands |
| B | Reed Bell | Sewanee |
| B | James Batchelor | East Texas State |
| B | Carmen Ragonese | New Hampshire |
| E | Jay Smith | Mississippi Southern |
| E | James Burton | Wesleyan (CT) |
| T | Ray Yagiello | Catawba |
| T | Robert Hawkins | Evansville |
| G | Ben Coren | West Chester |
| G | Jack Ellison | Hardin–Simmons |
| C | Paul Dietzel | Miami (OH) |

== Third-team ==
| Position | Player | Team |
|---|---|---|
| B | Henry Will | Newberry |
| B | William Young | Hillsdale |
| B | Henry Dombowski | Maine |
| B | Phil Colella | St. Bonaventure |
| E | Jack Coleman | Louisville |
| E | Omer Jordan | West Texas State |
| T | Joe Lucas | St. Ambrose |
| T | Jerry Cady | Gustavus Adolphus |
| G | Mike Reed | Louisiana Tech |
| G | Ted Andrus | Southwestern Louisiana |
| C | Myron Carman | Toledo |

== See also ==
- 1947 College Football All-America Team
