= 1947 college football season =

American college football season

- First AP No. 1 of season: Notre Dame
- Number of bowls: 13
- Champion(s): Notre Dame (AP); Michigan (AP (special postseason poll) various others)
- Heisman: Johnny Lujack (quarterback, Notre Dame)

The 1947 college football season finished with Notre Dame, Michigan, and Penn State all unbeaten and untied, but the Fighting Irish of Notre Dame were the first place choice for 107 of the 142 voters in the final regular season AP poll in early December, and repeated as national champions. Michigan was selected for the top spot by six contemporary math systems.

Second-ranked Michigan met #8 USC in the Rose Bowl and won 49–0, while fourth-ranked Penn State was tied 13–13 by #3 SMU in the Cotton Bowl; Notre Dame didn't participate in the postseason for over four decades (until the 1969 season). A special post-bowl AP poll was conducted with Michigan and Notre Dame as the only options, and Michigan won by a vote of 226 to 119.

During the 20th century, the NCAA had no playoff for the college football teams that would later be described as "Division I-A". The NCAA did recognize a national champion based upon the final results of the Associated Press poll of sportswriters (the United Press Coaches Poll started in 1950). The extent of that recognition came in the form of acknowledgment in the annual NCAA Football Guide of the "unofficial" national champions.

== Conference and program changes ==
=== Conference changes ===
- Two conferences began play in 1947:
  - Mid-American Conference – an active NCAA Division I FBS conference; formed by five members from Indiana, Michigan, and Ohio.
  - Yankee Conference – an NCAA Division I–AA conference active through the 1997 season and one of the predecessors to the modern Colonial Athletic Association; formed by six members from around New England, many from the recently disbanded New England Conference.
- One conference played its final season in 1947:
  - Indiana Intercollegiate Conference – conference active in football since the 1923 season.

=== Membership changes ===
School	1946 Conference	1947 Conference
Butler Bulldogs	Indiana Intercollegiate Conference	MAC
Cincinnati Bearcats	Independent	MAC
Connecticut Huskies	New England	Yankee
Maine Black Bears	New England	Yankee
Massachusetts Redmen	Independent	Yankee
New Hampshire Wildcats	New England	Yankee
Ohio Bobcats	Independent	MAC
Rhode Island State Rams	New England	Yankee
Vermont Catamounts	Independent	Yankee
Western Reserve Red Cats	Independent	MAC

== Season chronology ==
=== September ===
The Associated Press did not poll the writers until after the games of October 4. Among the five teams that had been ranked highest in 1946 (Notre Dame, Army, Georgia, UCLA and Illinois), Georgia opened on September 20 with a 34–7 win over Southern Mississippi and UCLA hosted Iowa the following Friday and won 22–7. The next day, September 27, Army beat Villanova 13–0, Illinois beat Pittsburgh 14–0, and Georgia beat Tennessee 27–0.

=== October ===
On October 4 Notre Dame won at Pittsburgh 40–6. Army shut out visiting Colorado 47–0. Georgia beat Tulane in New Orleans, 20–0. UCLA lost at Northwestern 27–26. Illinois won at Iowa 35–12. When the first poll came out that Monday, Notre Dame was the favorite of a bare majority (52 of 103) of the voters, followed by No. 2 Michigan, No. 3 Texas, No. 4 Georgia Tech and No. 5 Army. Illinois was ranked 6th, Penn 7th, California 8th, Georgia 9th, and Vanderbilt 10th.

On October 11 No. 1 Notre Dame won at Purdue, 22–7. No. 2 Michigan beat Pittsburgh, 69–0. In Dallas, No. 3 Texas beat No. 15 Oklahoma 34–14. No. 4 Georgia Tech beat VMI, 20–0, for its third shutout in three starts. No. 5 Army and No. 6 Illinois met at Yankee Stadium in New York, and played to a 0–0 tie. In the next poll, Michigan and Notre Dame switched places at No. 1 and No. 2, while Texas stayed at No. 3. California, which won at Wisconsin 48–7, rose from eighth to fourth, with Georgia Tech falling to No. 5.

October 18 No. 1 Michigan won at Northwestern, 49–21. No. 2 Notre Dame shut out visiting Nebraska, 31–0. No. 3 Texas met Arkansas at a neutral location in Memphis, Tennessee, and won 21–6. No. 4 California beat Washington State, 21–6. No. 5 Georgia Tech defeated Auburn 27–7 to stay unbeaten, but was voted out of the Top Five. No. 6 Illinois, which beat No. 13 Minnesota 40–13, rose to fifth.

October 25 No. 1 Michigan stayed unbeaten, with a 13–6 win over Minnesota, as did No. 2 Notre Dame, which defeated Iowa, 21–0. No. 3 Texas beat Rice, 12–0. No. 4 California lost to No. 10 USC, 39–14. No. 5 Illinois lost at Purdue, 14–7. No. 8 Penn beat Navy, 21–0. The Irish rose to No. 1 in the next poll, with a 78–69 lead in votes over No. 2 Michigan. They were followed by No. 3 Texas, No. 4 Penn, and No. 5 USC.

=== November ===
November 1 No. 1 Notre Dame and Navy met in Cleveland, with the Fighting Irish registering their third straight shutout, 27–0. No. 2 Michigan won at No. 11 Illinois, 14–7. In Dallas, No. 3 Texas (6–0–0) faced unbeaten (5–0–0) No. 8 Southern Methodist University, and the SMU Mustangs won 14–13. No. 4 Pennsylvania won at Princeton, 26–7, to stay unbeaten. In Seattle, No. 5 USC beat Washington 19–0. SMU and Texas exchanged places at No. 3 and No. 8, with the other top teams remaining the same.

November 8 No. 1 Notre Dame hosted No. 9 Army and won 27–7. No. 2 Michigan beat Indiana 35–0. No. 3 SMU won at Texas A&M, 13–0. No. 4 Pennsylvania beat No. 10 Virginia, 19–7, and moved up to No. 3 with SMU down to fourth. No. 5 USC beat Stanford, 14–0.

November 15 No. 1 Notre Dame had more points scored against it than at any other time in the season, but won at unranked Northwestern, 26–19. Meanwhile, No. 2 Michigan faced No. 9 Wisconsin in Madison and won 40–6, raising it back up to first place in the next poll. No. 3 Pennsylvania and No. 13 Army played to a 7–7 tie in Philadelphia. No. 4 SMU stayed unbeaten with a 14–6 win over Arkansas. No. 5 USC was idle. The next poll featured No. 1 Michigan, No. 2 Notre Dame, No. 3 SMU, No. 4 USC, and Penn State (which had just beaten Navy 20-7) at No. 5.

November 22 No. 1 Michigan closed its season at 9–0–0 with a 21–0 win over Ohio State, and accepted an invitation to meet No. 4 USC (which beat No. 18 UCLA 6–0) in the Rose Bowl. Meanwhile, No. 3 SMU won 10–0 at Baylor, and No. 5 Penn State won at Pitt, 29–0. Both unbeaten, they accepted invitations to the Cotton Bowl Classic. No. 2 Notre Dame thrashed Tulane, 59–6 and yet again switched places with Michigan in the rankings. The Irish were restored to the top spot by the AP voters, with 97 first place votes to Michigan's 81.

November 29 No. 1 Notre Dame, No. 2 Michigan, No. 4 USC, and No. 5 Penn State were idle. No. 3 SMU was tied in a game at TCU, 19–19, and fell to fourth with USC moving up to No. 3.

December 6 No. 1 Notre Dame (8–0–0) and No. 3 USC (7–0–1) met in Los Angeles, with the Irish cementing their hold on the No. 1 ranking, 38–7. No. 2 Michigan, No. 4 SMU and No. 5 Penn State had completed their regular seasons, with bowls to come. The final AP poll featured No. 1 Notre Dame, No. 2 Michigan, No. 3 SMU, No. 4 Penn State, and No. 5 Texas as the top teams.

== Conference standings ==
=== Major conference standings ===
1947 Big Nine Conference football standings
	Conf.					Overall
Team	W		L		T	W		L		T
No. 2 Michigan $	6	–	0	–	0	10	–	0	–	0
Wisconsin	3	–	2	–	1	5	–	3	–	1
Minnesota	3	–	3	–	0	6	–	3	–	0
Illinois	3	–	3	–	0	5	–	3	–	1
Purdue	3	–	3	–	0	5	–	4	–	0
Indiana	2	–	3	–	1	5	–	3	–	1
Iowa	2	–	3	–	1	3	–	5	–	1
Northwestern	2	–	4	–	0	3	–	6	–	0
Ohio State	1	–	4	–	1	2	–	6	–	1
$ – Conference champion; Rankings from AP Poll

1947 Big Six Conference football standings
	Conf.					Overall
Team	W		L		T	W		L		T
No. 12 Kansas +	4	–	0	–	1	8	–	1	–	2
No. 16 Oklahoma +	4	–	0	–	1	7	–	2	–	1
Missouri	3	–	2	–	0	6	–	4	–	0
Nebraska	2	–	3	–	0	2	–	7	–	0
Iowa State	1	–	4	–	0	3	–	6	–	0
Kansas State	0	–	5	–	0	0	–	10	–	0
+ – Conference co-champions; Rankings from AP Poll

1947 Border Conference football standings
	Conf.					Overall
Team	W		L		T	W		L		T
Texas Tech $	4	–	0	–	0	6	–	5	–	0
Hardin–Simmons	5	–	1	–	0	8	–	3	–	0
West Texas State	5	–	2	–	0	7	–	4	–	0
Arizona	3	–	2	–	0	5	–	4	–	1
Texas Mines	3	–	3	–	1	5	–	3	–	1
Arizona State	3	–	4	–	0	4	–	7	–	0
New Mexico	1	–	5	–	1	4	–	5	–	1
New Mexico A&M	1	–	4	–	0	3	–	6	–	0
Arizona State–Flagstaff	0	–	4	–	0	1	–	7	–	0
$ – Conference champion

1947 Ivy Group football standings
	Conf.					Overall
Team	W		L		T	W		L		T
No. 7 Penn	4	–	0	–	0	7	–	0	–	1
Princeton	4	–	2	–	0	5	–	3	–	0
Yale	3	–	2	–	0	6	–	3	–	0
No. 20 Columbia	2	–	2	–	0	7	–	2	–	0
Harvard	1	–	3	–	0	4	–	5	–	0
Brown	1	–	3	–	0	4	–	4	–	1
Dartmouth	3	–	4	–	0	4	–	4	–	1
Cornell	1	–	4	–	0	4	–	5	–	0
Rankings from AP Poll

1947 Missouri Valley Conference football standings
	Conf.					Overall
Team	W		L		T	W		L		T
Tulsa $	3	–	0	–	0	5	–	5	–	0
Wichita	2	–	1	–	0	7	–	4	–	0
Saint Louis	1	–	1	–	0	4	–	6	–	0
Drake	1	–	3	–	0	1	–	7	–	1
Oklahoma A&M	0	–	2	–	0	3	–	7	–	0
$ – Conference champion

1947 Mountain States Conference football standings
	Conf.					Overall
Team	W		L		T	W		L		T
Utah $	6	–	0	–	0	8	–	1	–	1
Denver	3	–	2	–	1	5	–	4	–	1
Utah State	3	–	3	–	0	6	–	5	–	0
Colorado	3	–	3	–	0	4	–	5	–	0
Colorado A&M	2	–	3	–	1	5	–	4	–	1
Wyoming	2	–	4	–	0	4	–	5	–	0
BYU	1	–	5	–	0	3	–	7	–	0
$ – Conference champion

1947 Pacific Coast Conference football standings
	Conf.					Overall
Team	W		L		T	W		L		T
No. 8 USC $	6	–	0	–	0	7	–	2	–	1
No. 15 California	5	–	1	–	0	9	–	1	–	0
Oregon	5	–	1	–	0	7	–	3	–	0
UCLA	4	–	2	–	0	5	–	4	–	0
Montana	2	–	1	–	0	7	–	4	–	0
Oregon State	3	–	4	–	0	5	–	5	–	0
Washington	2	–	5	–	0	3	–	6	–	0
Washington State	2	–	5	–	0	3	–	7	–	0
Idaho	1	–	4	–	0	4	–	4	–	0
Stanford	0	–	7	–	0	0	–	9	–	0
$ – Conference champion; Rankings from AP Poll

1947 Southeastern Conference football standings
	Conf.					Overall
Team	W		L		T	W		L		T
No. 13 Ole Miss $	6	–	1	–	0	9	–	2	–	0
No. 10 Georgia Tech	4	–	1	–	0	10	–	1	–	0
No. 6 Alabama	5	–	2	–	0	8	–	3	–	0
Mississippi State	2	–	2	–	0	7	–	3	–	0
Georgia	3	–	3	–	0	7	–	4	–	1
Vanderbilt	3	–	3	–	0	6	–	4	–	0
Tulane	2	–	3	–	2	2	–	5	–	2
LSU	2	–	3	–	1	5	–	3	–	1
Kentucky	2	–	3	–	0	8	–	3	–	0
Tennessee	2	–	3	–	0	5	–	5	–	0
Auburn	1	–	5	–	0	2	–	7	–	0
Florida	0	–	3	–	1	4	–	5	–	1
$ – Conference champion; Rankings from AP Poll

1947 Southern Conference football standings
	Conf.					Overall
Team	W		L		T	W		L		T
No. 14 William & Mary $	7	–	1	–	0	9	–	2	–	0
No. 9 North Carolina	4	–	1	–	0	8	–	2	–	0
South Carolina	4	–	1	–	1	6	–	2	–	1
No. 19 Duke	3	–	1	–	1	4	–	3	–	2
Washington and Lee	3	–	2	–	0	5	–	5	–	0
Maryland	3	–	2	–	1	7	–	2	–	2
No. 17 NC State	3	–	2	–	1	5	–	3	–	1
VPI	4	–	3	–	0	4	–	5	–	0
Davidson	3	–	3	–	1	6	–	3	–	1
Wake Forest	3	–	4	–	0	6	–	4	–	0
VMI	2	–	3	–	1	3	–	5	–	1
Clemson	1	–	3	–	0	4	–	5	–	0
The Citadel	1	–	4	–	0	3	–	5	–	0
Furman	1	–	4	–	0	2	–	7	–	0
Richmond	1	–	5	–	0	3	–	7	–	0
George Washington	0	–	4	–	0	1	–	7	–	1
$ – Conference champion; Rankings from AP Poll

1947 Southwest Conference football standings
	Conf.					Overall
Team	W		L		T	W		L		T
No. 3 SMU $	5	–	0	–	1	9	–	0	–	2
No. 5 Texas	5	–	1	–	0	10	–	1	–	0
No. 18 Rice	4	–	2	–	0	6	–	3	–	1
TCU	2	–	3	–	1	4	–	5	–	2
Arkansas	1	–	4	–	1	6	–	4	–	1
Texas A&M	1	–	4	–	1	3	–	6	–	1
Baylor	1	–	5	–	0	5	–	5	–	0
$ – Conference champion; Rankings from AP Poll

=== Major independents ===
1947 Eastern major college football independents records
	Conf.			Overall
Team	W	L	T	W		L		T
No. 4 Penn State		–		9	–	0	–	1
No. 11 Army		–		5	–	2	–	2
Villanova		–		6	–	3	–	1
Boston University		–		5	–	3	–	0
Boston College		–		5	–	4	–	0
Holy Cross		–		4	–	4	–	2
Syracuse		–		3	–	6	–	0
Temple		–		3	–	6	–	0
NYU		–		2	–	5	–	1
Colgate		–		1	–	5	–	2
Duquesne		–		2	–	8	–	0
Fordham		–		1	–	6	–	1
Merchant Marine		–		2	–	9	–	0
Pittsburgh		–		1	–	8	–	0
Rankings from AP Poll

1947 Midwestern major college football independents records
	Conf.			Overall
Team	W	L	T	W		L		T
No. 1 Notre Dame		–		9	–	0	–	0
Michigan State		–		7	–	2	–	0
Detroit		–		6	–	4	–	0
Marquette		–		4	–	5	–	0
Rankings from AP Poll

1947 Southern major college football independents records
	Conf.			Overall
Team	W	L	T	W		L		T
Virginia		–		7	–	3	–	0
West Virginia		–		6	–	4	–	0
Georgetown		–		3	–	4	–	1
Chattanooga		–		4	–	6	–	0
Miami (FL)		–		2	–	7	–	0
Navy		–		1	–	7	–	1

1947 Western major college football independents records
	Conf.			Overall
Team	W	L	T	W		L		T
Nevada		–		7	–	2	–	0
San Francisco		–		7	–	3	–	0
Santa Clara		–		4	–	4	–	0
Saint Mary's		–		3	–	7	–	0
Portland		–		1	–	7	–	0

=== Minor conferences ===
Conference	Champion(s)	Record
Alabama Intercollegiate Conference	Jacksonville State	9–0
California Collegiate Athletic Association	Pacific (CA)	5–0
Central Intercollegiate Athletics Association	Shaw	6–0
Central Intercollegiate Athletic Conference	Kansas State Teachers	4–0–1
College Conference of Illinois	North Central (IL)	5–1
Dakota-Iowa Athletic Conference	Buena Vista; Westmar	3–1–1
Far Western Conference	Northern Branch College of Agriculture; Southern Oregon College	3–1
Indiana Intercollegiate Conference	Butler	4–0–1
Iowa Intercollegiate Athletic Conference	Upper Iowa	5–0
Kansas Collegiate Athletic Conference	Ottawa (KS)	6–0
Louisiana Intercollegiate Conference	Louisiana Tech	5–0
Lone Star Conference	North Texas State Teachers	6–0
Michigan Intercollegiate Athletic Association	Kalamazoo; Hillsdale	3–0–2
Mid-American Conference	Cincinnati	3–1
Midwest Collegiate Athletic Conference	Lawrence	5–1
Minnesota Intercollegiate Athletic Conference	Macalester; Saint Thomas (MN)	4–0
Missouri Intercollegiate Athletic Association	Missouri School of Mines	4–1
Nebraska College Conference	Chadron State; Nebraska Wesleyan	5–1–1
New Mexico Intercollegiate Conference	Sul Ross	5–0
North Central Intercollegiate Athletic Conference	Iowa State Teachers (Northern Iowa); South Dakota	4–0
North Dakota College Athletic Conference	Valley City State	6–1
Ohio Athletic Conference	Denison	5–0
Oklahoma Collegiate Athletic Conference	Southeastern State College (OK)	5–0
Pacific Northwest Conference	Willamette	6–0
Pennsylvania State Athletic Conference	Lock Haven State Teachers; Mansfield State Teachers	5–1–1; 4–1–1
Rocky Mountain Athletic Conference	Montana State College	1–0
South Dakota Intercollegiate Conference	Northern State Teachers (SD)	2–0
Southern California Intercollegiate Athletic Conference	Redlands	4–0
Southern Intercollegiate Athletic Conference	Florida A&M College	5–0
Southwestern Athletic Conference	Southern	7–0
State Teacher's College Conference of Minnesota	Bemidji State Teachers; Moorhead State Teachers; Winona State Teachers	3–1
Texas Collegiate Athletic Conference	Hardin–Simmons; McMurry (TX)	4–1
Washington Intercollegiate Conference	Eastern Washington College; Pacific Lutheran	4–1
Wisconsin State Teachers College Conference	North: River Falls State Teachers; South: Milwaukee State Teachers	4–0; 4–0

=== Minor conference standings ===
1947 Badger State Conference football standings
	Conf.					Overall
Team	W		L		T	W		L		T
Mission House +	3	–	1	–	0	6	–	2	–	0
Northwestern (WI) +	3	–	1	–	0	5	–	3	–	0
Milton	2	–	2	–	0	2	–	6	–	0
Wisconsin Tech	1	–	3	–	0	?	–	?	–	?
Wisconsin–Extension	1	–	3	–	0	2	–	5	–	0
+ – Conference co-champions; Northwestern forfeited to Wisconsin Tech.

1947 California Collegiate Athletic Association football standings
	Conf.					Overall
Team	W		L		T	W		L		T
Pacific (CA) $	5	–	0	–	0	10	–	1	–	0
San Jose State	3	–	2	–	0	9	–	3	–	0
Fresno State	2	–	1	–	2	3	–	6	–	2
San Diego State	2	–	2	–	1	7	–	3	–	1
Santa Barbara	1	–	3	–	1	4	–	3	–	1
Cal Poly	0	–	5	–	0	1	–	9	–	0
$ – Conference champion

1947 Central Intercollegiate Conference football standings
	Conf.					Overall
Team	W		L		T	W		L		T
Emporia State $	4	–	0	–	1	7	–	1	–	1
Washburn	4	–	1	–	0	7	–	1	–	0
Southwestern (KS)	2	–	2	–	1	6	–	2	–	1
Fort Hays State	2	–	2	–	1	5	–	3	–	1
Pittsburg State	1	–	3	–	1	2	–	7	–	1
St. Benedict's	0	–	5	–	0	1	–	8	–	0
$ – Conference champion

1947 College Conference of Illinois football standings
	Conf.					Overall
Team	W		L		T	W		L		T
North Central (IL) $	5	–	1	–	0	7	–	2	–	0
Wheaton (IL)	4	–	1	–	0	7	–	1	–	1
Augustana (IL)	3	–	1	–	1	4	–	2	–	2
Carthage	3	–	2	–	0	5	–	2	–	1
Lake Forest	2	–	2	–	1	3	–	4	–	1
Millikin	2	–	2	–	1	3	–	4	–	1
Illinois Wesleyan	2	–	2	–	1	3	–	5	–	1
Elmhurst	0	–	5	–	0	1	–	8	–	0
Illinois College	0	–	5	–	0	0	–	9	–	0
$ – Conference champion

1947 Colored Intercollegiate Athletic Association football standings
	Conf.					Overall
Team	W		L		T	W		L		T
No. 5 Shaw $	6	–	0	–	0	10	–	0	–	0
No. 7 Virginia State	7	–	1	–	0	8	–	1	–	0
No. 4 Hampton	5	–	1	–	1	7	–	2	–	1
No. 11 Howard	6	–	2	–	1	6	–	2	–	1
No. 9 Morgan State	5	–	2	–	1	5	–	2	–	1
No. 14 West Virginia State	4	–	1	–	1	6	–	3	–	1
No. 19 Lincoln (PA)	3	–	3	–	1	5	–	4	–	1
Delaware State	4	–	3	–	0	4	–	4	–	0
Virginia Union	3	–	5	–	0	4	–	5	–	0
Winston-Salem State	3	–	3	–	0	6	–	3	–	0
North Carolina A&T	1	–	5	–	1	1	–	5	–	1
North Carolina College	2	–	6	–	0	2	–	7	–	0
Bluefield State	1	–	5	–	0	3	–	6	–	0
Johnson C. Smith	1	–	7	–	0	1	–	8	–	0
Saint Paul's (VA)	0	–	5	–	1	0	–	5	–	1
St. Augustine's	0	–	2	–	1	3	–	4	–	1
$ – Conference champion; Conference standings were based on the Dickinson System.; Rankings from the Pittsburgh Courier using the Dickinson Ratings System.

1947 Dakota-Iowa Athletic Conference football standings
	Conf.					Overall
Team	W		L		T	W		L		T
Western Union +	3	–	1	–	1	3	–	2	–	2
Buena Vista +	3	–	1	–	1	3	–	5	–	1
Huron	3	–	2	–	0	4	–	3	–	0
Dakota Wesleyan	2	–	2	–	1	3	–	4	–	1
Yankton	1	–	2	–	2	1	–	4	–	2
Sioux Falls	0	–	4	–	1	2	–	5	–	1
+ – Conference co-champions

1947 Far Western Conference football standings
	Conf.					Overall
Team	W		L		T	W		L		T
Southern Oregon +	3	–	1	–	0	7	–	3	–	0
Cal Aggies +	3	–	1	–	0	4	–	5	–	0
Humboldt State	2	–	2	–	0	5	–	4	–	0
Chico State	1	–	3	–	0	4	–	5	–	0
San Francisco State	1	–	3	–	0	2	–	5	–	0
+ – Conference co-champions

1947 Hoosier Conference football standings
	Conf.					Overall
Team	W		L		T	W		L		T
Indiana Central $	6	–	1	–	0	7	–	1	–	0
Hanover	5	–	1	–	0	7	–	1	–	0
Franklin (IN)	5	–	1	–	0	6	–	2	–	0
Manchester (IN)	2	–	3	–	1	2	–	5	–	1
Earlham	2	–	3	–	0	3	–	5	–	0
Canterbury	1	–	4	–	0	1	–	6	–	1
Anderson (IN)	0	–	4	–	1	1	–	5	–	2
Rose Poly	0	–	4	–	0	0	–	7	–	1
$ – Conference champion

1947 Illinois Intercollegiate Athletic Conference football standings
	Conf.					Overall
Team	W		L		T	W		L		T
Southern Illinois $	3	–	0	–	1	7	–	2	–	1
Northern Illinois State	2	–	1	–	1	4	–	3	–	3
Illinois State Normal	1	–	1	–	2	4	–	3	–	2
Eastern Illinois	2	–	2	–	0	2	–	6	–	0
Western Illinois	0	–	4	–	0	4	–	4	–	1
$ – Conference champion

1947 Iowa Conference football standings
	Conf.					Overall
Team	W		L		T	W		L		T
Upper Iowa $	5	–	0	–	0	6	–	1	–	0
Loras *	2	–	0	–	0	9	–	0	–	0
Western Union *	1	–	0	–	0	3	–	2	–	2
Central (IA)	5	–	0	–	1	7	–	1	–	1
Dubuque	4	–	1	–	0	5	–	2	–	0
Simpson (IA)	2	–	1	–	2	3	–	4	–	2
Iowa Wesleyan	3	–	2	–	1	5	–	3	–	1
Wartburg	3	–	2	–	1	4	–	3	–	1
Parsons	2	–	4	–	0	2	–	6	–	0
St. Ambrose *	0	–	1	–	0	5	–	3	–	0
Luther	0	–	5	–	1	1	–	7	–	1
Buena Vista	0	–	5	–	0	3	–	5	–	1
William Penn	0	–	6	–	0	0	–	8	–	0
$ – Conference champion; * – ineligible for conference title

1947 Kansas Collegiate Athletic Conference football standings
	Conf.					Overall
Team	W		L		T	W		L		T
Ottawa $	6	–	0	–	0	6	–	2	–	1
Baker	4	–	1	–	1	5	–	3	–	1
Bethany (KS)	4	–	2	–	0	4	–	5	–	0
Kansas Wesleyan	3	–	2	–	1	4	–	4	–	1
Bethel (KS)	1	–	4	–	1	2	–	5	–	1
College of Emporia	1	–	4	–	1	2	–	6	–	1
McPherson	0	–	6	–	0	1	–	6	–	0
$ – Conference champion

1947 Louisiana Intercollegiate Conference football standings
	Conf.					Overall
Team	W		L		T	W		L		T
Louisiana Tech $	5	–	0	–	0	5	–	4	–	0
Southwestern Louisiana	4	–	1	–	0	6	–	2	–	0
Northwestern State	3	–	2	–	0	4	–	5	–	0
Southeastern Louisiana	2	–	3	–	0	3	–	5	–	1
Centenary	1	–	4	–	0	1	–	9	–	1
Louisiana College	0	–	4	–	0	1	–	5	–	1
$ – Conference champion

1947 Lone Star Conference football standings
	Conf.					Overall
Team	W		L		T	W		L		T
North Texas State $	6	–	0	–	0	10	–	2	–	0
East Texas State	4	–	2	–	0	8	–	2	–	0
Southwest Texas State	4	–	2	–	0	5	–	4	–	0
Trinity (TX)	3	–	2	–	1	5	–	3	–	2
Stephen F. Austin	2	–	3	–	1	3	–	6	–	1
Sam Houston State	1	–	5	–	0	3	–	6	–	0
Houston	0	–	6	–	0	3	–	8	–	0
$ – Conference champion

1947 Michigan Intercollegiate Athletic Association football standings
	Conf.					Overall
Team	W		L		T	W		L		T
Hillsdale +	3	–	0	–	2	7	–	0	–	2
Kalamazoo +	3	–	0	–	2	4	–	1	–	3
Hope	3	–	1	–	1	5	–	2	–	1
Alma	2	–	2	–	1	5	–	3	–	1
Adrian	1	–	4	–	0	3	–	5	–	0
Albion	0	–	5	–	0	0	–	8	–	0
+ – Conference co-champions

1947 Mid-American Conference football standings
	Conf.					Overall
Team	W		L		T	W		L		T
Cincinnati $	3	–	1	–	0	7	–	3	–	0
Western Reserve	2	–	1	–	0	4	–	5	–	0
Butler	1	–	3	–	0	5	–	3	–	1
Ohio	1	–	3	–	0	3	–	5	–	1
Miami (OH) *	2	–	0	–	0	9	–	0	–	1
Western Michigan *	0	–	1	–	0	5	–	4	–	0
$ – Conference champion; * – Miami and Western Michigan were not eligible to compete for the MAC championship because they did not schedule a full slate of games against MAC opponents.

1947 Midwest Athletic Association football standings
	Conf.					Overall
Team	W		L		T	W		L		T
No. 1 Tennessee A&I $	3	–	0	–	0	10	–	0	–	0
No. 2 Wilberforce State	3	–	1	–	0	11	–	1	–	0
No. 22 Kentucky State	3	–	2	–	0	4	–	6	–	0
No. 13 Lincoln (MO)	1	–	3	–	0	3	–	4	–	1
Philander Smith	0	–	2	–	0	1	–	9	–	1
Wilberforce	0	–	2	–	0	0	–	6	–	1
No. 12 Louisville Municipal *			–			6	–	1	–	1
$ – Conference champion; * – On probation; Rankings from the Pittsburgh Courier using the Dickinson Ratings System.

1947 Midwest Conference football standings
	Conf.					Overall
Team	W		L		T	W		L		T
Lawrence $	5	–	1	–	0	7	–	1	–	0
Cornell (IA)	4	–	2	–	1	6	–	2	–	1
Monmouth (IL)	3	–	2	–	0	5	–	2	–	1
Carleton	2	–	2	–	1	3	–	3	–	2
Knox	3	–	3	–	0	4	–	4	–	0
Beloit	3	–	3	–	0	4	–	5	–	0
Grinnell	3	–	3	–	0	3	–	5	–	0
Ripon	2	–	3	–	0	2	–	5	–	1
Coe	0	–	6	–	0	0	–	8	–	0
$ – Conference champion

1947 Minnesota Intercollegiate Athletic Conference football standings
	Conf.					Overall
Team	W		L		T	W		L		T
Macalester +	4	–	0	–	0	5	–	0	–	1
St. Thomas (MN) +	4	–	0	–	0	4	–	3	–	0
Gustavus Adolphus	4	–	1	–	0	7	–	1	–	1
St. Olaf	3	–	2	–	0	5	–	3	–	0
Saint John's (MN)	3	–	2	–	0	3	–	2	–	0
Hamline	2	–	3	–	0	3	–	5	–	0
Concordia (MN)	1	–	4	–	0	3	–	4	–	0
Saint Mary's (MN)	0	–	4	–	0	1	–	6	–	0
Augsburg	0	–	5	–	0	0	–	7	–	0
+ – Conference co-champions

1947 Missouri College Athletic Union football standings
	Conf.					Overall
Team	W		L		T	W		L		T
Missouri Valley $	4	–	0	–	0	12	–	0	–	0
Central (MO)	2	–	2	–	0	5	–	4	–	0
Culver–Stockton	2	–	2	–	0	4	–	4	–	0
William Jewell	2	–	2	–	0	3	–	6	–	1
Tarkio	0	–	4	–	0	3	–	5	–	0
$ – Conference champion

1947 Missouri Intercollegiate Athletic Association football standings
	Conf.					Overall
Team	W		L		T	W		L		T
Missouri Mines $	4	–	1	–	0	4	–	3	–	0
SW Missouri State	3	–	1	–	1	7	–	2	–	1
NW Missouri State	2	–	1	–	2	5	–	2	–	2
Kirksville State	2	–	3	–	0	5	–	3	–	1
SE Missouri State	1	–	3	–	1	2	–	6	–	1
Central Missouri State	1	–	4	–	0	2	–	7	–	0
$ – Conference champion

1947 Minnesota Teachers College Conference football standings
	Conf.					Overall
Team	W		L		T	W		L		T
Bemidji State +	3	–	1	–	0	4	–	3	–	0
Winona State +	3	–	1	–	0	4	–	3	–	1
Moorhead State	2	–	2	–	0	6	–	2	–	0
St. Cloud State	2	–	2	–	0	4	–	3	–	0
Duluth State	1	–	3	–	0	3	–	4	–	0
Mankato State	1	–	3	–	0	1	–	6	–	0
+ – Conference co-champions

1947 Montana Collegiate Conference football standings
	Conf.					Overall
Team	W		L		T	W		L		T
Montana Normal $	2	–	0	–	1	3	–	1	–	2
Eastern Montana	1	–	1	–	1	3	–	1	–	1
Carroll (MT)	1	–	2	–	0	2	–	4	–	0
Montana Mines	1	–	2	–	0	1	–	3	–	0
$ – Conference champion

1947 Nebraska College Conference football standings
	Conf.					Overall
Team	W		L		T	W		L		T
Chadron State +	5	–	1	–	1	7	–	1	–	1
Nebraska Wesleyan +	5	–	1	–	1	7	–	1	–	1
Hastings	5	–	2	–	1	6	–	2	–	1
Doane	4	–	2	–	1	6	–	2	–	1
Kearney State	4	–	3	–	1	6	–	3	–	1
Peru State	3	–	3	–	2	3	–	4	–	2
Midland	1	–	4	–	2	2	–	5	–	2
Wayne State (NE)	0	–	4	–	3	0	–	4	–	3
York (NE)	0	–	7	–	0	2	–	7	–	0
+ – Conference co-champions

1947 New Mexico Conference football standings
	Conf.					Overall
Team	W		L		T	W		L		T
Sul Ross $	5	–	0	–	0	7	–	3	–	0
Adams State	5	–	1	–	0	6	–	3	–	0
New Mexico Military	4	–	2	–	0	6	–	4	–	0
Eastern New Mexico	3	–	3	–	0	5	–	4	–	0
Panhandle A&M	2	–	4	–	0	3	–	6	–	0
New Mexico Teachers	1	–	5	–	0	2	–	6	–	0
New Mexico Highlands	0	–	5	–	0	2	–	5	–	0
$ – Conference champion

1947 North Central Conference football standings
	Conf.					Overall
Team	W		L		T	W		L		T
South Dakota +	4	–	0	–	0	7	–	2	–	0
Iowa State Teachers +	4	–	0	–	0	5	–	3	–	1
South Dakota State	3	–	1	–	0	4	–	5	–	0
North Dakota	2	–	2	–	0	4	–	4	–	0
Augustana (SD)	2	–	3	–	0	3	–	5	–	0
Morningside	0	–	4	–	0	4	–	4	–	0
North Dakota State	0	–	5	–	0	1	–	7	–	0
+ – Conference co-champions

1947 North Dakota Intercollegiate Conference football standings
	Conf.					Overall
Team	W		L		T	W		L		T
Valley City State $	6	–	1	–	0	6	–	1	–	0
Minot State	4	–	1	–	0	6	–	1	–	0
Ellendale	4	–	1	–	0	5	–	1	–	0
Wahpeton Science	3	–	2	–	0	3	–	4	–	0
Bottineau	1	–	2	–	1	4	–	2	–	1
Jamestown	1	–	3	–	1	1	–	5	–	1
Dickinson State	0	–	4	–	1	0	–	6	–	2
Mayville State	0	–	5	–	1	0	–	6	–	1
$ – Conference champion

1947 North State Conference football standings
	Conf.					Overall
Team	W		L		T	W		L		T
Catawba $	6	–	0	–	0	11	–	1	–	0
Appalachian State	6	–	1	–	0	9	–	1	–	0
Lenoir Rhyne	4	–	3	–	1	5	–	4	–	1
High Point	3	–	3	–	1	5	–	4	–	2
Guilford	2	–	3	–	0	4	–	6	–	0
Western Carolina	2	–	3	–	0	3	–	5	–	1
Elon	2	–	5	–	0	4	–	6	–	0
East Carolina	1	–	3	–	0	3	–	6	–	0
Atlantic Christian	0	–	5	–	0	0	–	8	–	0
$ – Conference champion

1947 Northwest Conference football standings
	Conf.					Overall
Team	W		L		T	W		L		T
Willamette $	6	–	0	–	0	7	–	2	–	0
Pacific (OR)	5	–	2	–	0	6	–	3	–	0
College of Idaho	4	–	2	–	0	7	–	2	–	0
Puget Sound	3	–	2	–	0	4	–	5	–	0
Linfield	3	–	3	–	1	5	–	4	–	1
Whitman	1	–	5	–	1	1	–	6	–	1
British Columbia	1	–	6	–	0	1	–	7	–	0
Lewis & Clark	0	–	3	–	2	2	–	3	–	3
$ – Conference champion

1947 Ohio Athletic Conference football standings
	Conf.					Overall
Team	W		L		T	W		L		T
Denison $	6	–	0	–	0	9	–	0	–	0
Findlay	4	–	0	–	0	9	–	1	–	0
Heidelberg	6	–	1	–	0	7	–	1	–	0
John Carroll	5	–	1	–	0	6	–	3	–	0
Toledo	3	–	1	–	0	9	–	2	–	0
Kent State	3	–	1	–	0	4	–	4	–	0
Baldwin–Wallace	4	–	2	–	0	5	–	4	–	0
Ohio Wesleyan	4	–	2	–	0	6	–	2	–	1
Wittenberg	4	–	4	–	0	4	–	5	–	0
Muskingum	3	–	3	–	0	5	–	3	–	0
Kenyon	1	–	1	–	0	3	–	4	–	0
Wooster	4	–	5	–	0	4	–	5	–	0
Mount Union	3	–	4	–	0	5	–	4	–	0
Ohio Northern	2	–	4	–	0	2	–	5	–	1
Oberlin	1	–	2	–	0	3	–	4	–	1
Wilmington (OH)	1	–	2	–	0	2	–	6	–	0
Akron	2	–	5	–	0	2	–	6	–	0
Ashland	1	–	3	–	0	3	–	5	–	0
Marietta	1	–	3	–	0	2	–	5	–	0
Otterbein	1	–	4	–	0	2	–	6	–	1
Capital	1	–	6	–	0	2	–	6	–	1
Case	0	–	5	–	0	1	–	7	–	0
$ – Conference champion

1947 Oklahoma Collegiate Conference football standings
	Conf.					Overall
Team	W		L		T	W		L		T
SE Oklahoma State $	5	–	0	–	0	7	–	1	–	1
Central State (OK)	3	–	1	–	1	7	–	1	–	1
Northeastern State	3	–	2	–	0	5	–	5	–	0
SW Oklahoma State	2	–	2	–	1	4	–	3	–	1
East Central	0	–	4	–	1	4	–	5	–	1
NW Oklahoma State	0	–	4	–	1	0	–	7	–	1
$ – Conference champion

1947 Pennsylvania State Teachers College Conference football standings
	Conf.					Overall
Team	W		L		T	W		L		T
West Chester	3	–	0	–	0	10	–	1	–	0
Slippery Rock	3	–	0	–	0	4	–	2	–	1
Mansfield $	4	–	1	–	1	5	–	2	–	1
Bloomsburg	5	–	2	–	0	6	–	2	–	0
Shippensburg	5	–	2	–	1	5	–	2	–	1
Lock Haven	4	–	2	–	1	7	–	2	–	1
Indiana (PA)	2	–	2	–	2	3	–	3	–	2
California (PA)	1	–	2	–	0	6	–	1	–	0
Edinboro	1	–	2	–	0	1	–	6	–	0
Kutztown	1	–	4	–	0	2	–	6	–	0
Millersville	0	–	5	–	1	2	–	5	–	1
East Stroudsburg	0	–	3	–	0	3	–	3	–	0
Clarion	0	–	4	–	0	2	–	5	–	0
$ – Conference champion; West Chester and Slippery Rock were ineligible for the conference title as they did not play the required four conference games.

1947 Pioneer Conference (Illinois) football standings
	Conf.					Overall
Team	W		L		T	W		L		T
Quincy (IL) $	3	–	0	–	0	4	–	3	–	0
Shurtleff	2	–	1	–	0	6	–	3	–	0
Eureka	1	–	2	–	0	2	–	5	–	0
McKendree	0	–	3	–	0	0	–	7	–	0
$ – Conference champion

1947 Rocky Mountain Conference football standings
	Conf.					Overall
Team	W		L		T	W		L		T
Montana State $	1	–	0	–	0	4	–	5	–	0
Colorado College	2	–	1	–	0	4	–	5	–	0
Colorado State–Greeley	2	–	1	–	1	4	–	4	–	1
Colorado Mines	1	–	2	–	0	1	–	7	–	0
Western State (CO)	0	–	2	–	1	1	–	6	–	1
$ – Conference champion

1947 Smoky Mountain Conference football standings
	Conf.					Overall
Team	W		L		T	W		L		T
Carson–Newman $	3	–	0	–	0	8	–	1	–	2
Milligan	2	–	1	–	0	5	–	4	–	1
Emory and Henry	1	–	2	–	0	2	–	8	–	1
Tusculum	0	–	3	–	0	0	–	8	–	0
$ – Conference champion

1947 South Dakota Intercollegiate Conference football standings
	Conf.					Overall
Team	W		L		T	W		L		T
South Dakota Mines $	3	–	1	–	0	4	–	2	–	2
Northern State	2	–	1	–	0	6	–	3	–	0
Black Hills	1	–	1	–	1	3	–	4	–	2
General Beadle	1	–	2	–	0	2	–	5	–	0
Southern State (SD)	0	–	2	–	1	0	–	6	–	1
$ – Conference champion

1947 Southeastern Athletic Conference football standings
	Conf.					Overall
Team	W		L		T	W		L		T
Bethune–Cookman $	6	–	0	–	0	10	–	2	–	0
Allen	3	–	0	–	0	6	–	4	–	0
Florida Normal	4	–	1	–	0	7	–	3	–	0
Paine	3	–	3	–	0	3	–	4	–	0
Claflin	2	–	5	–	0	2	–	6	–	0
Albany State	1	–	3	–	1	3	–	4	–	1
Georgia State	1	–	5	–	1	1	–	5	–	1
Morris	1	–	4	–	0	?	–	?	–	?
$ – Conference champion

1947 Southern California Conference football standings
	Conf.					Overall
Team	W		L		T	W		L		T
Redlands $	4	–	0	–	0	6	–	3	–	0
Occidental	2	–	1	–	1	4	–	3	–	1
Pomona	1	–	2	–	1	3	–	3	–	1
Whittier	1	–	2	–	1	2	–	6	–	1
Caltech	0	–	3	–	1	1	–	5	–	1
$ – Conference champion

1947 Southern Intercollegiate Athletic Conference football standings
	Conf.					Overall
Team	W		L		T	W		L		T
No. 3 Florida A&M $	5	–	0	–	0	9	–	1	–	0
No. 10 South Carolina State	5	–	0	–	2	7	–	1	–	2
No. 15 Fort Valley State	4	–	0	–	1	7	–	1	–	1
No. 3 (small) LeMoyne	2	–	1	–	0	4	–	1	–	1
Tuskegee	3	–	2	–	1	6	–	4	–	1
No. 21 Clark (GA)	3	–	2	–	1	4	–	3	–	1
No. 18 Lane	2	–	2	–	0	6	–	5	–	0
Morehouse	3	–	4	–	0	3	–	5	–	0
Morris Brown	2	–	4	–	1	3	–	7	–	1
Knoxville	1	–	2	–	1	-	–	-	–	-
Alabama State	2	–	5	–	2	2	–	6	–	2
Fisk	1	–	3	–	1	-	–	-	–	-
No. 7 (small) Alabama A&M	1	–	4	–	1	3	–	5	–	1
Xavier (LA)	0	–	2	–	1	1	–	5	–	1
Benedict	0	–	3	–	2	2	–	4	–	3
$ – Conference champion; Rankings from the Pittsburgh Courier using the Dickinson Ratings System.

1947 Southwestern Athletic Conference football standings
	Conf.					Overall
Team	W		L		T	W		L		T
No. 8 Southern $	7	–	0	–	0	10	–	2	–	0
No. 17 Prairie View A&M	5	–	2	–	0	6	–	6	–	0
No. 16 Texas College	3	–	1	–	1	5	–	2	–	3
Bishop	3	–	2	–	2	3	–	4	–	3
No. 20 Wiley	3	–	3	–	1	4	–	3	–	2
Langston	2	–	4	–	1	2	–	7	–	1
Samuel Huston	1	–	6	–	0	3	–	9	–	0
Arkansas AM&N	0	–	6	–	1	2	–	7	–	1
$ – Conference champion; Rankings from the Pittsburgh Courier using the Dickinson Ratings System.

1947 Texas Conference football standings
	Conf.					Overall
Team	W		L		T	W		L		T
McMurry +	4	–	1	–	0	7	–	3	–	1
Hardin +	4	–	1	–	0	7	–	4	–	0
Abilene Christian	3	–	2	–	0	6	–	3	–	0
Howard Payne	2	–	3	–	0	4	–	6	–	0
Austin	2	–	3	–	0	2	–	6	–	1
Southwestern (TX)	0	–	5	–	0	3	–	6	–	0
+ – Conference co-champions

1947 Volunteer State Athletic Conference football standings
	Conf.					Overall
Team	W		L		T	W		L		T
Middle Tennessee $	5	–	0	–	0	9	–	1	–	0
Tennessee Tech	1	–	1	–	0	4	–	7	–	0
Union (TN)	1	–	1	–	0	5	–	5	–	0
Cumberland (TN)	0	–	2	–	1	5	–	5	–	1
Austin Peay	0	–	2	–	1	3	–	6	–	1
Milligan	0	–	1	–	0	5	–	4	–	1
$ – Conference champion

1947 Washington Intercollegiate Conference football standings
	Conf.					Overall
Team	W		L		T	W		L		T
Pacific Lutheran +	4	–	0	–	1	7	–	0	–	2
Eastern Washington +	4	–	0	–	1	6	–	1	–	1
Western Washington	3	–	2	–	0	5	–	3	–	0
Central Washington	2	–	3	–	0	3	–	4	–	0
Saint Martin's	1	–	4	–	0	3	–	6	–	0
Whitworth	0	–	5	–	0	3	–	6	–	0
+ – Conference co-champions

1947 West Virginia Intercollegiate Athletic Conference football standings
	Conf.					Overall
Team	W		L		T	W		L		T
Potomac State $	6	–	0	–	2	6	–	1	–	2
West Liberty State	3	–	0	–	1	8	–	0	–	2
Fairmont State	4	–	1	–	0	4	–	3	–	1
West Virginia Tech	4	–	2	–	0	0	–	5	–	3
Davis & Elkins	4	–	3	–	0	4	–	4	–	0
West Virginia Wesleyan	3	–	2	–	0	6	–	2	–	0
Morris Harvey	3	–	3	–	0	4	–	5	–	0
Salem	2	–	3	–	0	3	–	5	–	0
Glenville State	2	–	5	–	1	5	–	3	–	0
Concord	0	–	5	–	1	1	–	6	–	1
Shepherd	0	–	6	–	1	0	–	6	–	1
Marshall *	1	–	0	–	0	9	–	3	–	0
Bethany (WV) *	0	–	2	–	0	0	–	8	–	0
$ – Conference champion; * – Did not qualify for conference standings Ties did not count in conference standings.

1947 Wisconsin State Teachers College Conference football standings
	Conf.					Overall
Team	W		L		T	W		L		T
Northern Division
River Falls State x	4	–	0	–	0	7	–	1	–	0
Superior State	3	–	1	–	0	6	–	1	–	0
La Crosse State	2	–	2	–	0	3	–	4	–	0
Stout Institute	1	–	3	–	0	1	–	5	–	2
Eau Claire State	0	–	4	–	0	2	–	6	–	0
Southern Division
Milwaukee State x	4	–	0	–	0	6	–	2	–	0
Stevens Point State	2	–	2	–	0	2	–	5	–	0
Whitewater State	1	–	2	–	1	2	–	3	–	1
Platteville State	1	–	2	–	1	1	–	2	–	2
Oshkosh State	1	–	3	–	0	3	–	4	–	0
x – Division champion/co-champions

0

1947 Yankee Conference football standings
	Conf.					Overall
Team	W		L		T	W		L		T
New Hampshire $	4	–	0	–	0	8	–	1	–	0
Maine	2	–	1	–	0	6	–	1	–	0
Connecticut	1	–	2	–	0	2	–	4	–	0
Rhode Island State	1	–	3	–	0	3	–	4	–	0
Massachusetts	0	–	1	–	1	3	–	4	–	1
Vermont	0	–	1	–	1	3	–	4	–	1
$ – Conference champion

=== Non-major independents ===
1947 Eastern non-major college football independents records
	Conf.			Overall
Team	W	L	T	W		L		T
Muhlenberg		–		9	–	1	–	0
Buffalo		–		8	–	1	–	0
Hofstra		–		5	–	3	–	0
Tufts		–		5	–	3	–	0
Franklin & Marshall		–		4	–	3	–	1
Springfield		–		4	–	4	–	0
CCNY		–		2	–	5	–	1
Bucknell		–		2	–	7	–	0
Northeastern		–		1	–	5	–	0
Carnegie Tech		–		0	–	6	–	0
Drexel		–		0	–	8	–	0

1947 Midwestern non-major college football independents records
	Conf.			Overall
Team	W	L	T	W		L		T
Youngstown		–		8	–	2	–	0
Ball State		–		5	–	1	–	2
Ohio Wesleyan		–		6	–	2	–	1
Wayne		–		5	–	2	–	0
Dayton		–		6	–	3	–	0
Washington University		–		5	–	3	–	0
Bowling Green		–		5	–	5	–	0
Michigan Tech		–		3	–	3	–	1
Xavier		–		4	–	4	–	1
Central Michigan		–		2	–	5	–	1
Valparaiso		–		2	–	5	–	1
Michigan State Normal		–		1	–	6	–	0

1947 Southern non-major college football independents records
	Conf.			Overall
Team	W	L	T	W		L		T
Princess Anne		–		8	–	0	–	0
Grambling		–		10	–	2	–	0
Sewanee		–		6	–	1	–	1
Memphis State		–		6	–	2	–	1
Texas State		–		9	–	3	–	0
Mississippi Southern		–		7	–	3	–	0
Oklahoma City		–		7	–	3	–	0
East Tennessee State		–		5	–	4	–	0
Catholic University		–		3	–	3	–	0
Delaware		–		4	–	4	–	0
Tennessee Tech		–		4	–	7	–	0
CCUNC		–		1	–	3	–	0
Florida State		–		0	–	5	–	0

1947 Western non-major college football independents records
	Conf.			Overall
Team	W	L	T	W		L		T
Pepperdine		–		9	–	0	–	0
Hawaii		–		8	–	5	–	0
Cal Poly San Dimas		–		4	–	4	–	1
La Verne		–		3	–	4	–	0
Idaho State		–		3	–	5	–	1
Loyola (CA)		–		3	–	7	–	0

== Bowl games ==
=== Major bowls ===
Bowl game	Winning team		Losing team	
Rose Bowl	No. 2 Michigan	49	No. 8 USC	0
Sugar Bowl	No. 5 Texas	27	No. 6 Alabama	7
Orange Bowl	No. 10 Georgia Tech	20	No. 12 Kansas	14
Cotton Bowl Classic	No. 3 SMU	13	No. 4 Penn State	13

=== Other bowls ===
Bowl game	Winning team		Losing team	
Sun Bowl	Miami (OH)	13	Texas Tech	12
Gator Bowl	Georgia	20	Maryland	20
Tangerine Bowl	Catawba	7	Marshall	0
Dixie Bowl	Arkansas	21	No. 14 William & Mary	19
Raisin Bowl	Pacific (CA)	26	Wichita	14
Harbor Bowl	Hardin–Simmons	53	San Diego State	0
Salad Bowl	Nevada	13	North Texas State	6
Delta Bowl	No. 13 Ole Miss	13	TCU	9
Great Lakes Bowl	Kentucky	24	Villanova	14
Pineapple Bowl	Hawaii	33	Redlands	32

== Heisman Trophy voting ==
The Heisman Trophy is given to the year's most outstanding player

Player	School	Position	Total
Johnny Lujack	Notre Dame	QB	742
Bob Chappuis	Michigan	HB	555
Doak Walker	SMU	HB	196
Charlie Conerly	Ole Miss	HB/QB	186
Harry Gilmer	Alabama	HB	115
Bobby Layne	Texas	QB	75
Chuck Bednarik	Penn	C	65
Bill Swiacki	Columbia	E	61

== See also ==
- 1947 College Football All-America Team
