= Great Lakes Bowl =

1947 Great Lakes Bowl
Kentucky Wildcats	Villanova Wildcats
(7–3)	(6–2–1)
24	14
Head coach: Bear Bryant	Head coach: Jordan Olivar
	1	2	3	4	Total
Kentucky	3	0	7	14	24
Villanova	0	0	0	14	14
- Date: December 6, 1947
- Season: 1947
- Stadium: Cleveland Stadium
- Location: Cleveland, Ohio
- Referee: John Coles (EAIFO; split crew: EAIFO, SEC)
- Attendance: 14,908

The Great Lakes Bowl was an American college football bowl game that was played only once, on December 6, 1947 in Cleveland, Ohio between the Kentucky Wildcats and the Villanova Wildcats. The game was played at Cleveland Stadium with attendance of 14,908.

Kentucky of the Southeastern Conference was in its second season under coach Bear Bryant. They brought a 7–3 record into the game, their losses coming to Ole Miss (ranked #13 in the final AP Poll of the season), Alabama (ranked #6 in the final AP Poll of the season) and Tennessee.

The Villanova Wildcats, coached by Jordan Olivar, brought a 6–2–1 record into the game, having lost to Army and Boston College. It was the first bowl appearance for Kentucky and the second for Villanova, which in 1936 tied Auburn, 7–7, in the Bacardi Bowl in Havana, Cuba. Neither team was ranked entering the game, though Kentucky had spent three weeks in the AP top twenty in October, rising as high as #13.

== Game summary ==
In the first quarter Kentucky's George Blanda kicked a 27-yard field goal. At halftime Kentucky led 3–0. In the third quarter Kentucky's Jim Howe had a 29-yard touchdown run; Blanda's point after kick gave Kentucky a 10–0 lead.

Yet Villanova, behind the accurate throws of highly touted quarterback Andy Gordon, marched back. Two plays into the fourth period, Villanova's Ralph Pasquariello, carrying several Kentucky defenders on his back, rambled 11-yards into the endzone. John Siano's conversion pulled Villanova within a field goal, 10–7.

Later in the fourth quarter, Kentucky's Jack Griffin broke through the Villanova line to partially block a punt, giving Kentucky excellent field position at the 25-yard line. Several plays later, Kentucky's Bill Boller raced 25 yards for a touchdown, and after the Blanda extra-point, Kentucky had cushioned its lead to 17–7. With time now against them, Villanova went to the air, but Kentucky's Boller intercepted a Gordon pass and returned it 49 yards for another touchdown. Now trailing 24–7, Gordon returned to the air first hitting Zip Zehler with a 38-yard strike, Gordon then connected with John Sheehan for a 13-yard touchdown pass. With the Siano conversion the score was 24–14.

Villanova's Joe Rogers, Captain of the squad for the game, also made sizable gains during the game.

The Great Lakes Bowl was never played again as a major bowl game, but did take place in 1948 as a small college bowl game where John Carroll University defeated Canisius College 14–13.

Kentucky and Villanova met again in the regular season the following year. They tied 13–13 in Lexington, Kentucky, on November 6, 1948.

=== Scoring summary ===
- Kentucky — George Blanda 27-yard field goal
- Kentucky — Howe 29-yard run (George Blanda kick)
- Villanova — Pasquariello 11-yard run (John Siano kick)
- Kentucky — Boller 25-yard run (George Blanda kick)
- Kentucky — Boller 49-yard interception return (George Blanda kick)
- Villanova — Gordon 13-yard pass to Sheehan (John Siano kick)

== See also ==
- List of college bowl games
