= 1948 Sugar Bowl =

American college football game

- 14th Sugar Bowl
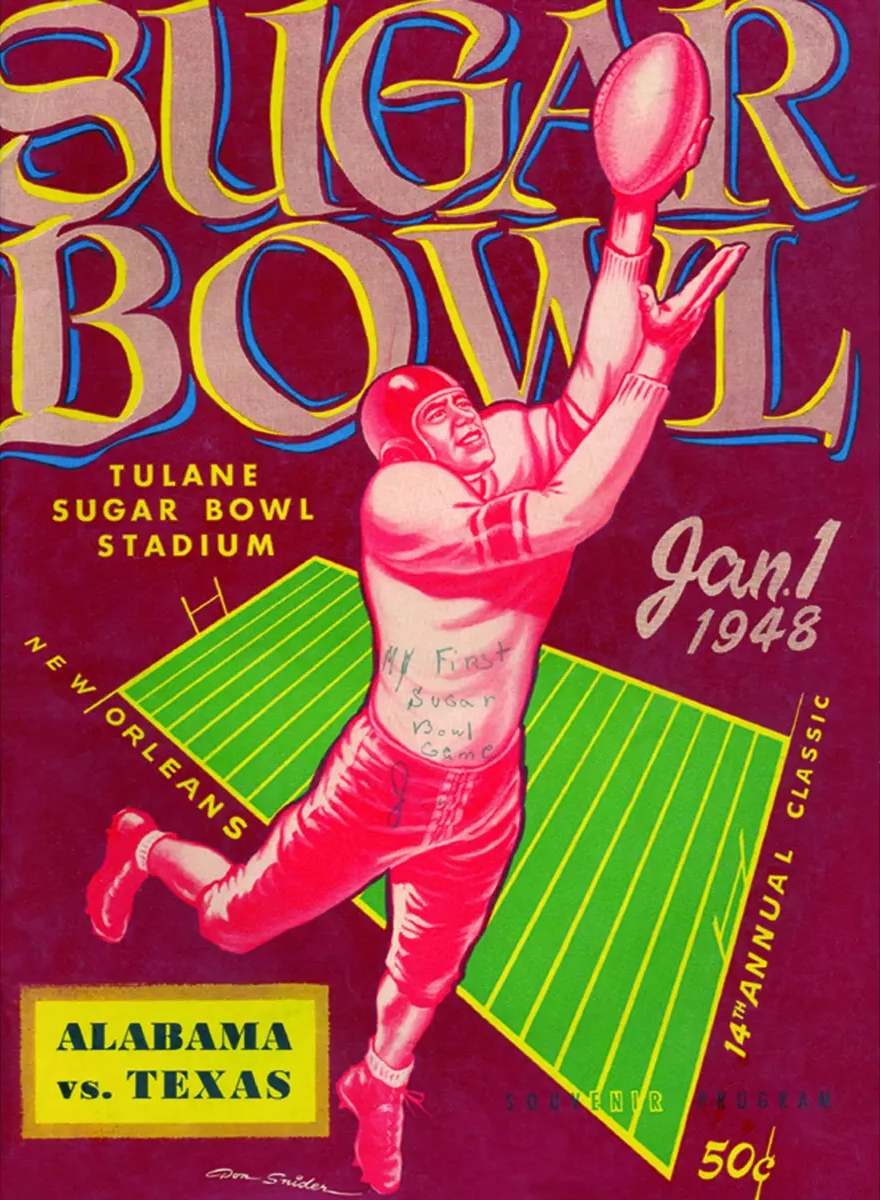
Texas Longhorns	Alabama Crimson Tide
(9–1)	(8–2)
SWC	SEC
27	7
Head coach: Blair Cherry	Head coach: Harold Drew
AP 5	AP 6
	1	2	3	4	Total
Texas	7	0	7	13	27
Alabama	0	7	0	0	7
- Date: January 1, 1948
- Season: 1947
- Stadium: Tulane Stadium
- Location: New Orleans, Louisiana
- MVP: Bobby Layne, Texas QB
- Referee: Alvin Bell (SEC; split crew: SEC, SWC)
- Attendance: 73,000

The 1948 Sugar Bowl featured the fifth ranked Texas Longhorns and the sixth ranked Alabama Crimson Tide.

In the first quarter, Texas scored on a 99-yard touchdown pass from Bobby Layne to Ralph "Peppy" Blount, as Texas opened a 7–0 lead. In the second quarter, Alabama tied the game on an 8-yard touchdown pass from Harry Gilmer to Ed White. In the third quarter, Texas's Vic Vasicek recovered a fumble in the end zone as Texas took a 14–7 lead. Lew Holder later returned an interception 18 yards for a touchdown making it 21-7. Layne scored on a 1-yard touchdown run making the final score 27-7.

Layne was named Sugar Bowl Most Outstanding Player and became the first winner of the Miller Award.
