= 1947 Arkansas Razorbacks football team =

American college football season

1947 Arkansas Razorbacks football

Dixie Bowl champion

Dixie Bowl, W 21–19 vs. William & Mary
- Conference: Southwest Conference
- Record: 6–4–1 (1–4–1 SWC)
- Head coach: John Barnhill (2nd season)
- Captain: James Minor
- Home stadium: Razorback Stadium

1947 Southwest Conference football standings
	Conf.					Overall
Team	W		L		T	W		L		T
No. 3 SMU $	5	–	0	–	1	9	–	0	–	2
No. 5 Texas	5	–	1	–	0	10	–	1	–	0
No. 18 Rice	4	–	2	–	0	6	–	3	–	1
TCU	2	–	3	–	1	4	–	5	–	2
Arkansas	1	–	4	–	1	6	–	4	–	1
Texas A&M	1	–	4	–	1	3	–	6	–	1
Baylor	1	–	5	–	0	5	–	5	–	0
$ – Conference champion; Rankings from AP Poll

The 1947 Arkansas Razorbacks football team represented the University of Arkansas in the Southwest Conference (SWC) during the 1947 college football season. In their second year under head coach John Barnhill, the Razorbacks compiled a 6–4–1 record (1–4–1 against SWC opponents), finished in a tie for fifth place in the SWC, and outscored their opponents by a combined total of 191 to 145.

Clyde Scott led the Razorbacks in rushing in 1947 with 659 rushing yards on 152 carries (4.3 yard average). Quarterback Kenny Holland was the leading passer, completing 25 of 46 passes for 360 yards. Ross Pritchard was the team's leading receiver with 15 catches for 266 yards.

Arkansas was ranked at No. 27 (out of 500 college football teams) in the final Litkenhous Ratings for 1947.

== Schedule ==
Date	Opponent	Site	Result	Attendance	Source
September 20	at Northwestern State*	Razorback Stadium; Fayetteville, AR	W 64–0		
September 27	North Texas State Teachers*	Quigley Stadium; Little Rock, AR	W 12–0	15,000	
October 4	TCU	Razorback Stadium; Fayetteville, AR	W 6–0	16,000	
October 11	at Baylor	Municipal Stadium; Waco, TX	L 9–17	12,000–15,000	
October 18	vs. No. 3 Texas	Crump Stadium; Memphis, TN (rivalry)	L 6–21	28,000	
October 25	vs. Ole Miss*	Crump Stadium; Memphis, TN (rivalry)	W 19–14	28,000	
November 1	Texas A&M^{†}	Razorback Stadium; Fayetteville, AR (rivalry)	T 21–21	19,000	
November 8	at Rice	Rice Field; Houston, TX	L 0–26		
November 15	at No. 4 SMU	Ownby Stadium; Dallas, TX	L 6–14	23,000	
November 27	at Tulsa*	Skelly Stadium; Tulsa, OK	W 27–13	22,000–23,000	
January 1	vs. No. 14 William & Mary*	Legion Field; Birmingham, AL (Dixie Bowl)	W 21–19	25,000	
*Non-conference game; ^{†}Homecoming; Rankings from AP Poll released prior to the game

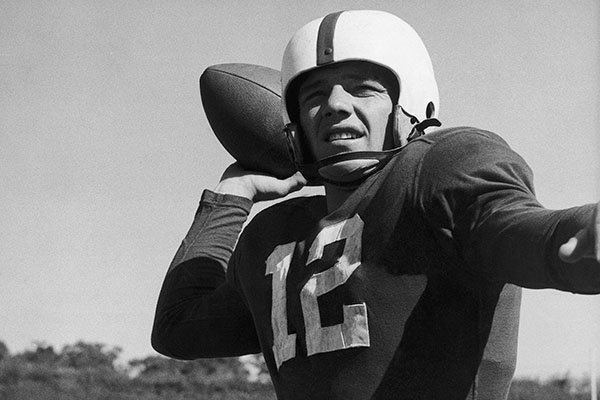
Clyde Scott

== Dixie Bowl ==
	1	2	3	4	Total
Razorbacks	0	14	0	7	21
Indians	7	6	6	0	19

Arkansas was set to play in the inaugural Dixie Bowl, which was the first of only two ever played, against a 9–1 William & Mary team. The Indians got on top early, recovering a Razorback fumbled quick-kick on the Arkansas six yard line, after which Jack Cloud scored from the one to give fourteenth-ranked William & Mary a 7–0 lead. The Indians drove another 78 yards, with Cloud again hitting pay dirt, but QB Stan Magdziak could not convert the extra point, leaving the score 13–0. The Razorbacks answered with a 59-yard touchdown pass from Kenny Holland to Ross Pritchard. Moments later, defensive halfback Melvin McGaha would intercept an errant Indian pass and returned it 70 yards for a touchdown. Aubrey Fowler's extra point was true, and the Razorbacks had a one-point lead. After halftime, William & Mary took back the lead with a six-yard strike from Magdziak to Henry Bland, but the extra point was again no good. A 97-yard Razorback drive was capped by Leon Campbell sprinting in from seven yards out with five minutes to play to give Arkansas a 21–19 lead, one that would not be relinquished. The crowd of 21,000 watched Arkansas push their record in bowl games to 1–0–2, which could have been 0–0–3 had the Indians converted two extra points.

Arkansas rushed for 103 yards against a William & Mary team that was allowing 61.5 yards per contest, second behind only Penn State's 17 yards per game.

== Scoring summary ==
Scoring summary

Quarter	Time	Drive			Team	Scoring information	Score	
Quarter	Time	Plays	Yards	TOP	Team	Scoring information	ARK	W&M
1			6		W&M	Jack Cloud 1-yard touchdown run, Stan Magdziak kick good	0	7
2			78		W&M	Jack Cloud 2-yard touchdown run, Stan Magdziak kick no good	0	13
2					ARK	Ross Pritchard 59-yard touchdown reception from Kenny Holland, Aubrey Fowler kick good	7	13
2			70		ARK	Interception returned 70 yards for touchdown by Melvin McGaha, Aubrey Fowler kick good	14	13
3					W&M	Henry Bland 6-yard touchdown reception from Stan Magdziak, Stan Magdziak kick no good	14	19
4			97		ARK	Leon Campbell 7-yard touchdown run, Aubrey Fowler kick good	21	19
"TOP" = time of possession. For other American football terms, see Glossary of American football.							21	19
