= 1947 Kentucky Wildcats football team =

American college football season

1947 Kentucky Wildcats football

Great Lakes Bowl, W 24–14 vs. Villanova
- Conference: Southeastern Conference
- Record: 8–3 (2–3 SEC)
- Head coach: Bear Bryant (2nd season)
- Captain: Bill Moseley
- Home stadium: McLean Stadium

1947 Southeastern Conference football standings
	Conf.					Overall
Team	W		L		T	W		L		T
No. 13 Ole Miss $	6	–	1	–	0	9	–	2	–	0
No. 10 Georgia Tech	4	–	1	–	0	10	–	1	–	0
No. 6 Alabama	5	–	2	–	0	8	–	3	–	0
Mississippi State	2	–	2	–	0	7	–	3	–	0
Georgia	3	–	3	–	0	7	–	4	–	1
Vanderbilt	3	–	3	–	0	6	–	4	–	0
Tulane	2	–	3	–	2	2	–	5	–	2
LSU	2	–	3	–	1	5	–	3	–	1
Kentucky	2	–	3	–	0	8	–	3	–	0
Tennessee	2	–	3	–	0	5	–	5	–	0
Auburn	1	–	5	–	0	2	–	7	–	0
Florida	0	–	3	–	1	4	–	5	–	1
$ – Conference champion; Rankings from AP Poll

The 1947 Kentucky Wildcats football team was an American footballteam that represented the University of Kentucky as a member of the Southeastern Conference during the 1947 college football season. In its second season under head coach Bear Bryant, the team compiled an 8–3 record (2–3 against SEC opponents), defeated Villanova in the Great Lakes Bowl, and outscored all opponents by a total of 175 to 73. The team played its home games at McLean Stadium in Lexington, Kentucky.

The 1947 Kentucky team was ranked in the AP Poll during three weeks of the season: No. 20 on October 13; No. 14 on October 20; and No. 13 on October 27. Kentucky dropped out of the poll after losing its second game to Alabama. The team was ranked at No. 29 in the final Litkenhous Ratings.

Three Kentucky players were honored on the 1947 All-SEC football teams selected by both the Associated Press (AP) and United Press (UP): center Jay Rhodemyre (AP-1; UP-1); tackle Wash Serini (AP-2); and guard Lee Yarutis (AP-3).

Junior George Blanda was Kentucky's starting quarterback in 1947 and 1948. Blanda later played 26 years in the National Football League and set the league's all-time scoring record.

== Schedule ==
Date	Opponent	Rank	Site	Result	Attendance	Source
September 20	at Ole Miss		Hemingway Stadium; Oxford, MS	L 7–14	18,000	
September 27	Cincinnati		McLean Stadium; Lexington, KY	W 20–0	23,800	
October 4	at Xavier		Xavier Stadium; Cincinnati, OH	W 20–7	15,000	
October 11	No. 9 Georgia		McLean Stadium; Lexington, KY	W 26–0	24,000	
October 18	at No. 10 Vanderbilt	No. 20	Dudley Field; Nashville, TN (rivalry)	W 14–0	22,500	
October 25	at Michigan State	No. 14	Macklin Field; East Lansing, MI	W 7–6	26,997	
November 1	No. 18 Alabama	No. 13	McLean Stadium; Lexington, KY	L 0–13	24,500	
November 8	at West Virginia		Mountaineer Field; Morgantown, WV	W 15–6	26,500	
November 15	Evansville		McLean Stadium; Lexington, KY	W 36–0	15,000	
November 22	Tennessee^{†}		McLean Stadium; Lexington, KY (rivalry)	L 6–13	25,000	
December 6	Villanova		Cleveland Stadium; Cleveland, OH (Great Lakes Bowl)	W 24–14	15,000	
^{†}Homecoming; Rankings from AP Poll released prior to the game

== Rankings ==
Ranking movements Legend: ██ Increase in ranking ██ Decrease in ranking — = Not ranked
	Week									
Poll	1	2	3	4	5	6	7	8	9	Final
AP	—	20	14	13	—	—	—	—	—	—
