= 1948 Cotton Bowl Classic =

- 12th Cotton Bowl Classic
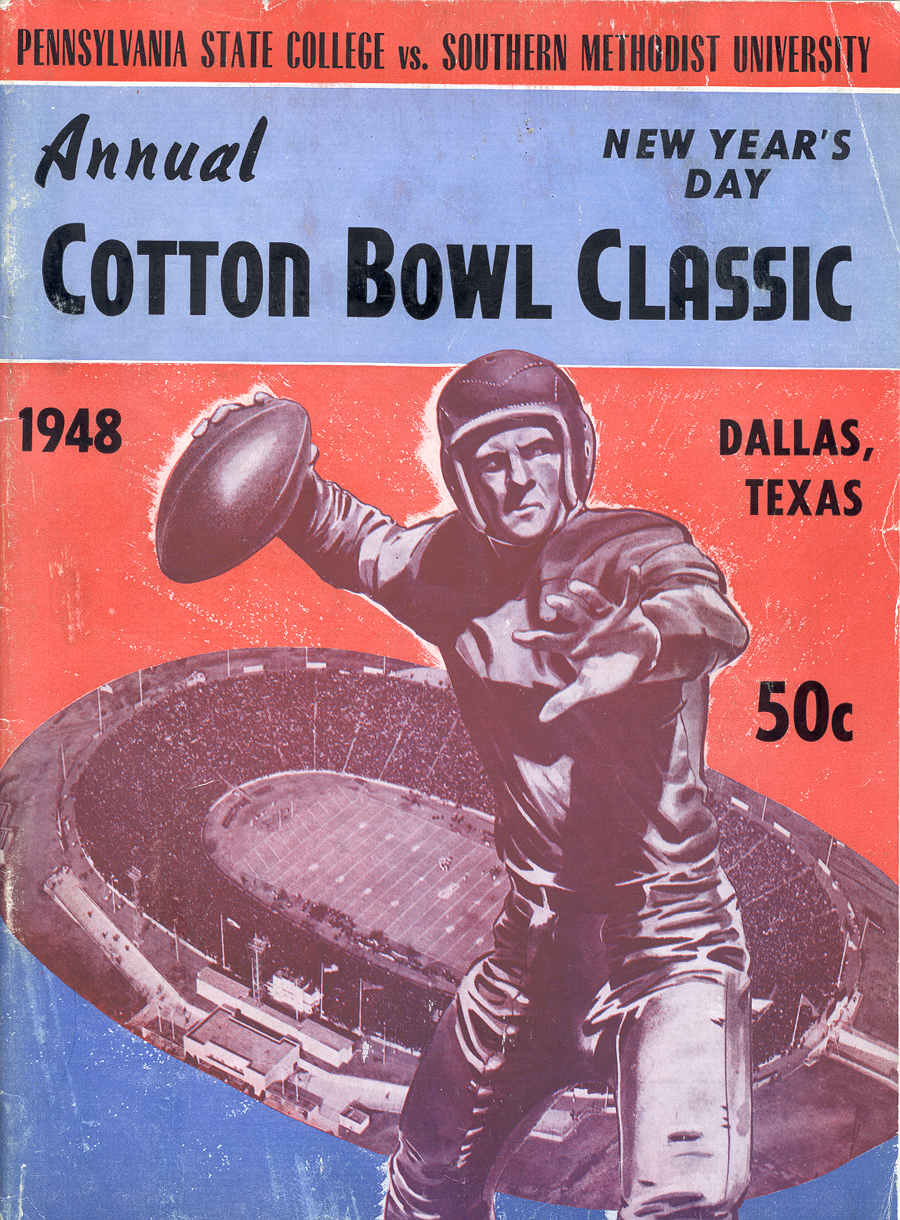
Penn State Nittany Lions	SMU Mustangs
(9–0)	(9–0–1)
Independent	SWC
13	13
Head coach: Bob Higgins	Head coach: Matty Bell
AP 4	AP 3
	1	2	3	4	Total
Penn State	0	7	6	0	13
SMU	7	6	0	0	13
- Date: January 1, 1948
- Season: 1947
- Stadium: Cotton Bowl
- Location: Dallas, Texas
- MVP: G Steve Suhey (Penn State); RB Doak Walker (SMU)
- Referee: Abb Curtis (SWC; split crew: SWC, EAIFO)
- Attendance: 43,000

The Cotton Bowl in Dallas, Texas, hosted the Cotton Bowl Classic.

The 1948 Cotton Bowl Classic was a post-season game between the SMU Mustangs and the Penn State Nittany Lions. It was the first interracial bowl game in the southern United States. The game was a struggle of yardage with the final score being decided on a missed extra point.

== Background ==
SMU was coached by Matty Bell and led by Doak Walker, who was named All-American. SMU went unbeaten and had won the Southwest Conference championship.

Penn State was coached by Bob Higgins, who would retire after next season. They also went unbeaten as an Independent. Coincidentally, Higgins was the coach who had handed SMU their first bowl loss back in 1925.

== First interracial bowl game ==
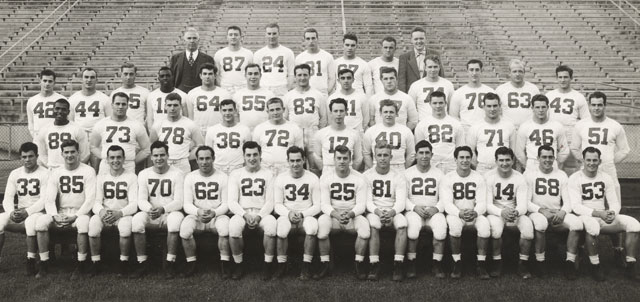
1947 Penn State team was the first to be interracial at the Cotton Bowl.

This was the first bowl game to feature African American players. Wallace Triplett and Dennis Hoggard played for Penn State after team captain Steve Suhey denied a request for the team to vote on whether to allow Triplett and Hoggard to play, saying the whole team would play or they would not attend at all. The team stayed at the Dallas Air Naval Training base due to Triplett and Hoggard not being allowed in the cities' hotels. Triplett said that the crowd was not pleased with this being an interracial game, jeering and yelling profanity during the game.

== Game summary ==
Doak Walker scored the first seven points of the game on a 53-yard touchdown pass to Paul Page. Later in the second quarter, Walker scored again, this time on a two-yard touchdown run as the extra point was missed. Penn State roared back with Larry Cooney's 38-yard touchdown catch from Elwood Petchel as the game was 13–7 at halftime.

Wallace Triplett caught a touchdown pass from Petchel in the third quarter, but the extra point missed as the game was tied, 13–13. The game had no further points as Walker was limited to 75 yards combined and Penn State lost two fumbles.

== Statistics ==
Attendance was recorded as 47,000.

Statistics	SMU	Penn State
First downs	12	12
Yards rushing	92	165
Yards passing	114	93
Total yards	206	258
Punts-Average	7-33.1	4-33.4
Fumbles-Lost	1-1	2-2
Interceptions	1	1
Penalties-Yards	1-5	3-15
