= 1947 Georgia Bulldogs football team =

American college football season

1947 Georgia Bulldogs football

Gator Bowl, T 20–20 vs. Maryland
- Conference: Southeastern Conference
- Record: 7–4–1 (3–3 SEC)
- Head coach: Wally Butts (9th season)
- Home stadium: Sanford Stadium

1947 Southeastern Conference football standings
	Conf.					Overall
Team	W		L		T	W		L		T
No. 13 Ole Miss $	6	–	1	–	0	9	–	2	–	0
No. 10 Georgia Tech	4	–	1	–	0	10	–	1	–	0
No. 6 Alabama	5	–	2	–	0	8	–	3	–	0
Mississippi State	2	–	2	–	0	7	–	3	–	0
Georgia	3	–	3	–	0	7	–	4	–	1
Vanderbilt	3	–	3	–	0	6	–	4	–	0
Tulane	2	–	3	–	2	2	–	5	–	2
LSU	2	–	3	–	1	5	–	3	–	1
Kentucky	2	–	3	–	0	8	–	3	–	0
Tennessee	2	–	3	–	0	5	–	5	–	0
Auburn	1	–	5	–	0	2	–	7	–	0
Florida	0	–	3	–	1	4	–	5	–	1
$ – Conference champion; Rankings from AP Poll

The 1947 Georgia Bulldogs football team was an American football team that represented the University of Georgia in the Southeastern Conference (SEC) during the 1947 college football season. In its ninth season under head coach Wally Butts, the team compiled a 7–4–1 record (3–3 against SEC opponents), tied for fifth place in the SEC, and outscored opponents by a total of 212 to 135. The team was invited to play in the 1948 Gator Bowl on New Year's Day, playing Maryland to a 20–20 tie.

Quarterback John Rauch led the team on offense. He was inducted into the College Football Hall of Fame in 2003.

Three Georgia players received honors from the Associated Press (AP) on the 1947 All-SEC football team: end Dan Edwards (AP-1); quarterback John Rauch (AP-2); and guard Herbert St. John (AP-2).

Georgia was ranked at No. 40 (out of 500 college football teams) in the final Litkenhous Ratings for 1947.

== Schedule ==
Date	Opponent	Rank	Site	Result	Attendance	Source
September 19	Furman*		Sanford Stadium; Athens, GA	W 13–7	17,000	
September 27	at North Carolina*		Kenan Memorial Stadium; Chapel Hill, NC	L 7–14	44,000	
October 4	LSU		Sanford Stadium; Athens, GA	W 35–19	45,000	
October 11	at Kentucky	No. 9	McLean Stadium; Lexington, KY	L 0–26	24,000	
October 18	at Oklahoma A&M*		Lewis Field; Stillwater, OK	W 20–7	21,000	
October 25	No. 18 Alabama^{†}		Sanford Field; Athens, GA (rivalry)	L 7–17	46,000	
October 31	Clemson*		Sanford Field; Athens, GA (rivalry)	W 21–6	18,000	
November 8	vs. Florida		Fairfield Stadium; Jacksonville, FL (rivalry)	W 34–6	23,000	
November 15	vs. Auburn		Memorial Stadium; Columbus, GA (Deep South's Oldest Rivalry)	W 28–6	22,000	
November 22	at Chattanooga*		Chamberlain Field; Chattanooga, TN	W 27–0	5,000	
November 29	at No. 9 Georgia Tech		Grant Field; Atlanta, GA (Clean, Old-Fashioned Hate)	L 0–7	38,000	
January 1, 1948	vs. Maryland*		Fairfield Stadium; Jacksonville, FL (Gator Bowl)	T 20–20	21,000	
*Non-conference game; ^{†}Homecoming; Rankings from AP Poll released prior to the game

== Rankings ==
Ranking movements Legend: ██ Increase in ranking ██ Decrease in ranking — = Not ranked
	Week									
Poll	1	2	3	4	5	6	7	8	9	Final
AP	9	—	—	—	—	—	—	—	—	—
