= 1947 Tulane Green Wave football team =

American college football season

1947 Tulane Green Wave football
- Conference: Southeastern Conference
- Record: 2–5–2 (2–3–2 SEC)
- Head coach: Henry Frnka (2nd season)
- Captain: Leonard Finley
- Home stadium: Tulane Stadium

1947 Southeastern Conference football standings
	Conf.					Overall
Team	W		L		T	W		L		T
No. 13 Ole Miss $	6	–	1	–	0	9	–	2	–	0
No. 10 Georgia Tech	4	–	1	–	0	10	–	1	–	0
No. 6 Alabama	5	–	2	–	0	8	–	3	–	0
Mississippi State	2	–	2	–	0	7	–	3	–	0
Georgia	3	–	3	–	0	7	–	4	–	1
Vanderbilt	3	–	3	–	0	6	–	4	–	0
Tulane	2	–	3	–	2	2	–	5	–	2
LSU	2	–	3	–	1	5	–	3	–	1
Kentucky	2	–	3	–	0	8	–	3	–	0
Tennessee	2	–	3	–	0	5	–	5	–	0
Auburn	1	–	5	–	0	2	–	7	–	0
Florida	0	–	3	–	1	4	–	5	–	1
$ – Conference champion; Rankings from AP Poll

The 1947 Tulane Green Wave football team was an American football team that represented Tulane University as a member of the Southeastern Conference (SEC) during the 1947 college football season. In its second year under head coach Henry Frnka, Tulane compiled a 2–5–2 record (2–3–2 in conference games), finished seventh in the SEC, and was outscored by a total of 192 to 94. Tulane was ranked No. 59 in the final Litkenhous Ratings released in December 1947.

Fullback Eddie Price received third-team honors on the 1947 All-SEC football team. He was later inducted into the College Football Hall of Fame.

The Green Wave played its home games at Tulane Stadium in New Orleans.

== Schedule ==
Date	Opponent	Site	Result	Attendance	Source
September 27	Alabama	Tulane Stadium; New Orleans, LA	W 21–20	60,000	
October 4	Georgia Tech	Tulane Stadium; New Orleans, LA	L 0–20	48,000	
October 11	at No. 16 Rice*	Rice Field; Houston, TX	L 0–33	28,000	
October 18	Ole Miss	Tulane Stadium; New Orleans, LA (rivalry)	L 14–27	> 40,000	
October 25	Auburn	Tulane Stadium; New Orleans, LA (rivalry)	W 40–0	30,000	
November 1	Mississippi State	Tulane Stadium; New Orleans, LA	L 0–20	35,000	
November 15	Florida	Tulane Stadium; New Orleans, LA	T 7–7	25,000	
November 22	at No. 2 Notre Dame*	Notre Dame Stadium; Notre Dame, IN	L 6–59	57,000	
December 6	LSU	Tulane Stadium; New Orleans, LA (Battle for the Rag)	T 6–6	67,000	
*Non-conference game; Rankings from AP Poll released prior to the game
