= 1947 Texas A&M Aggies football team =

American college football season

1947 Texas A&M Aggies football
- Conference: Southwest Conference
- Record: 3–6–1 (1–4–1 SWC)
- Head coach: Homer Norton (14th season)
- Home stadium: Kyle Field

1947 Southwest Conference football standings
	Conf.					Overall
Team	W		L		T	W		L		T
No. 3 SMU $	5	–	0	–	1	9	–	0	–	2
No. 5 Texas	5	–	1	–	0	10	–	1	–	0
No. 18 Rice	4	–	2	–	0	6	–	3	–	1
TCU	2	–	3	–	1	4	–	5	–	2
Arkansas	1	–	4	–	1	6	–	4	–	1
Texas A&M	1	–	4	–	1	3	–	6	–	1
Baylor	1	–	5	–	0	5	–	5	–	0
$ – Conference champion; Rankings from AP Poll

The 1947 Texas A&M Aggies football team represented the Agricultural and Mechanical College of Texas—now known as Texas A&M University—as a member of the Southwest Conference during the 1947 college football season. In its 14th season under head coach Homer H. Norton, the team compiled a 3–6–1 record (1–4–1 against conference opponents), tied for fifth place in the conference, and was outscored by a total of 185 to 169.

Texas A&M was ranked at No. 41 (out of 500 college football teams) in the final Litkenhous Ratings for 1947.

The team played its home games at Kyle Field in College Station, Texas.

== Schedule ==
Date	Opponent	Site	Result	Attendance	Source
September 20	Southwestern (TX)*	Kyle Field; College Station, TX	W 48–0	18,000	
September 27	vs. Texas Tech*	Alamo Stadium; San Antonio, TX (rivalry)	W 29-7	20,000	
October 4	at Oklahoma*	Oklahoma Memorial Stadium; Norman, OK	L 14–26	32,500	
October 11	at LSU*	Tiger Stadium; Baton Rouge, LA (rivalry)	L 13–19	35,000	
October 8	at TCU	Amon G. Carter Stadium; Fort Worth, TX (rivalry)	L 0–26	30,000	
October 25	Baylor	Kyle Field; College Station, TX (rivalry)	W 24–0		
November 1	at Arkansas	Razorback Stadium; Fayetteville, AR (rivalry)	T 21–21	19,000	
November 8	No. 3 SMU	Kyle Field; College Station, TX	L 0–13	38,000	
November 15	at Rice	Rice Field; Houston, TX	L 7–41	31,000	
November 27	No. 7 Texas	Kyle Field; College Station, TX (rivalry)	L 13–32	41,000	
*Non-conference game; Rankings from AP Poll released prior to the game
