= 1947 SMU Mustangs football team =

American college football season

1947 SMU Mustangs football

SWC champion

Cotton Bowl Classic, T 13–13 vs. Penn State
- Conference: Southwest Conference

Ranking
- AP: No. 3
- Record: 9–0–2 (5–0–1 SWC)
- Head coach: Matty Bell (10th season)
- Captain: Sid Halliday
- Home stadium: Ownby Stadium, Cotton Bowl

1947 Southwest Conference football standings
	Conf.					Overall
Team	W		L		T	W		L		T
No. 3 SMU $	5	–	0	–	1	9	–	0	–	2
No. 5 Texas	5	–	1	–	0	10	–	1	–	0
No. 18 Rice	4	–	2	–	0	6	–	3	–	1
TCU	2	–	3	–	1	4	–	5	–	2
Arkansas	1	–	4	–	1	6	–	4	–	1
Texas A&M	1	–	4	–	1	3	–	6	–	1
Baylor	1	–	5	–	0	5	–	5	–	0
$ – Conference champion; Rankings from AP Poll

The 1947 SMU Mustangs football team was an American football team that represented Southern Methodist University (SMU) as a member of the Southwest Conference (SWC) during the 1947 college football season. In its tenth season under head coach Matty Bell, the team compiled a 9–0–2 record (5–0–1 against SWC opponents), won the SWC championship, outscored opponents by a total of 182 to 90, and was ranked No. 3 in the final AP Poll. The team played its home games at Ownby Stadium on the SMU campus and at the Cotton Bowl in Dallas.

The Mustangs won their first nine games before tying with rival TCU and Penn State, the latter in the 1948 Cotton Bowl Classic on New Year's Day.

SMU's sophomore halfback, Doak Walker, led the country with 387 yards on 10 kickoff returns, an average of 38.7 yards per return. He won the Maxwell Award for 1947, was a consensus selection to the 1947 College Football All-America Team, and finished third in the 1947 voting for the Heisman Trophy. He finished second in the SWC (behind Bobby Layne) with 1,026 yards of total offense, including 684 rushing yards.

Four SMU players received first-team honors on the Associated Press 1947 All-Southwest Conference football team: Walker; end Sid Halliday; tackle Jim Winkler; and guard Earl Cook.

== Schedule ==
Date	Opponent	Rank	Site	Result	Attendance	Source
September 27	at Santa Clara*		Kezar Stadium; San Francisco, CA	W 22–6	5,000	
October 4	Missouri*		Cotton Bowl; Dallas, TX	W 35–19	26,000	
October 11	at Oklahoma A&M*		Lewis Field; Stillwater, OK	W 21–14	18,000	
October 18	No. 15 Rice		Ownby Stadium; University Park, TX (rivalry)	W 14–0	23,000	
October 25	at No. 16 UCLA*	No. 12	Los Angeles Memorial Coliseum; Los Angeles, CA	W 7–0	64,197	
November 1	No. 3 Texas	No. 8	Cotton Bowl; Dallas, TX	W 14–13	46,500	
November 8	at Texas A&M	No. 3	Kyle Field; College Station, TX	W 13–0	38,000	
November 15	Arkansas	No. 4	Ownby Stadium; University Park, TX	W 14–6	23,000	
November 22	at Baylor	No. 3	Municipal Stadium; Waco, TX	W 10–0	12,000	
November 29	at TCU	No. 3	Amon G. Carter Stadium; Fort Worth, TX (rivalry)	T 19–19	31,000	
January 1	vs. No. 4 Penn State	No. 3	Cotton Bowl; Dallas, TX (Cotton Bowl Classic)	T 13–13	47,000	
*Non-conference game; Rankings from AP Poll released prior to the game

== Rankings ==
Ranking movements Legend: ██ Increase in ranking ██ Decrease in ranking — = Not ranked ( ) = First-place votes
	Week									
Poll	1	2	3	4	5	6	7	8	9	Final
AP	—	—	12	8	3 (7)	4 (2)	3 (9)	3 (6)	4	3

== Players selected in the 1948 NFL draft ==
The following SMU players were selected in the 1947 NFL draft:

Player	Position	Round	Pick	NFL club
Earl Cook	Guard	3	17	Boston Yanks
Gil Johnson	Quarterback	11	93	Philadelphia Eagles
Bob Ramsey	Back	26	244	Pittsburgh Steelers
