= 1947 Georgia Tech Yellow Jackets football team =

American college football season

1947 Georgia Tech Yellow Jackets football

Orange Bowl champion

Orange Bowl, W 20–14 vs. Kansas
- Conference: Southeastern Conference

Ranking
- AP: No. 10
- Record: 10–1 (4–1 SEC)
- Head coach: Bobby Dodd (3rd season)
- Captains: Bill Healy; Rollo Phillips
- Home stadium: Grant Field

1947 Southeastern Conference football standings
	Conf.					Overall
Team	W		L		T	W		L		T
No. 13 Ole Miss $	6	–	1	–	0	9	–	2	–	0
No. 10 Georgia Tech	4	–	1	–	0	10	–	1	–	0
No. 6 Alabama	5	–	2	–	0	8	–	3	–	0
Mississippi State	2	–	2	–	0	7	–	3	–	0
Georgia	3	–	3	–	0	7	–	4	–	1
Vanderbilt	3	–	3	–	0	6	–	4	–	0
Tulane	2	–	3	–	2	2	–	5	–	2
LSU	2	–	3	–	1	5	–	3	–	1
Kentucky	2	–	3	–	0	8	–	3	–	0
Tennessee	2	–	3	–	0	5	–	5	–	0
Auburn	1	–	5	–	0	2	–	7	–	0
Florida	0	–	3	–	1	4	–	5	–	1
$ – Conference champion; Rankings from AP Poll

The 1947 Georgia Tech Yellow Jackets football team was an American football team represented the Georgia Institute of Technology in the Southeastern Conference (SEC) during the 1947 college football season. In its third season under head coach Bobby Dodd, Georgia Tech compiled a 10–1 record (4–1 against SEC opponents), finished second in the SEC, was ranked No. 10 in the final AP Poll, and outscored all opponents by a total of 240 to 49. The team played three games against ranked opponents, losing to No. 14 Alabama and defeating No. 9 Duke and No. 12 Kansas, the latter in the 1948 Orange Bowl on New Year's Day.

Georgia Tech shut out seven of eleven opponents and allowed an average of only 4.5 points per game, the third lowest among major college teams during the 1947 season.

Tackle Bob Davis was a consensus first-team pick for the 1947 College Football All-America Team. Five Georgia Tech players were honored by the Associated Press (AP) or the United Press (UP) on the 1947 All-SEC football team: Davis (AP-1, UP); guard Bill Healy (AP-1, UP); halfback Allen Bowen (AP-3); end George Broadnax (AP-3); and center Louis Hook (AP-3).

The team played its home games at Grant Field in Atlanta.

== Schedule ==
Date	Opponent	Rank	Site	Result	Attendance	Source
September 27	Tennessee		Grant Field; Atlanta, GA (rivalry)	W 27–0	40,000	
October 4	at Tulane		Tulane Stadium; New Orleans, LA	W 20–0	48,000	
October 11	VMI*	No. 4	Grant Field; Atlanta, GA	W 20–0	25,000	
October 18	Auburn	No. 5	Grant Field; Atlanta, GA (rivalry)	W 27–7	37,000	
October 25	The Citadel*	No. 7	Grant Field; Atlanta, GA	W 38–0	20,000	
November 1	No. 9 Duke*	No. 6	Grant Field; Atlanta, GA	W 7–0	38,000	
November 8	at Navy*	No. 6	Baltimore Stadium; Baltimore, MD	W 16–14	35,000	
November 15	at No. 14 Alabama	No. 6	Legion Field; Birmingham, AL (rivalry)	L 7–14	35,000	
November 22	Furman*	No. 10	Grant Field; Atlanta, GA	W 51–0	20,000	
November 29	Georgia	No. 9	Grant Field; Atlanta, GA (Clean, Old-Fashioned Hate)	W 7–0	38,000	
January 1	vs. No. 12 Kansas*	No. 10	Burdine Stadium; Miami, FL (Orange Bowl)	W 20–14	59,578	
*Non-conference game; Rankings from AP Poll released prior to the game

== Rankings ==
Ranking movements Legend: ██ Increase in ranking ██ Decrease in ranking ( ) = First-place votes
	Week									
Poll	1	2	3	4	5	6	7	8	9	Final
AP	4 (3)	5 (1)	7 (2)	6 (2)	6 (6)	6 (1)	10	9	9	10
