= 1947 Florida Gators football team =

American college football season

1947 Florida Gators football
- Conference: Southeastern Conference
- Record: 4–5–1 (0–3–1 SEC)
- Head coach: Raymond Wolf (2nd season)
- Offensive scheme: Double-wing
- Captain: Charlie Fields
- Home stadium: Florida Field

1947 Southeastern Conference football standings
	Conf.					Overall
Team	W		L		T	W		L		T
No. 13 Ole Miss $	6	–	1	–	0	9	–	2	–	0
No. 10 Georgia Tech	4	–	1	–	0	10	–	1	–	0
No. 6 Alabama	5	–	2	–	0	8	–	3	–	0
Mississippi State	2	–	2	–	0	7	–	3	–	0
Georgia	3	–	3	–	0	7	–	4	–	1
Vanderbilt	3	–	3	–	0	6	–	4	–	0
Tulane	2	–	3	–	2	2	–	5	–	2
LSU	2	–	3	–	1	5	–	3	–	1
Kentucky	2	–	3	–	0	8	–	3	–	0
Tennessee	2	–	3	–	0	5	–	5	–	0
Auburn	1	–	5	–	0	2	–	7	–	0
Florida	0	–	3	–	1	4	–	5	–	1
$ – Conference champion; Rankings from AP Poll

The 1947 Florida Gators football team was an American football team that represented the University of Florida in the Southeastern Conference (SEC) during the 1947 college football season. The season was Raymond Wolf's second as the head coach of the Florida Gators football team. Wolf's 1947 Florida Gators finished with a 4–5–1 overall record and a 0–3–1 record in the SEC, placing last among 12 SEC teams.

On October 18, 1947, the Gators broke a 13-game post-war losing streak, dating back to the final game of the 1945 season, when they upset the 18th-ranked NC State Wolfpack, 7–6, on the Wolfpack's home field in Raleigh, North Carolina. Among the other highlights of the season, the Gators beat the in-state rival Miami Hurricanes in Miami, and ended the season with a 25–7 intersectional victory over the Kansas State Wildcats.

Florida halfback Bobby Forbes was selected by the Associated Press as a second-team player on the 1947 All-SEC football team.

Florida was ranked at No. 74 (out of 500 college football teams) in the final Litkenhous Ratings for 1947.

== Schedule ==
Date	Opponent	Site	Result	Attendance	Source
September 27	vs. Ole Miss	Jacksonville Stadium; Jacksonville, FL	L 6–14	17,000	
October 4	North Texas State*	Florida Field; Gainesville, FL	L 12–20	10,000	
October 11	vs. Auburn	Cramton Bowl; Montgomery, AL (rivalry)	L 14–20	13,000	
October 18	at No. 18 NC State*	Riddick Stadium; Raleigh, NC	W 7–6	18,000	
October 25	North Carolina*^{†}	Florida Field; Gainesville, FL	L 7–35	25,000	
November 1	vs. Furman*	Phillips Field; Tampa, FL	W 34–7	14,000	
November 8	vs. Georgia	Fairfield Stadium; Jacksonville, FL (rivalry)	L 6–34	23,000	
November 15	at Tulane	Tulane Stadium; New Orleans, LA	T 7–7	25,000	
November 21	at Miami (FL)*	Burdine Stadium; Miami, FL (rivalry)	W 7–6	32,102	
November 29	Kansas State*	Florida Field; Gainesville, FL	W 25–7	7,000	
*Non-conference game; ^{†}Homecoming; Rankings from AP Poll released prior to the game
