= 1947 LSU Tigers football team =

American college football season

1947 LSU Tigers football
- Conference: Southeastern Conference
- Record: 5–3–1 (2–3–1 SEC)
- Head coach: Bernie Moore (13th season)
- Home stadium: Tiger Stadium

1947 Southeastern Conference football standings
| | Conf. | | | | | Overall |
| Team | W | | L | | T | W | | L | | T |
|---|---|---|---|---|---|---|---|---|---|---|
| No. 13 Ole Miss $ | 6 | – | 1 | – | 0 | 9 | – | 2 | – | 0 |
| No. 10 Georgia Tech | 4 | – | 1 | – | 0 | 10 | – | 1 | – | 0 |
| No. 6 Alabama | 5 | – | 2 | – | 0 | 8 | – | 3 | – | 0 |
| Mississippi State | 2 | – | 2 | – | 0 | 7 | – | 3 | – | 0 |
| Georgia | 3 | – | 3 | – | 0 | 7 | – | 4 | – | 1 |
| Vanderbilt | 3 | – | 3 | – | 0 | 6 | – | 4 | – | 0 |
| Tulane | 2 | – | 3 | – | 2 | 2 | – | 5 | – | 2 |
| LSU | 2 | – | 3 | – | 1 | 5 | – | 3 | – | 1 |
| Kentucky | 2 | – | 3 | – | 0 | 8 | – | 3 | – | 0 |
| Tennessee | 2 | – | 3 | – | 0 | 5 | – | 5 | – | 0 |
| Auburn | 1 | – | 5 | – | 0 | 2 | – | 7 | – | 0 |
| Florida | 0 | – | 3 | – | 1 | 4 | – | 5 | – | 1 |
$ – Conference champion; Rankings from AP Poll

The 1947 LSU Tigers football team was an American football team that represented Louisiana State University (LSU) as a member of the Southeastern Conference (SEC) during the 1947 college football season. In their 13th year under head coach Bernie Moore, the Tigers compiled an overall record of 5–3–1, with a conference record of 2–3–1, and finished eighth in the SEC.

LSU was ranked at No. 34 (out of 500 college football teams) in the final Litkenhous Ratings for 1947.

== Schedule ==
| Date | Opponent | Rank | Site | Result | Attendance | Source |
|---|---|---|---|---|---|---|
| September 27 | Rice* | | Tiger Stadium; Baton Rouge, LA | W 21–14 | 46,000 | |
| October 4 | at Georgia | | Sanford Stadium; Athens, GA | L 19–35 | 45,000 | |
| October 11 | Texas A&M* | | Tiger Stadium; Baton Rouge, LA (rivalry) | W 19–13 | 35,000 | |
| October 17 | at Boston College | | Braves Field; Boston, MA | W 14–13 | 36,423 | |
| October 26 | No. 19 Vanderbilt^{†} | No. 18 | Tiger Stadium; Baton Rouge, LA | W 19–13 | 42,000 | |
| November 1 | Ole Miss | No. 17 | Tiger Stadium; Baton Rouge, LA (rivalry) | L 18–20 | 46,000 | |
| November 15 | Mississippi State | | Tiger Stadium; Baton Rouge, LA (rivalry) | W 21–6 | 40,000 | |
| November 22 | at No. 8 Alabama | | Denny Stadium; Tuscaloosa, AL (rivalry) | L 12–41 | 25,000 | |
| November 30 | at Tulane | | Tulane Stadium; New Orleans, LA (Battle for the Rag) | T 6–6 | 67,000 | |
*Non-conference game; ^{†}Homecoming; Rankings from AP Poll released prior to the game

== Rankings ==
Ranking movements Legend: ██ Increase in ranking ██ Decrease in ranking — = Not ranked
| | Week | | | | | | | | | |
| Poll | 1 | 2 | 3 | 4 | 5 | 6 | 7 | 8 | 9 | Final |
|---|---|---|---|---|---|---|---|---|---|---|
| AP | — | — | 18 | 17 | — | — | — | — | — | — |

== Personnel ==
- QB Y.A. Tittle
