= 1947 TCU Horned Frogs football team =

American college football season

1947 TCU Horned Frogs football

Delta Bowl, L 9–13 vs. Ole Miss
- Conference: Southwest Conference
- Record: 4–5–2 (2–3–1 SWC)
- Head coach: Dutch Meyer (14th season)
- Offensive scheme: Meyer spread
- Home stadium: Amon G. Carter Stadium

1947 Southwest Conference football standings
	Conf.					Overall
Team	W		L		T	W		L		T
No. 3 SMU $	5	–	0	–	1	9	–	0	–	2
No. 5 Texas	5	–	1	–	0	10	–	1	–	0
No. 18 Rice	4	–	2	–	0	6	–	3	–	1
TCU	2	–	3	–	1	4	–	5	–	2
Arkansas	1	–	4	–	1	6	–	4	–	1
Texas A&M	1	–	4	–	1	3	–	6	–	1
Baylor	1	–	5	–	0	5	–	5	–	0
$ – Conference champion; Rankings from AP Poll

The 1947 TCU Horned Frogs football team was an American football team that represented Texas Christian University (TCU) in the Southwest Conference during the 1947 college football season. In its 14th season under head coach Dutch Meyer, the team compiled a 4–5–2 record (2–3–1 against conference opponents) and outscored its opponents by a total of 114 to 99. TCU lost to Ole Miss by a score of 13–9 in the 1948 Delta Bowl.

TCU was ranked at No. 23 (out of 500 college football teams) in the final Litkenhous Ratings for 1947.

The team played its home games in Amon G. Carter Stadium, which is located on campus in Fort Worth, Texas.

== Schedule ==
Date	Opponent	Site	Result	Attendance	Source
September 20	vs. Kansas*	Blues Stadium; Kansas City, MO	T 0–0	15,000	
September 27	Oklahoma A&M*	Amon G. Carter Stadium; Fort Worth, TX	L 7–14	14,000	
October 4	at Arkansas	Razorback Stadium; Fayetteville, Ar	L 0–6	16,000	
October 10	at Miami (FL)*	Burdine Stadium; Miami, FL	W 19–6	28,686	
October 18	Texas A&M	Amon G. Carter Stadium; Fort Worth, TX (rivalry)	W 26–0	30,000	
October 25	at Oklahoma*	Oklahoma Memorial Stadium; Norman, OK	W 20–7	23,000	
November 1	at Baylor	Baylor Stadium; Waco, TX (rivalry)	W 14–7	16,000–17,000	
November 15	at No. 7 Texas	War Memorial Stadium; [Austin, TX (rivalry)	L 0–20	43,000	
November 22	No. 20 Rice	Amon G. Carter Stadium; Fort Worth, TX	L 0–7	5,000	
November 29	No. 3 SMU	Amon G. Carter Stadium; Fort Worth, TX (rivalry)	T 19–19	31,000	
January 1, 1948	vs. No. 12 Ole Miss	Crump Stadium; Memphis, TN (Delta Bowl)	L 9–13	28,800	
*Non-conference game; Rankings from AP Poll released prior to the game
