= 1947 Mississippi State Maroons football team =

American college football season

1947 Mississippi State Maroons football
- Conference: Southeastern Conference
- Record: 7–3 (2–2 SEC)
- Head coach: Allyn McKeen (8th season)
- Home stadium: Scott Field

1947 Southeastern Conference football standings
	Conf.					Overall
Team	W		L		T	W		L		T
No. 13 Ole Miss $	6	–	1	–	0	9	–	2	–	0
No. 10 Georgia Tech	4	–	1	–	0	10	–	1	–	0
No. 6 Alabama	5	–	2	–	0	8	–	3	–	0
Mississippi State	2	–	2	–	0	7	–	3	–	0
Georgia	3	–	3	–	0	7	–	4	–	1
Vanderbilt	3	–	3	–	0	6	–	4	–	0
Tulane	2	–	3	–	2	2	–	5	–	2
LSU	2	–	3	–	1	5	–	3	–	1
Kentucky	2	–	3	–	0	8	–	3	–	0
Tennessee	2	–	3	–	0	5	–	5	–	0
Auburn	1	–	5	–	0	2	–	7	–	0
Florida	0	–	3	–	1	4	–	5	–	1
$ – Conference champion; Rankings from AP Poll

The 1947 Mississippi State Maroons football team was an American football team that represented Mississippi State College in the Southeastern Conference (SEC) during the 1947 college football season. In its eighth season under head coach Allyn McKeen, the team compiled a 7–3 record (2–2 against SEC opponents), finished fourth in the SEC, and outscored opponents by a total of 169 to 89.

Three Mississippi State players received honors from the Associated Press (AP) or United Press (UP) on the 1947 All-SEC football team: tackle Dub Garrett (AP-1, UP); quarterback Harper Davis (AP-3); and halfback Shorty McWilliams (AP-1).

Mississippi State was ranked at No. 44 (out of 500 college football teams) in the final Litkenhous Ratings for 1947.

== Schedule ==
Date	Opponent	Site	Result	Attendance	Source
September 26	at Chattanooga*	Chamberlain Field; Chattanooga, TN	W 19–0	10,000	
October 4	at Michigan State*	Macklin Field; East Lansing, MI	L 0–7	22,562	
October 11	at San Francisco*	Kezar Stadium; San Francisco, CA	W 21–14	22,000	
October 18	Duquesne*	Scott Field; Starkville, MS	W 34–0	10,000	
October 25	Hardin–Simmons*	Scott Field; Starkville, MS	W 27–7	9,000	
November 1	at Tulane	Tulane Stadium; New Orleans, LA	W 20–0	35,000	
November 8	at Auburn	Legion Field; Birmingham, AL	W 14–0	20,000	
November 15	at LSU	Tiger Stadium; Baton Rouge, LA (rivalry)	L 6–21	40,000	
November 22	Mississippi Southern*	Scott Field; Starkville, MS	W 14–7	5,000	
November 29	No. 15 Ole Miss	Scott Field; Starkville, MS (Egg Bowl)	L 14–33	27,000	
*Non-conference game; Rankings from AP Poll released prior to the game
