= Harold Drew =

American sports coach (1894–1979)

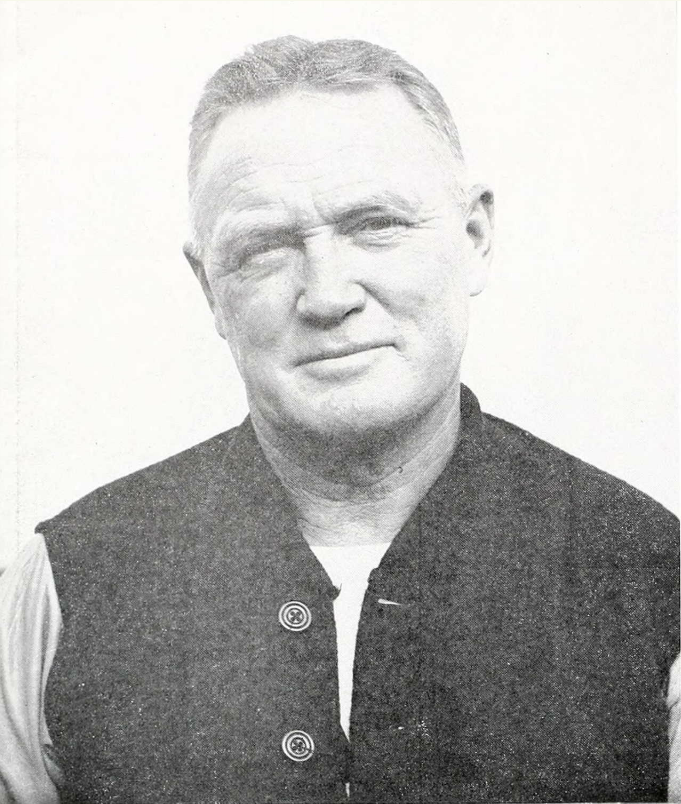
- Drew from the 1949 "Corolla"

Biographical details
- Born: November 9, 1894; Dyer Brook, Maine, U.S.
- Died: October 20, 1979 (aged 84); Tuscaloosa, Alabama, U.S.

Playing career

Football
- 1915: Bates
- 1916–1917: Springfield
- 1919: Springfield

Coaching career (HC unless noted)

Football
- 1921–1923: Trinity (CT)
- 1924–1927: Birmingham–Southern
- 1928: Chattanooga (assistant)
- 1929–1930: Chattanooga
- 1931–1941: Alabama (assistant)
- 1945: Alabama (assistant)
- 1946: Ole Miss
- 1947–1954: Alabama

Basketball
- 1920–1924: Trinity (CT)
- 1924–1928: Birmingham–Southern
- 1928–1931: Chattanooga

Head coaching record
- Overall: 96–68–14 (football); 77–86 (basketball)
- Bowls: 1–2

Accomplishments and honors

Championships
- Football; 1 SIAA (1929); 1 SEC (1953)

Awards
- Football; SEC Coach of the Year (1952)

Harold Delbert "Red" Drew (November 9, 1894 – October 20, 1979) was an American football, basketball, and track and field coach for over 40 years. He was the head coach of the Alabama Crimson Tide football team from 1947 to 1954, compiling a 54–28–7 record and leading the team to appearances in the Sugar, Orange and Cotton Bowls. He also served as an assistant football coach at Alabama from 1931 to 1941, including the undefeated 1934 team that won the national championship and played in the 1935 Rose Bowl. Drew also served as Alabama's track and field coach for 23 seasons continuing into the mid-1960s. He was inducted into the Alabama Sports Hall of Fame in 1971.

A native of Maine, Drew received degrees from Bates College in Maine and Springfield College in Massachusetts. He played football for both schools. He also played baseball and also competed as a pole vaulter at Bates College. His athletic career was interrupted by service as a naval aviator during World War I.

Drew began his coaching career as an athletic director, football coach, and basketball coach at Trinity College (1920–1924), Birmingham–Southern College (1924–1927) and the University of Chattanooga, now known as the University of Tennessee at Chattanooga (1927–1931). In 1931, he began his long association with the University of Alabama, serving as the head track coach and assistant football coach through the 1930s. He spent three years in the United States Navy during World War II and was placed in charge of "fleet recreation" on the island of Saipan. After the war, he served as the head coach of the Ole Miss Rebels football team in 1946.

== Early years ==
Drew was born in 1894 in Dyer Brook, Maine, and raised in Patten, Maine. He attended Bates College in Lewiston, Maine, where he was played for the school's football and baseball teams and competed in the pole vault for the track team. Known as "Spud" Drew during his college years, Drew received his degree from Bates in 1916.

In 1916, Drew enrolled for graduate studies at Springfield College in Springfield, Massachusetts. While attending Springfield College, he played football and was the captain of the school's 1917 football team.

In November 1917, Drew joined the United States Navy, serving in the Canal Zone as an ensign and a naval aviator during World War I from 1917 to 1918. After the war, Drew returned to Springfield where he played for the school's 1919 football team. He received a B.P.E. degree from Springfield in 1920.

== Coaching career ==
=== Trinity and Birmingham–Southern ===
Drew began his coaching career as the athletic director and head football and basketball coach at Trinity College in Hartford, Connecticut from 1920 to 1924. Drew left Trinity to accept a position as the athletic director and head football coach at Birmingham–Southern College. He was the football coach at Birmingham–Southern from 1924 to 1927. Drew also coached basketball at Trinity (1920–1924) and Birmingham–Southern (1924–1928).

=== Chattanooga ===
In 1928, Drew accepted a position as an assistant football coach at the University of Chattanooga, now known as the University of Tennessee at Chattanooga. He was hired at Chattanooga by athletic director and football coach Frank Thomas, with whom Drew would remain associated for most of the following 25 years. When Thomas accepted a coaching position at the University of Georgia in 1929, Drew took over as Chattanooga's athletic director and head coach of the football and basketball teams. Drew coached Chattanooga's football team to Southern Intercollegiate Athletic Association championships in 1929 and 1930. He also coached Chattanooga's basketball team from 1928 to 1931.

=== Assistant at Alabama ===
In January 1931, Drew was hired as an assistant coach under the Alabama Crimson Tide's newly appointed head coach Frank Thomas. This began Drew's long association with the University of Alabama. He served as an assistant football coach for the Crimson Tide from 1931 to 1945, with the exceptions of the 1942, 1943 and 1944 seasons. As an assistant coach at Alabama, Drew was responsible for coaching the ends. He was the position coach for Don Hutson, who went on to become the first star wide receiver in the National Football League. The ends mentored by Drew also included Holt Rast and Bear Bryant. The undefeated 1934 Alabama Crimson Tide football team won the national championship with ends Hutson and Bryant as key players. In addition to his duties as an assistant football coach, Drew also coached Alabama's track team.

=== World War II ===
Drew missed the 1942, 1943 and 1944 seasons at Alabama while serving in the United States Navy. With the United States entering World War II, Drew enlisted in the Navy in May 1942 and held the rank of lieutenant commander. In the summer of 1942, he completed a course at the U.S. Naval Academy designed for athletic directors, coaches and physical training experts. He was thereafter assigned as the athletic director at the Naval Air Station in Miami, Florida. He ultimately deployed to the Pacific Ocean theater where he was placed in charge of "fleet recreation" on the island of Saipan. He was discharged from the Navy and returned to Alabama in May 1945.

=== Ole Miss ===
On January 14, 1946, the University of Mississippi announced that it had signed Drew to a three-year contract to succeed Harry Mehre as the head football coach for the Ole Miss Rebels. Drew led Ole Miss to a 2–7 record in his one year as head coach.

=== Alabama ===
In January 1947, Drew was hired to succeed Frank Thomas as the head football coach of the Alabama Crimson Tide. In his first year, he led the 1947 Alabama team to an 8–3 record, a berth in the 1948 Sugar Bowl, and a number eight ranking in the final AP poll. In November 1948, he led Alabama to a victory over Georgia Tech that The Tuscaloosa News called "the upset of the season." The following month, he led the Crimson Tide to a 55–0 victory over Auburn, a score which remains the most lopsided in the history of the Alabama–Auburn football rivalry. In August 1951, Drew led the East team to a 15–6 victory in the Third Annual All-American High School game in Memphis. He also led the 1952 team to a 10–2 record and a 61–6 victory over Syracuse in the 1953 Orange Bowl. Alabama's 55-point margin of victory remains the largest in the history of the Orange Bowl; it was also the highest point total in Orange Bowl history until West Virginia scored 70 points in the 2012 Orange Bowl. When the Orange Bowl bid was announced in November 1952, former Alabama athletes organized to urge the University to sign Drew to a long-term contract, and The Tuscaloosa News reported:

"The invitation also is a fine tribute to Coach Harold (Red) Drew and his staff. We doubt if there is a coaching staff in the country that has done a better job than the one done by the Crimson Tide staff in getting Alabama ready for the Georgia Tech and Maryland games."

Drew was selected as the SEC Coach of the Year in 1952, and he was given a two-year contract extension in December 1952. The following year, he led the 1953 team to a Southeastern Conference (SEC) championship and a berth in the 1954 Cotton Bowl Classic. However, the 1954 team finished in sixth place in the SEC with a 4–5–2 record. With the poor showing of the 1954 team, rumors spread that Drew would not return as the head coach. On December 2, 1954, Drew was removed as the head coach and replaced with J. B. Whitworth. Drew was retained as Alabama's head track coach and associate professor of physical education. Drew was Alabama's track coach for 23 seasons and through at least 1964.

At the end of his tenure as Alabama's head football coach, Drew's salary was reported to have been $12,000 per year. In eight years as Alabama's head football coach, Drew compiled a 54–28–7 record.

Drew was inducted into the Alabama Sports Hall of Fame in 1970.

== Personal ==
Drew was married to Marion Darnley in 1922. They had three children: Polly, Harold, Jr., and Bobby. Drew remained in Tuscaloosa, Alabama after retiring. He died there in 1979 at age 84.

== Head coaching record ==
=== Football ===
Year	Team	Overall	Conference	Standing	Bowl/playoffs	Coaches^{#}	AP^{°}
Trinity Bantams (Independent) (1921–1923)
1921	Trinity	2–4–1					
1922	Trinity	4–3					
1923	Trinity	2–5					
Trinity:		8–12–1					
Birmingham–Southern Panthers (Independent) (1924)
1924	Birmingham–Southern	4–4–1					
Birmingham–Southern Panthers (Southern Intercollegiate Athletic Association) (1925–1927)
1925	Birmingham–Southern	7–3–1	3–1–1	T–5th			
1926	Birmingham–Southern	5–3–2	3–1–2	T–4th			
1927	Birmingham–Southern	3–6	2–4	T–14th			
Birmingham–Southern:		19–16–4					
Chattanooga Moccasins (Southern Intercollegiate Athletic Association) (1929–1930)
1929	Chattanooga	8–2	7–0	1st			
1930	Chattanooga	5–3–2	3–2–1	T–11th			
Chattanooga:		13–5–2	10–2–1				
Ole Miss Rebels (Southeastern Conference) (1946)
1946	Ole Miss	2–7	1–6	11th			
Ole Miss:		2–7	1–6				
Alabama Crimson Tide (Southeastern Conference) (1947–1954)
1947	Alabama	8–3	5–2	3rd	L Sugar		6
1948	Alabama	6–4–1	4–4–1	6th			
1949	Alabama	6–3–1	4–3–1	6th			
1950	Alabama	9–2	6–2	3rd		17	16
1951	Alabama	5–6	3–5	T–7th			
1952	Alabama	10–2	4–2	4th	W Orange	9	9
1953	Alabama	6–3–3	4–0–3	1st	L Cotton	11	13
1954	Alabama	4–5–2	3–3–2	6th			
Alabama:		54–28–7	33–21–7				
Total:		96–68–14					
National championship Conference title Conference division title or championship game berth
^{#}Rankings from final Coaches Poll.; ^{°}Rankings from final AP Poll.
