= 1947 Rice Owls football team =

American college football season

1947 Rice Owls football
- Conference: Southwest Conference

Ranking
- AP: No. 18
- Record: 6–3–1 (4–2 SWC)
- Head coach: Jess Neely (8th season)
- Home stadium: Rice Field

1947 Southwest Conference football standings
	Conf.					Overall
Team	W		L		T	W		L		T
No. 3 SMU $	5	–	0	–	1	9	–	0	–	2
No. 5 Texas	5	–	1	–	0	10	–	1	–	0
No. 18 Rice	4	–	2	–	0	6	–	3	–	1
TCU	2	–	3	–	1	4	–	5	–	2
Arkansas	1	–	4	–	1	6	–	4	–	1
Texas A&M	1	–	4	–	1	3	–	6	–	1
Baylor	1	–	5	–	0	5	–	5	–	0
$ – Conference champion; Rankings from AP Poll

The 1947 Rice Owls football team was an American football that represented Rice Institute in the Southwest Conference during the 1947 college football season. In its eighth season under head coach Jess Neely, the team compiled a 6–3–1 record (4–2 against conference opponents), finished third in the conference, was ranked No. 18 in the final AP Poll (No. 7 in the final Litkenhous Ratings), and outscored opponents by a total of 202 to 74.

Quarterback Tobin Rote led the team on offense. Two Rice players received first-team honors from the Associated Press on the 1947 All-Southwest Conference football team: center Joe Watson and guard J.W. Magee.

The played its home games at Rice Field in Houston.

== Schedule ==
Date	Opponent	Rank	Site	Result	Attendance	Source
September 27	at LSU*		Tiger Stadium; Baton Rouge, LA	L 14–21	46,000	
October 4	at USC*		Los Angeles Memorial Coliseum; Los Angeles, CA	T 7–7	64,231	
October 11	Tulane*	No. 16	Rice Field; Houston, TX	W 33–0	28,000	
October 18	at SMU	No. 15	Ownby Stadium; Dallas, TX (rivalry)	L 0–14	23,000	
October 25	at No. 3 Texas		War Memorial Stadium; Austin, TX (rivalry)	L 0–12	48,000	
November 1	Texas Tech*		Rice Field; Houston, TX	W 40–7	16,000	
November 8	Arkansas^{†}		Rice Field; Houston, TX	W 26–0	26,000	
November 15	Texas A&M		Rice Field; Houston, TX	W 41–7	31,000	
November 22	at TCU	No. 20	Amon G. Carter Stadium; Fort Worth, TX	W 7–0	5,000	
November 29	Baylor	No. 18	Rice Field; Houston, TX	W 34–6	20,000	
*Non-conference game; ^{†}Homecoming; Rankings from AP Poll released prior to the game

== Rankings ==
Ranking movements Legend: ██ Increase in ranking ██ Decrease in ranking — = Not ranked
	Week									
Poll	1	2	3	4	5	6	7	8	9	Final
AP	16	15	—	—	—	—	20	18	17	18
