= 1947 Auburn Tigers football team =

American college football season

1947 Auburn Tigers football
- Conference: Southeastern Conference
- Record: 2–7 (1–5 SEC)
- Head coach: Carl M. Voyles (4th season)
- Home stadium: Auburn Stadium; Legion Field; Cramton Bowl

1947 Southeastern Conference football standings
	Conf.					Overall
Team	W		L		T	W		L		T
No. 13 Ole Miss $	6	–	1	–	0	9	–	2	–	0
No. 10 Georgia Tech	4	–	1	–	0	10	–	1	–	0
No. 6 Alabama	5	–	2	–	0	8	–	3	–	0
Mississippi State	2	–	2	–	0	7	–	3	–	0
Georgia	3	–	3	–	0	7	–	4	–	1
Vanderbilt	3	–	3	–	0	6	–	4	–	0
Tulane	2	–	3	–	2	2	–	5	–	2
LSU	2	–	3	–	1	5	–	3	–	1
Kentucky	2	–	3	–	0	8	–	3	–	0
Tennessee	2	–	3	–	0	5	–	5	–	0
Auburn	1	–	5	–	0	2	–	7	–	0
Florida	0	–	3	–	1	4	–	5	–	1
$ – Conference champion; Rankings from AP Poll

The 1947 Auburn Tigers football team represented Auburn University in the 1947 college football season. It was the Tigers' 56th overall and 15th season as a member of the Southeastern Conference (SEC). The team was led by head coach Carl M. Voyles, in his fourth year, and played their home games at Auburn Stadium in Auburn, the Cramton Bowl in Montgomery and Legion Field in Birmingham, Alabama. They finished the season with a record of two wins and seven losses (2–7 overall, 1–5 in the SEC). Auburn was ranked at No. 114 (out of 500 college football teams) in the final Litkenhous Ratings for 1947.

To date, 1947 is the last season that the Tigers did not play in-state archrival Alabama.

== Schedule ==
Date	Opponent	Site	Result	Attendance	Source
September 27	Mississippi Southern*	Cramton Bowl; Montgomery, AL	L 13–19	15,000	
October 4	Louisiana Tech*^{†}	Auburn Stadium; Auburn, AL	W 14–0	11,000	
October 11	Florida	Cramton Bowl; Montgomery, AL (rivalry)	W 20–14	13,000	
October 18	at Georgia Tech	Grant Field; Atlanta, GA (rivalry)	L 7–27	37,000	
October 25	at Tulane	Tulane Stadium; New Orleans, LA (rivalry)	L 0–40	30,000	
November 1	at Vanderbilt	Dudley Field; Nashville, TN	L 0–28	18,000	
November 8	Mississippi State	Legion Field; Birmingham, AL	L 0–14	20,000	
November 15	vs. Georgia	Memorial Stadium; Columbus, GA (rivalry)	L 6–28	22,000	
November 22	at Clemson*	Memorial Stadium; Clemson, SC (rivalry)	L 18–34	11,000	
*Non-conference game; ^{†}Homecoming
