= 1947 Baylor Bears football team =

American college football season

1947 Baylor Bears football
- Conference: Southwest Conference
- Record: 5–5 (1–5 SWC)
- Head coach: Bob Woodruff (1st season)
- Captain: James W. Griffin
- Home stadium: Municipal Stadium

1947 Southwest Conference football standings
	Conf.					Overall
Team	W		L		T	W		L		T
No. 3 SMU $	5	–	0	–	1	9	–	0	–	2
No. 5 Texas	5	–	1	–	0	10	–	1	–	0
No. 18 Rice	4	–	2	–	0	6	–	3	–	1
TCU	2	–	3	–	1	4	–	5	–	2
Arkansas	1	–	4	–	1	6	–	4	–	1
Texas A&M	1	–	4	–	1	3	–	6	–	1
Baylor	1	–	5	–	0	5	–	5	–	0
$ – Conference champion; Rankings from AP Poll

The 1947 Baylor Bears football team was an American football team that represented Baylor University in the Southwest Conference (SWC) during the 1947 college football season.

In its first season under head coach Bob Woodruff, the team compiled a 5–5 record (1–5 against conference opponents), finished in last place in the conference, and was outscored by a total of 138 to 128. The team played its home games at Municipal Stadium in Waco, Texas. James W. Griffin was the team captain.

The 1947 season featured great backs across the Southwest Conference. Baylor lost games to SMU (No. 3 in the final AP Poll) led by halfback Doak Walker; Texas (No. 5 in the final AP Poll) led by quarterback Bobby Layne; and Rice (No. 18 in the final AP Poll) led by quarterback Tobin Rote. It won against an Arkansas team led by halfback Clyde Scott who was later inducted into the College Football Hall of Fame.

Baylor was ranked at No. 43 (out of 500 college football teams) in the final Litkenhous Ratings for 1947.

== Schedule ==
Date	Opponent	Rank	Site	Result	Attendance	Source
September 19	Stephen F. Austin*		Municipal Stadium; Waco, TX	W 34–0	8,000–9,000	
September 26	at Miami (FL)*		Burdine Stadium; Miami, FL	W 18–7	31,717	
October 11	Arkansas		Municipal Stadium; Waco, TX	W 17–9	12,000–15,000	
October 18	at Texas Tech*		Tech Stadium; Lubbock, TX (rivalry)	W 32–6	13,000–13,106	
October 25	at Texas A&M	No. 17	Kyle Field; College Station, TX (rivalry)	L 0–24	22,000	
November 1	TCU^{†}		Municipal Stadium; Waco, TX (rivalry)	L 7–14	16,000–17,000	
November 8	at No. 8 Texas		Memorial Stadium; Austin, TX (rivalry)	L 7–28	39,000	
November 15	at Tulsa*		Skelly Stadium; Tulsa, OK	W 7–6	12,500	
November 22	No. 3 SMU		Municipal Stadium; Waco, TX	L 0–10	12,000	
November 29	at No. 18 Rice		Rice Field; Houston, TX	L 6–34	20,000	
*Non-conference game; ^{†}Homecoming; Rankings from AP Poll released prior to the game

== Rankings ==
Ranking movements Legend: ██ Increase in ranking ██ Decrease in ranking — = Not ranked
	Week									
Poll	1	2	3	4	5	6	7	8	9	Final
AP	—	—	17	—	—	—	—	—	—	—
