= 1947 Texas Longhorns football team =

American college football season

1947 Texas Longhorns football

Sugar Bowl champion

Sugar Bowl, W 27–7 vs. Alabama
- Conference: Southwest Conference

Ranking
- AP: No. 5
- Record: 10–1 (5–1 SWC)
- Head coach: Blair Cherry (1st season)
- Home stadium: War Memorial Stadium

1947 Southwest Conference football standings
	Conf.					Overall
Team	W		L		T	W		L		T
No. 3 SMU $	5	–	0	–	1	9	–	0	–	2
No. 5 Texas	5	–	1	–	0	10	–	1	–	0
No. 18 Rice	4	–	2	–	0	6	–	3	–	1
TCU	2	–	3	–	1	4	–	5	–	2
Arkansas	1	–	4	–	1	6	–	4	–	1
Texas A&M	1	–	4	–	1	3	–	6	–	1
Baylor	1	–	5	–	0	5	–	5	–	0
$ – Conference champion; Rankings from AP Poll

The 1947 Texas Longhorns football team was an American football team that represented the University of Texas as a member of the Southwest Conference (SWC) during the 1947 college football season. In its first season under head coach Blair Cherry, the team compiled a 10–1 record (5–1 against SWC opponents), won the SWC championship, and outscored opponents by a total of 292 to 74. The team lost to SMU and defeated Alabama in the 1948 Sugar Bowl.

Bobby Layne was a consensus selection as the quarterback for the 1947 College Football All-America Team. He also finished sixth in the 1947 voting for the Heisman Trophy. Tackle Richard Harris was also selected as a first-team All-American by the Associated Press (AP).

Three Texas players were selected by the AP as first-team honorees on the 1947 All-Southwest Conference football team: Layne at quarterback; Harris at tackle; and Max Bumgardner at end.

== Schedule ==
Date	Time	Opponent	Rank	Site	Result	Attendance	Source
September 20	2:30 p.m.	Texas Tech*		Memorial Stadium; Austin, TX (rivalry)	W 33–0	30,000	
September 27	3:00 p.m.	at Oregon*		Multnomah Stadium; Portland, OR	W 38–13	30,000	
October 4	2:30 p.m.	No. 19 North Carolina*		Memorial Stadium; Austin, TX	W 34–0	47,000	
October 11	2:30 p.m.	vs. No. 15 Oklahoma*	No. 3	Cotton Bowl; Dallas, TX (Red River Shootout)	W 34–14	46,000	
October 18	2:30 p.m.	vs. Arkansas	No. 3	Crump Stadium; Memphis, TN (rivalry)	W 21–6	28,000	
October 25	2:30 p.m.	Rice	No. 3	Memorial Stadium; Austin, TX (rivalry)	W 12–0	48,400	
November 1	2:30 p.m.	at No. 8 SMU	No. 3	Cotton Bowl; Dallas, TX	L 13–14	50,000	
November 8	2:30 p.m.	Baylor	No. 8	Memorial Stadium; Austin, TX (rivalry)	W 28–7	34,000	
November 15	2:30 p.m.	TCU	No. 7	Memorial Stadium; Austin, TX (rivalry)	W 20–0	43,000	
November 27	2:00 p.m.	at Texas A&M	No. 7	Kyle Field; College Station, TX (rivalry)	W 32–13	43,000	
January 1, 1948		vs. No. 6 Alabama*	No. 5	Tulane Stadium; New Orleans, LA (Sugar Bowl)	W 27–7	73,000	
*Non-conference game; Rankings from AP Poll released prior to the game

== Rankings ==
Ranking movements Legend: ██ Increase in ranking ██ Decrease in ranking ( ) = First-place votes
	Week									
Poll	1	2	3	4	5	6	7	8	9	Final
AP	3 (15)	3 (10)	3 (10)	3 (25)	8	7	7	7	6 (2)	5

== Game summaries ==
=== Vs. Texas Tech ===
Texas Tech Red Raiders (0–0) vs. Texas Longhorns (0–0)

Quarter	1	2	3	4	Total
Texas Tech	0	0	0	0	0
Texas	20	0	13	0	33

at War Memorial Stadium • Austin, TX

- Date: Saturday, September 20, 1947
- Game time: 2:30 PM CDT
- Game weather: Hot & dry
- Game attendance: 30,000
- Box Score

Game information

First Quarter

- (?:??) UT – Layne 1 yard run (???), UT ?–0
- (?:??) UT – Gillory 53 yard run (???), UT ?–0
- (?:??) UT – Pyle 46 yard run (???), UT 20–0

Third Quarter

- (?:??) UT – Gillory 41 yard run (???), UT ??–0
- (?:??) UT – Fleming 2 yard run (???), UT 33–0

Statistics	TTU	TEX
First downs	7	11
Total yards	84	449
Rushes/yards	24/25	54/335
Passing yards	59	114
Passing: Comp–Att–Int	7-21-1	8-12-1
Time of possession		

Team	Category	Player	Statistics
Texas Tech	Passing	TEAM	7-21, 59 yards, 1 INT
Texas Tech	Rushing	TEAM	24 car, 25 yards
Texas Tech	Receiving	TEAM	7 rec, 59 yards
Texas	Passing	Bobby Layne	5-6, 69 yards
Texas	Rushing	Byron Gillory	6 car, 125 yards, 2 TDs
Texas	Receiving	Dale Schwartzkopf	2 rec, 41 yards

=== At Oregon ===
Texas Longhorns (1–0) vs. Oregon Ducks (1–0)

Quarter	1	2	3	4	Total
Texas	0	20	0	18	38
Oregon	0	0	6	7	13

at Multnomah Stadium • Portland, OR

- Date: Saturday, September 27, 1947
- Game time: 3:00 PM CDT
- Game weather: Clear & warm
- Game attendance: 28,689
- Box Score

Game information

Second Quarter

- (?:??) UT – Gillory 25 yard pass from Layne (???), UT ?–0
- (?:??) UT – Gillory 13 yard pass from Layne (???), UT ??–0
- (?:??) UT – Bumgardner 48 yard pass from Layne (???), UT 20–0

Third Quarter

- (?:??) UO – Milue 30 yard pass from Van Brocklin (kick failed), UT 20–6

Fourth Quarter

- (?:??) UT – Clay 3 yard run (kick failed), UT 26–6
- (?:??) UT – Samnuels 41 yard punt return (kick failed), UT 32–6
- (?:??) UT – Blount 11 yard pass from Campbell (kick failed), UT 38–6
- (0:15) UO – Robinson 4 yard pass from Van Brocklin (Newquist kick), UT 38–13

Statistics	TEX	ORE
First downs	9	12
Total yards	312	233
Rushes/yards	34/163	40/114
Passing yards	149	114
Passing: Comp–Att–Int	7-13-1	10-28-1
Time of possession		

Team	Category	Player	Statistics
Texas	Passing	Bobby Layne	6-11, 138 yards, 3 TDs, 1 INT
Texas	Rushing	Perry Samuels	3 car, 44 yards, 1 TD
Texas	Receiving	Byron Gillory	4 rec, 69 yards, 2 TDs
Oregon	Passing	TEAM	10-28, 119 yards, 2 TDs, 1 INT
Oregon	Rushing	TEAM	40 car, 114 yards
Oregon	Receiving	TEAM	10 rec, 119 yards, 2 TDs

=== Vs. North Carolina ===
North Carolina Tar Heels (1–0) vs. Texas Longhorns (2–0)

Quarter	1	2	3	4	Total
No. 19 North Carolina	0	0	0	0	0
Texas	7	13	0	14	34

at War Memorial Stadium • Austin, TX

- Date: Saturday, Oct 4, 1947
- Game time: 2:30 PM CDT
- Game weather: Warm & dry
- Game attendance: 47,000
- Box Score

Game information

First Quarter

- (?:??) UT – Gillory 44 yard pass from Layne (Guess kick), UT 7–0

Second Quarter

- (?:??) UT – Blount 28 yard pass from Jones (???), UT ??–0
- (?:??) UT – Landry 1 yard run (???), UT 20–0

Fourth Quarter

- (?:??) UT – Clay 1 run (Guess kick), UT 27–0
- (?:??) UT – Clay 1 run (Guess kick), UT 34–0

Statistics	UNC	TEX
First downs	12	19
Total yards	268	417
Rushes/yards	24/88	52/226
Passing yards	180	191
Passing: Comp–Att–Int	10-20-3	8-15-3
Time of possession		

Team	Category	Player	Statistics
UNC	Passing	TEAM	10-20, 180 yards, 3 INTs
UNC	Rushing	TEAM	24 car, 88 yards
UNC	Receiving	TEAM	10 rec, 180 yards
Texas	Passing	Bobby Layne	6-11, 155 yards, 1 TD, 2 INTs
Texas	Rushing	Tom Landry	17 car, 91 yards, 1 TD
Texas	Receiving	Byron Gillory	1 rec, 110 yards, 1 TD

=== Vs. Oklahoma ===
Oklahoma Sooners (2–0) vs. Texas Longhorns (3–0)

Quarter	1	2	3	4	Total
No. 15 Oklahoma	0	7	0	7	14
No. 3 Texas	7	7	7	13	34

at Cotton Bowl • Dallas, TX

- Date: Saturday, October 11, 1947
- Game time: 2:30 PM CDT
- Game weather: Clear
- Game attendance: 46,000
- Box Score

Game information

First Quarter

- (?:??) UT – Gillory 13 yard run (Guess kick), UT 7–0

Second Quarter

- (?:??) OU – Mitchell 72 yard run (Owen kick), Tied 7–7
- (?:??) UT – Clay 1 yard run (Guess kick), UT 14–7

Third Quarter

- (?:??) UT – Canady 4 yard run (Guess kick), UT 21–7

Fourth Quarter

- (?:??) UT – Clay 3 yard run (???), UT ??–7
- (?:??) UT – McCall 28 yard pass from Layne (???), UT 34–7
- (?:??) OU – Mitchell 3 yard run (Owen kick), UT 34–14

Statistics	OU	TEX
First downs	11	16
Total yards	270	306
Rushes/yards	48/263	49/177
Passing yards	7	129
Passing: Comp–Att–Int	1-3-1	8-11-0
Time of possession		

Team	Category	Player	Statistics
Oklahoma	Passing	TEAM	1–3, 7 yards, 1 INT
Oklahoma	Rushing	TEAM	48 car, 263 yards, 2 TDs
Oklahoma	Receiving	TEAM	1 rec, 7 yards
Texas	Passing	Bobby Layne	8–11, 129 yards, 1 TD
Texas	Rushing	Jim Canady	13 car, 65 yards, 1 TD
Texas	Receiving	Jim Canady	2 rec, 56 yards

=== Vs. Arkansas ===
Arkansas Razorbacks (3–1) vs. Texas Longhorns (4–0)

Quarter	1	2	3	4	Total
Arkansas	6	0	0	0	6
No. 3 Texas	0	14	0	7	21

at Crump Stadium • Memphis, TN

- Date: Saturday, October 18, 1947
- Game time: 2:30 PM CDT
- Game weather: Rainy
- Game attendance: 28,080
- Box Score

Game information

First Quarter

- (?:??) UA – Scott 47 yard rush (kick failed), UA 6–0

Second Quarter

- (?:??) UT – Clay 1 yard run (Guess kick), UT 7–6
- (?:??) UT – Jones 1 yard run (Guess kick), UT 14–6

Fourth Quarter

- (10:05) UT – Jones 1 yard run (Guess kick), UT 21–6

Statistics	ARK	TEX
First downs	3	18
Total yards	109	303
Rushes/yards	18/71	67/267
Passing yards	38	36
Passing: Comp–Att–Int	4-8-1	4-5-0
Time of possession		

Team	Category	Player	Statistics
Arkansas	Passing	TEAM	4-8, 38 yards, 1 INT
Arkansas	Rushing	TEAM	18 car, 71 yards, 1 TD
Arkansas	Receiving	TEAM	4 rec, 38 yards
Texas	Passing	Bobby Layne	4-5, 35 yards
Texas	Rushing	Jim Canady	17 car, 69 yards
Texas	Receiving	Max Bumgardner	2 rec, 23 yards

=== Vs. Rice ===
Rice Owls (1–2-1) vs. Texas Longhorns (5–0)

Quarter	1	2	3	4	Total
Rice	0	0	0	0	0
No. 3 Texas	6	0	0	6	12

at War Memorial Stadium • Austin, TX

- Date: Saturday, October 25, 1947
- Game time: 2:30 PM CDT
- Game weather: Fair & warm
- Game attendance: 48,400
- Box Score

Game information

First Quarter

- (?:??) UT – Bumgardner 18 yard pass from Layne (kick failed), UT 6–0

Fourth Quarter

- (?:??) UT – Canady 3 yard run (kick failed), UT 12–0

Statistics	RICE	TEX
First downs	10	12
Total yards	146	220
Rushes/yards	37/96	53/160
Passing yards	50	60
Passing: Comp–Att–Int	4-15-4	5-15-1
Time of possession		

Team	Category	Player	Statistics
Rice	Passing	TEAM	4–15, 50 yards, 4 INTs
Rice	Rushing	TEAM	37 car, 96 yards
Rice	Receiving	TEAM	4 rec, 50 yards
Texas	Passing	Bobby Layne	5-14, 60 yards, 1 TD, 1 INT
Texas	Rushing	Jim Canady	15 car, 81 yards, 1 TD
Texas	Receiving	Max Bumgardner	1 rec, 18 yards, 1 TD

=== At SMU ===
Texas Longhorns (6–0) vs. SMU Mustangs (5–0)

Quarter	1	2	3	4	Total
No. 3 Texas	0	7	0	6	13
No. 8 SMU	7	7	0	0	14

at Cotton Bowl • Dallas, TX

- Date: Saturday, November 1, 1947
- Game time: 2:30 PM CDT
- Game weather: Cloudy & windy
- Game attendance: 50,000
- Box Score

Game information

First Quarter

- (?:??) SMU – Page 6 yard run (kick good), SMU 7–0

Second Quarter

- (?:??) UT – Landry 2 yard run (Guess kick), Tied 7–7
- (?:??) SMU – McKissack 1 yard run (kick good), SMU 14–7

Fourth Quarter

- (?:??) UT – Gillory 14 yard pass from Layne (kick failed), SMU 14–13

Statistics	TEX	SMU
First downs	9	7
Total yards	196	199
Rushes/yards	36/76	49/108
Passing yards	120	91
Passing: Comp–Att–Int	9-15-1	4-7-0
Time of possession		

Team	Category	Player	Statistics
Texas	Passing	Bobby Layne	9–15, 120 yards, 1 TD, 1 INT
Texas	Rushing	Jim Canady	8 car, 25 yards
Texas	Receiving	Ralph Blount	2 rec, 36 yards
SMU	Passing	TEAM	4–7, 91 yards
SMU	Rushing	TEAM	49 car, 108 yards, 1 TD
SMU	Receiving	TEAM	4 rec, 91 yards

=== Vs. Baylor ===
Baylor Bears (4–3) vs. Texas Longhorns (6–1)

Quarter	1	2	3	4	Total
Baylor	7	0	0	0	7
No. 8 Texas	0	14	0	14	28

at War Memorial Stadium • Austin, TX

- Date: Saturday, November 8, 1947
- Game time: 2:30 PM CDT
- Game weather: Clear & cool
- Game attendance: 34,000
- Box Score

Game information

First Quarter

- (?:??) BAY – Crews 15 yard run (Leal kick), BU 7–0

Second Quarter

- (?:??) UT – Borneman 11 yard run (Guess kick), Tied 7–7
- (?:??) UT – Blount 38 yard pass from Layne (Guess kick), UT 14–7

Fourth Quarter

- (?:??) UT – Canady 2 yard run (Guess kick), UT 21–7
- (?:??) UT – Canady 28 yard run (Guess kick), UT 28–7

Statistics	BAY	TEX
First downs	5	18
Total yards	165	426
Rushes/yards	31/151	52/271
Passing yards	14	155
Passing: Comp–Att–Int	2-11-1	11-23-1
Time of possession		

Team	Category	Player	Statistics
Baylor	Passing	TEAM	2–11, 14 yards, 1 INTs
Baylor	Rushing	TEAM	31 car, 151 yards, 1 TD
Baylor	Receiving	TEAM	2 rec, 14 yards
Texas	Passing	Bobby Layne	10–21, 144 yards, 1 TD, 1 INT
Texas	Rushing	Jones Raymond	8 car, 56 yards
Texas	Receiving	Ralph Blount	3 rec, 56 yards, 1 TD

=== Vs. TCU ===
TCU Horned Frogs (4–2-1) vs. Texas Longhorns (7–1)

Quarter	1	2	3	4	Total
TCU	0	0	0	0	0
No. 7 Texas	6	7	0	7	20

at War Memorial Stadium • Austin, TX

- Date: Saturday, November 15, 1947
- Game time: 2:30 PM CDT
- Game weather: Clear & cool
- Game attendance: 43,000
- Box Score

Game information

First Quarter

- (?:??) UT – Canady 3 yard run (kick fail), UT 6–0

Second Quarter

- (?:??) UT – Blount 31 yard pass from Guess (Guess kick), UT 13–0

Fourth Quarter

- (?:??) UT – Schwartzkopf 35 yard blocked punt return (Guess kick), UT 20–0

Statistics	TCU	TEX
First downs	10	19
Total yards	136	326
Rushes/yards	31/104	63/213
Passing yards	32	113
Passing: Comp–Att–Int	2-10-1	8-11-0
Time of possession		

Team	Category	Player	Statistics
TCU	Passing	TEAM	2–10, 32 yards, 1 INT
TCU	Rushing	TEAM	31 car, 104 yards
TCU	Receiving	TEAM	2 rec, 32 yards
Texas	Passing	Bobby Layne	6–9, 61 yards
Texas	Rushing	Tom Landry	12 car, 78 yards
Texas	Receiving	Max Bumgardner	4 rec, 48 yards

=== At Texas A&M ===
Texas Longhorns (8–1) vs. Texas A&M Aggies (3–5-1)

Quarter	1	2	3	4	Total
No. 7 Texas	6	6	14	6	32
Texas A&M	0	0	0	13	13

at Kyle Field • College Station, TX

- Date: Thursday, November 27, 1947
- Game time: 2:00 PM CDT
- Game weather: Clear
- Game attendance: 41,000
- Box Score

Game information

First Quarter

- (?:??) UT – Landry 6 yard run (kick failed), UT 6–0

Second Quarter

- (?:??) UT – Gillory 10 yard run (kick failed), UT 12–0

Third Quarter

- (?:??) UT – Pyle 1 yard run (Guess kick), UT 19–0
- (?:??) UT – Schwartzkopf 20 yard pass from Layne (Guess kick), UT 26–0

Fourth Quarter

- (?:??) A&M – Dusek 4 yard run (???), UT 26–?
- (?:??) A&M – Goode 15 yard pass from Baty (???), UT 26–13
- (?:??) UT – Layne 1 yardrun (kick failed), UT 33–13

Statistics	TEX	TAMU
First downs	18	12
Total yards	288	267
Rushes/yards	48/219	29/36
Passing yards	69	231
Passing: Comp–Att–Int	5-13-1	15-34-2
Time of possession		

Team	Category	Player	Statistics
Texas	Passing	Bobby Layne	4–12, 53 yards, 1 TD, 1 INT
Texas	Rushing	Tom Landry	9 car, 54 yards, 1 TD
Texas	Receiving	Dale Schwartzkopf	1 rec, 20 yards, 1 TD
Texas A&M	Passing	TEAM	15–34, 231 yards, 1 TD, 2 INTs
Texas A&M	Rushing	TEAM	29 car, 36 yards, 1 TD
Texas A&M	Receiving	TEAM	15 rec, 231 yards, 1 TD

=== Vs. Alabama (Sugar Bowl) ===
1948 Sugar Bowl: Alabama Crimson Tide (8–2) vs. Texas Longhorns (9–1)

Quarter	1	2	3	4	Total
No. 6 Alabama	0	7	0	0	7
No. 5 Texas	7	0	7	13	27

at Tulane Stadium • New Orleans, LA

- Date: Thursday, January 1, 1948
- Game attendance: 73,000
- Box Score

Game information

First Quarter

- (?:??) UT – Canady 1 yard run (Guess kick), UT 7–0

Second Quarter

- (?:??) AL – White 7 yard pass from Gimer (Morrow kick), Tied 7–7

Third Quarter

- (?:??) UT – Petrovich blocked punt recovered in endzone (Guess kick), UT 14–7

Fourth Quarter

- (?:??) UT – Holder 17 yard interception return (???), UT ??–7
- (?:??) UT – Layne 1 yard run (???), UT 27–7

Statistics	ALA	TEX
First downs	7	14
Total yards	88	237
Rushing yards	49	51
Passing yards	62	183
Passing: Comp–Att–Int	17-4-2	24-11–0
Time of possession		

Team	Category	Player	Statistics
Alabama	Passing	TEAM	17-4, 62 yards, 1 TD, 2 INTs
Alabama	Rushing	TEAM	49 yards
Alabama	Receiving	TEAM	4 rec, 62 yards
Texas	Passing	TEAM	24–11, 183 yards
Texas	Rushing	TEAM	51 yards
Texas	Receiving	TEAM	11 rec, 183 yards

== Roster ==
- QB Bobby Layne
- DB Tom Landry
- LE Clyde Harville

== Awards and honors ==
Bobby Layne

- Consensus All-American
- Sugar Bowl Most Valuable Player
