= 1947 Vanderbilt Commodores football team =

American college football season

1947 Vanderbilt Commodores football
- Conference: Southeastern Conference
- Record: 6–4 (3–3 SEC)
- Head coach: Red Sanders (5th season)
- Offensive scheme: Single-wing
- Captains: John North; Tex Robertson
- Home stadium: Dudley Field

1947 Southeastern Conference football standings
	Conf.					Overall
Team	W		L		T	W		L		T
No. 13 Ole Miss $	6	–	1	–	0	9	–	2	–	0
No. 10 Georgia Tech	4	–	1	–	0	10	–	1	–	0
No. 6 Alabama	5	–	2	–	0	8	–	3	–	0
Mississippi State	2	–	2	–	0	7	–	3	–	0
Georgia	3	–	3	–	0	7	–	4	–	1
Vanderbilt	3	–	3	–	0	6	–	4	–	0
Tulane	2	–	3	–	2	2	–	5	–	2
LSU	2	–	3	–	1	5	–	3	–	1
Kentucky	2	–	3	–	0	8	–	3	–	0
Tennessee	2	–	3	–	0	5	–	5	–	0
Auburn	1	–	5	–	0	2	–	7	–	0
Florida	0	–	3	–	1	4	–	5	–	1
$ – Conference champion; Rankings from AP Poll

The 1947 Vanderbilt Commodores football team was an American football team that represented Vanderbilt University in the Southeastern Conference (SEC) during the 1947 college football season. In its fifth season under head coach Red Sanders, the team compiled a 6–4 record (3–3 against SEC opponents), tied for fourth place in the SEC, and outscored all opponents by a total of 182 to 85.

Vanderbilt was ranked at No. 31 (out of 500 college football teams) in the final Litkenhous Ratings for 1947. When the AP Poll began releasing its college football ranking on October 6, 1947, Vanderbilt ranked No. 10 for two weeks; they would not rank in the top ten again until the 2025 season, where Vanderbilt defeated No. 10 LSU on October 18, 2025.

== Schedule ==
Date	Opponent	Rank	Site	Result	Attendance	Source
September 27	at Northwestern		Dyche Stadium; Evanston, IL	W 3–0	42,000	
October 4	Alabama		Dudley Field; Nashville, TN	W 14–7	22,000	
October 11	No. 18 Ole Miss	No. 10	Dudley Field; Nashville, TN (rivalry)	W 10–6	22,000	
October 18	No. 20 Kentucky	No. 10	Dudley Field; Nashville, TN (rivalry)	L 0–14	22,500	
October 25	at No. 18 LSU*	No. 19	Tiger Stadium; Baton Rouge, LA	L 13–19	42,000	
November 1	Auburn		Dudley Field; Nashville, TN	W 28–0	18,000	
November 8	Tennessee Tech		Dudley Field; Nashville, TN	W 68–0	16,000	
November 14	at Miami (FL)*		Burdine Stadium; Miami, FL	W 33–7	29,717	
November 22	Maryland*		Dudley Field; Nashville, TN	L 6–20	20,000	
November 29	Tennessee		Shields–Watkins Field; Knoxville, TN (rivalry)	L 7–12	40,000	
*Non-conference game; Rankings from AP Poll released prior to the game

== Rankings ==
Ranking movements Legend: ██ Increase in ranking ██ Decrease in ranking — = Not ranked
	Week									
Poll	1	2	3	4	5	6	7	8	9	Final
AP	10	10	19	—	—	—	—	—	—	—
