= 1948 Delta Bowl =

TCU Horned Frogs	Ole Miss Rebels
(4–4–2)	(8–2)
9	13
Head coach: Dutch Meyer	Head coach: Johnny Vaught
	AP 13
	1	2	3	4	Total
TCU	0	9	0	0	9
Ole Miss	0	0	0	13	13
- Date: January 1, 1948
- Season: 1947
- Stadium: Crump Stadium
- Location: Memphis, Tennessee
- Referee: Harry Viner (SWC; split crew: SWC, SEC)
- Attendance: 28,120

The 1948 Delta Bowl was a college football postseason bowl game between the Ole Miss Rebels and the TCU Horned Frogs. This was the first ever Delta Bowl.

== Background ==
The Rebels won their first ever Southeastern Conference title under first year head coach Johnny Vaught, while playing in their first bowl game since 1936. The Horned Frogs finished 4th in the Southwest Conference, in their first bowl appearance since 1945.

== Game summary ==
After a scoreless first quarter, TCU got onto the board off Ole Miss miscues. Lindy Berry returned an interception 28 yards for the touchdown, making it 7-0. Later in the quarter, an Ole Miss punt was blocked near the end zone, falling out of bounds for a safety. It was 9-0 TCU going into the fourth quarter, in a game with 7 combined turnovers. Ole Miss quarterback Charlie Conerly threw a pass to Joe Johnson, who ran 26 yards for the touchdown, making the score 9-6 after the extra point missed. On TCU's next possession, Bobby Wilson intercepted a pass, giving the Rebels the ball back. Conerly threw to Johnson, the pass falling complete for 52 yards to the TCU 13. Conerly threw a pass to Dixie Howell on the next play to put the Rebels on top 13-9 after the extra point went in. The Horned Frogs could still tie the game, but any hopes of a tie were vanquished when Red Buchanan intercepted a Horned Frog pass at the Rebel 38, sealing the game for the Rebels.

== Aftermath ==
The Horned Frogs did not make another bowl game until 1952. As for the Rebels, they waited until 1953 for their next bowl appearance. Conerly was inducted into the College Football Hall of Fame in 1966.

== Statistics ==
Statistics	Ole Miss	TCU
First downs	16	16
Rushing yards	111	135
Passing yards	187	54
Total yards	298	189
Passing (C-A-I)	12–30–2	6–11–2
Punts–average	4–32.8	5–42.6
Fumbles–lost	1–1	4–2
Penalties–yards	8–40	4–40
