= 1947 Ole Miss Rebels football team =

American college football season

1947 Ole Miss Rebels football

SEC champion Delta Bowl champion

Delta Bowl, W 13–9 vs. TCU
- Conference: Southeastern Conference

Ranking
- AP: No. 13
- Record: 9–2 (6–1 SEC)
- Head coach: Johnny Vaught (1st season)
- Captain: Charlie Conerly
- Home stadium: Hemingway Stadium

1947 Southeastern Conference football standings
	Conf.					Overall
Team	W		L		T	W		L		T
No. 13 Ole Miss $	6	–	1	–	0	9	–	2	–	0
No. 10 Georgia Tech	4	–	1	–	0	10	–	1	–	0
No. 6 Alabama	5	–	2	–	0	8	–	3	–	0
Mississippi State	2	–	2	–	0	7	–	3	–	0
Georgia	3	–	3	–	0	7	–	4	–	1
Vanderbilt	3	–	3	–	0	6	–	4	–	0
Tulane	2	–	3	–	2	2	–	5	–	2
LSU	2	–	3	–	1	5	–	3	–	1
Kentucky	2	–	3	–	0	8	–	3	–	0
Tennessee	2	–	3	–	0	5	–	5	–	0
Auburn	1	–	5	–	0	2	–	7	–	0
Florida	0	–	3	–	1	4	–	5	–	1
$ – Conference champion; Rankings from AP Poll

The 1947 Ole Miss Rebels football team was an American football team that represented the University of Mississippi as a member of the Southeastern Conference (SEC) during the 1947 college football season. In its first season under head coach Johnny Vaught, the team compiled a 9–2 record (6–1 against SEC opponents), won the SEC championship, was ranked No. 13 in the final AP Poll, and outscored opponents by a total of 269 to 110. The team was invited to the 1948 Delta Bowl where it defeated TCU, 13–9.

Ole Miss featured two All-Americans on its 1947 roster: quarterback and team captain Charlie Conerly and end Barney Poole. Conerly was a consensus first-team All-American, who also finished fourth in the 1947 voting for the Heisman Trophy. Poole received first-team honors from the United Press, American Football Coaches Association, Sporting News, Central Press Association, and Walter Camp Football Foundation.

In addition to Conerly and Poole, two other Ole Miss players received honors on the 1947 All-SEC football team. Tackle Dub Garrett received first-team honors from the AP and UP, and tackle Bill Erickson received second-team honors from the AP.

The team played its home games at Hemingway Stadium in Oxford, Mississippi.

== Schedule ==
Date	Opponent	Rank	Site	Result	Attendance	Source
September 20	Kentucky^{†}		Hemingway Stadium; Oxford, MS	W 14–7	18,000	
September 27	at Florida		Fairfield Stadium; Jacksonville, FL	W 14–6	17,000	
October 4	vs. South Carolina*		Crump Stadium; Memphis, TN	W 33–0	12,000	
October 11	at No. 10 Vanderbilt	No. 18	Dudley Field; Nashville, TN (rivalry)	L 6–10	22,000	
October 18	at Tulane		Tulane Stadium; New Orleans, LA (rivalry)	W 27–14	> 40,000	
October 25	vs. Arkansas*		Crump Stadium; Memphis, TN (rivalry)	L 14–19	28,000	
November 1	at No. 17 LSU		Tiger Stadium; Baton Rouge, LA (rivalry)	W 20–18	46,000	
November 8	vs. Tennessee		Crump Stadium; Memphis, TN (rivalry)	W 43–13	28,000	
November 15	Chattanooga*	No. 15	Hemingway Stadium; Oxford, MS	W 52–0		
November 29	at Mississippi State	No. 15	Scott Field; Starkville, MS (Egg Bowl)	W 33–14	27,000	
January 1	vs. TCU*	No. 13	Crump Stadium; Memphis, TN (Delta Bowl)	W 13–9	28,800	
*Non-conference game; ^{†}Homecoming; Rankings from AP Poll released prior to the game

== Rankings ==
Ranking movements Legend: ██ Increase in ranking ██ Decrease in ranking — = Not ranked т = Tied with team above or below
	Week									
Poll	1	2	3	4	5	6	7	8	9	Final
AP	18	—	—	—	—	15т	15	15	12	13

== Roster ==
1947 Ole Miss Rebels football team roster
Players
Coaches
Offense

Pos.	#	Name	Class
		Charlie Conerly (C)
E		Barney Poole
G		Phillip Poole	Jr

Defense

Pos.	#	Name	Class

Special teams

Pos.	#	Name	Class

Head coach

- Johnny Vaught

Coordinators/assistant coaches

- Buster Poole (Defensive line)

Legend

- (C) Team captain
- (S) Suspended
- (I) Ineligible
- Injured
- Redshirt

== Season summary ==
=== Chattanooga ===
- Barney Poole 13 Rec, 95 Yds, TD
