= 1947 Tennessee Volunteers football team =

American college football season

1947 Tennessee Volunteers football
- Conference: Southeastern Conference
- Record: 5–5 (2–3 SEC)
- Head coach: Robert Neyland (16th season)
- Offensive scheme: Single-wing
- Home stadium: Shields–Watkins Field

1947 Southeastern Conference football standings
	Conf.					Overall
Team	W		L		T	W		L		T
No. 13 Ole Miss $	6	–	1	–	0	9	–	2	–	0
No. 10 Georgia Tech	4	–	1	–	0	10	–	1	–	0
No. 6 Alabama	5	–	2	–	0	8	–	3	–	0
Mississippi State	2	–	2	–	0	7	–	3	–	0
Georgia	3	–	3	–	0	7	–	4	–	1
Vanderbilt	3	–	3	–	0	6	–	4	–	0
Tulane	2	–	3	–	2	2	–	5	–	2
LSU	2	–	3	–	1	5	–	3	–	1
Kentucky	2	–	3	–	0	8	–	3	–	0
Tennessee	2	–	3	–	0	5	–	5	–	0
Auburn	1	–	5	–	0	2	–	7	–	0
Florida	0	–	3	–	1	4	–	5	–	1
$ – Conference champion; Rankings from AP Poll

The 1947 Tennessee Volunteers (variously Tennessee, UT, or the Vols) represented the University of Tennessee in the 1947 college football season. Playing as a member of the Southeastern Conference (SEC), the team was led by head coach Robert Neyland, in his 16th year, and played their home games at Shields–Watkins Field in Knoxville, Tennessee. They finished the season with a record of five wins and five losses (5–5 overall, 2–3 in the SEC).

Tennessee was ranked at No. 46 (out of 500 college football teams) in the final Litkenhous Ratings for 1947.

== Schedule ==
Date	Opponent	Site	Result	Attendance	Source
September 27	at Georgia Tech	Grant Field; Atlanta, GA (rivalry)	L 0–27	40,000	
October 1	Duke*^{†}	Shields–Watkins Field; Knoxville, TN	L 7–19	40,000	
October 11	Chattanooga*	Shields–Watkins Field; Knoxville, TN	W 26–7	20,000	
October 18	at Alabama	Legion Field; Birmingham, AL (Third Saturday in October)	L 0–10	32,000	
October 25	Tennessee Tech*	Shields–Watkins Field; Knoxville, TN	W 49–0	12,000	
November 1	at North Carolina*	Kenan Memorial Stadium; Chapel Hill, NC	L 6–20	41,000	
November 8	vs. Ole Miss	Crump Stadium; Memphis, TN (rivalry)	L 13–43	28,000	
November 15	Boston College*	Shields–Watkins Field; Knoxville, TN	W 38–13	20,000	
November 22	at Kentucky	McLean Stadium; Lexington, KY (rivalry)	W 13–6	25,000	
November 29	Vanderbilt	Shields–Watkins Field; Knoxville, TN (rivalry)	W 12–7	40,000	
*Non-conference game; ^{†}Homecoming

== Team players drafted into the NFL ==
Player	Position	Round	Pick	NFL club
Jim Powell	End	30	285	Chicago Cardinals
