= 1947 Alabama Crimson Tide football team =

American college football season

1947 Alabama Crimson Tide football

Sugar Bowl, L 7–27 vs. Texas
- Conference: Southeastern Conference

Ranking
- AP: No. 6
- Record: 8–3 (5–2 SEC)
- Head coach: Harold Drew (1st season)
- Captain: John Wozniak
- Home stadium: Denny Stadium; Legion Field

1947 Southeastern Conference football standings
	Conf.					Overall
Team	W		L		T	W		L		T
No. 13 Ole Miss $	6	–	1	–	0	9	–	2	–	0
No. 10 Georgia Tech	4	–	1	–	0	10	–	1	–	0
No. 6 Alabama	5	–	2	–	0	8	–	3	–	0
Mississippi State	2	–	2	–	0	7	–	3	–	0
Georgia	3	–	3	–	0	7	–	4	–	1
Vanderbilt	3	–	3	–	0	6	–	4	–	0
Tulane	2	–	3	–	2	2	–	5	–	2
LSU	2	–	3	–	1	5	–	3	–	1
Kentucky	2	–	3	–	0	8	–	3	–	0
Tennessee	2	–	3	–	0	5	–	5	–	0
Auburn	1	–	5	–	0	2	–	7	–	0
Florida	0	–	3	–	1	4	–	5	–	1
$ – Conference champion; Rankings from AP Poll

The 1947 Alabama Crimson Tide football team (variously "Alabama", "UA" or "Bama") represented the University of Alabama in the 1947 college football season. It was the Crimson Tide's 53rd overall and 14th season as a member of the Southeastern Conference (SEC). The team was led by head coach Harold Drew, in his first year, and played their home games at Denny Stadium in Tuscaloosa and Legion Field in Birmingham, Alabama. They finished with a record of eight wins and three losses (8–3 overall, 5–2 in the SEC) and with a loss in the Sugar Bowl.

After the Crimson Tide opened the season with a victory over Mississippi Southern, Alabama lost consecutive. games against Tulane and Vanderbilt to open the season 1–2. However, the Crimson Tide rebounded to win their final seven games against Duquesne, Tennessee, Georgia, Kentucky, Georgia Tech, LSU and Miami. Alabama then lost to Texas in the Sugar Bowl to finish the season 8–3. The 1947 season marked the first for Harold Drew as head coach for the Crimson Tide. Drew was hired as the replacement for long-time head coach Frank Thomas after he resigned his post due to personal health conditions in January 1947.

To date, 1947 is the last season that the Crimson Tide did not play in-state archrival Auburn.

== Schedule ==
Date	Opponent	Rank	Site	Result	Attendance
September 20	Mississippi Southern*		Legion Field; Birmingham, AL	W 34–7	30,000
September 27	at Tulane		Tulane Stadium; New Orleans, LA	L 20–21	60,000
October 4	at Vanderbilt		Dudley Field; Nashville, TN	L 7–14	22,000
October 11	Duquesne*		Denny Stadium; Tuscaloosa, AL	W 26–0	25,000
October 18	Tennessee		Legion Field; Birmingham, AL (Third Saturday in October)	W 10–0	32,000
October 25	at Georgia		Sanford Stadium; Athens, GA (rivalry)	W 17–7	48,000
November 1	at No. 13 Kentucky	No. 18	McLean Stadium; Lexington, KY	W 13–0	24,000
November 15	No. 6 Georgia Tech	No. 14	Legion Field; Birmingham, AL (rivalry)	W 14–7	35,000
November 22	LSU^{†}	No. 8	Denny Stadium; Tuscaloosa, AL (rivalry)	W 41–12	25,000
November 29	at Miami (FL)*	No. 6	Burdine Stadium; Miami, FL	W 21–6	27,491
January 1, 1948	vs. No. 5 Texas*	No. 6	Tulane Stadium; New Orleans, LA (Sugar Bowl)	L 7–27	73,000
*Non-conference game; ^{†}Homecoming; Rankings from AP Poll released prior to the game

== Rankings ==
Ranking movements Legend: ██ Increase in ranking ██ Decrease in ranking — = Not ranked ( ) = First-place votes
	Week									
Poll	1	2	3	4	5	6	7	8	9	Final
AP	—	—	—	18	16	14	8	6	7	6 (1)

== Game summaries ==
=== Mississippi Southern ===
Team	1	2	3	4	Total
Mississippi Southern	0	0	7	0	7
• Alabama	6	7	7	14	34

- Date: September 20
- Location: Legion Field
  Birmingham, AL
- Game attendance: 30,000

To open the 1946 season, the Crimson Tide defeated the Mississippi Southern Golden Eagles at Legion Field 34–7 in what was the first all-time meeting between the schools. The Crimson Tide took a 6–0 lead in the first quarter when Harry Gilmer threw a 33-yard touchdown pass to Rebel Steiner. Norwood Hodges extended the Alabama lead to 13–0 at halftime with his eight-yard touchdown run in the second quarter. Early in the third quarter, Mississippi scored their only points of the game on a 66-yard Bubba Phillips touchdown run to cut the Crimson Tide lead to 13–7. Alabama responded with 21 unanswered points for the 34–7 victory. Touchdowns were scored on a four-yard Gilmer run in the third and on a two-yard Hodges and one-yard Ed Salem run in the fourth quarter.

=== Tulane ===
Team	1	2	3	4	Total
Alabama	0	6	14	0	20
• Tulane	0	14	7	0	21

- Date: September 27
- Location: Tulane Stadium
  New Orleans, LA
- Game attendance: 60,000

To open conference play, Alabama traveled to New Orleans and lost to the Tulane Green Wave 21–20. After a scoreless first quarter, the Crimson Tide took a 6–0 lead after Norwood Hodges scored on a one-yard touchdown run. However, the Green Wave responded on the kickoff that ensued when Ed Price returned it 101-yards for a 7–6 Tulane lead. A Bennie Ellender touchdown pass as the second quarter ended gave the Green Wave a 14–6 halftime lead. Ray Prats extended the Tulane lead to 21–6 early in the third quarter after he returned an interception 65-yards for a touchdown. The Crimson Tide responded with a pair of third-quarter touchdowns, but lost by a single point. Alabama touchdowns in the third were scored by Hodges on a two-yard run and by Billy Cadenhead on an eight-yard run.

=== Vanderbilt ===
Team	1	2	3	4	Total
Alabama	0	0	0	7	7
• Vanderbilt	7	0	0	7	14

- Date: October 4
- Location: Dudley Field
  Nashville, TN
- Game attendance: 22,000

Against Vanderbilt, Alabama lost 14–7 at Dudley Field in a game dominated by the Commodores' pass defense. Vanderbilt scored the only points of the first half when Jamie Wade threw a 61-yard touchdown pass to John North for a 7–0 lead. In the fourth quarter, Robert Berry scored for the Commodores on an 11-yard run after they intercepted a Harry Gilmer pass. A late 23-yard Gilmer touchdown pass to Carl Mims to make the final score 14–7 and breakup the Vanderbilt shutout attempt.

=== Duquesne ===
Team	1	2	3	4	Total
Duquesne	0	0	0	0	0
• Alabama	0	7	13	6	26

- Date: October 11
- Location: Denny Stadium
  Tuscaloosa, AL
- Game attendance: 25,000

In what was the first all-time game against Duquesne, the Dukes lost 26–0 in the first Denny Stadium game of the season. After a scoreless first quarter, the Crimson Tide took a 7–0 halftime lead after Billy Cadenhead scored on a six-yard run. The Alabama lead was extended further in the third quarter after a 58-yard Norman Mosley punt return and a one-yard Norwood Hodges touchdown run to make the score 20–0 as they entered the final period. In the fourth, Travis Hicks scored the final points of the game and made the final score 26–0.

=== Tennessee ===
Third Saturday in October

Team	1	2	3	4	Total
Tennessee	0	0	0	0	0
• Alabama	0	0	7	3	10

- Date: October 18
- Location: Legion Field
  Birmingham, AL
- Game attendance: 32,000

Against Tennessee, the Crimson Tide shutout Volunteers 10–0 before a sellout crowd at Legion Field. After a scoreless first half, a nine-yard Billy Cadenhead touchdown run in the third and a seven-yard Hugh Morrow field goal in the fourth provided for the 10–0 margin of victory.

=== Georgia ===
Team	1	2	3	4	Total
• Alabama	7	0	7	3	17
Georgia	0	7	0	0	7

- Date: October 25
- Location: Sanford Stadium
  Athens, GA
- Game attendance: 48,000

Against Georgia, the Crimson Tide defeated the Bulldogs 17–7 before 48,000 fans at Sanford Stadium. The Crimson Tide took an early 7–0 lead after Harry Gilmer returned a punt 80-yards for a touchdown. The Bulldogs responded in the second quarter with their only points on an 83-yard John Rauch touchdown pass to Eli Maricich to tie the game 7–7 at halftime. Alabama retook the lead in the third on an 84-yard run that saw Lowell Tew run 44-yards before he tossed a lateral pass to Billy Cadenhead who took it the final 40-yards for the touchdown. A seven-yard Hugh Morrow field goal in the fourth made the final score 17–7.

=== Kentucky ===
Team	1	2	3	4	Total
#13 Kentucky	0	0	0	0	0
• #18 Alabama	6	7	0	0	13

- Date: November 1
- Location: McLean Stadium
  Lexington, KY
- Game attendance: 24,000

In Lexington, the Crimson Tide defeated the Wildcats 13–0 at McLean Stadium who were led by former Crimson Tide player Bear Bryant. Alabama scored all of their points on a pair of touchdowns in the first half. The first came on a three-yard Harry Gilmer run in the first quarter and the second on a two-yard Billy Cadenhead run in the second quarter.

=== Georgia Tech ===
Team	1	2	3	4	Total
#6 Georgia Tech	0	0	0	7	7
• #14 Alabama	7	7	0	0	14

- Date: November 15
- Location: Legion Field
  Birmingham, AL
- Game attendance: 35,000

Against the Yellow Jackets, the Crimson Tide had their second consecutive upset victory with their 14–7 at Legion Field. Alabama took a 14–0 lead into the fourth quarter after a five-yard Harry Gilmer touchdown pass to Rebel Steiner in the first quarter and on a one-yard Gilmer run in the second quarter. Tech scored their only points late in the fourth quarter on a four-yard Robert McCoy touchdown run to make the final score 14–7.

=== LSU ===
Team	1	2	3	4	Total
LSU	0	0	6	6	12
• #8 Alabama	21	7	7	6	41

- Date: November 22
- Location: Denny Stadium
  Tuscaloosa, AL
- Game attendance: 25,000

On homecoming in Tuscaloosa, Alabama defeated LSU 41–12 to close out conference play for the season. Immediately following the win, the Crimson Tide accepted an invitation to play in the 1948 Sugar Bowl.

=== Miami (FL) ===
Team	1	2	3	4	Total
• #6 Alabama	0	7	14	0	21
Miami	6	0	0	0	6

- Date: November 29
- Location: Burdine Stadium
  Miami, FL
- Game attendance: 27,491

This game against the Miami Hurricanes was originally scheduled to be played on Friday, November 28. However, severe weather and poor field conditions postponed its being played until the following evening, and in what was their final regular season game, Alabama defeated Miami 21–6 at Burdine Stadium. Miami took a 6–0 lead in the first quarter after Harold Schuler threw a 33-yard touchdown pass to Ed Houck. The Crimson Tide then responded with 21 unanswered points to win the game 21–6. Touchdowns were scored on a three-yard Harry Gilmer pass to Rebel Steiner in the second quarter and on runs by Gilmer and Jim Cain in the third quarter.

=== Texas ===
Sugar Bowl

Team	1	2	3	4	Total
#6 Alabama	0	7	0	0	7
• #5 Texas	7	0	7	13	27

- Date: January 1
- Location: Tulane Stadium
  New Orleans, LA
- Game attendance: 73,000

Against the Texas Longhorns, the Crimson Tide were defeated 27–7 in the 1948 Sugar Bowl.

== Personnel ==
=== Varsity letter winners ===
Player	Hometown	Position
Johnny August	Shadyside, Ohio	Halfback
Billy Cadenhead	Greenville, Mississippi	Halfback
Jim Cain	Eudora, Arkansas	End
Gri Cashio	Gadsden, Alabama	Guard
Francis Cassidy	Neff, Ohio	Tackle
Herb Chapman	Elmore, Alabama	Center
Bob Cochran	Hueytown, Alabama	Halfback
Charles Compton	Sylacauga, Alabama	Tackle
Bruno Filippini	Powhatan Point, Ohio	Guard
Dick Flowers	Mobile, Alabama	Tackle
Jim Franko	Yorkville, Ohio	Guard
Harry Gilmer	Birmingham, Alabama	Halfback
Clem Gryska	Steubenville, Ohio	Halfback
Norwood Hodges	Hueytown, Alabama	Fullback
Bob Hood	Gadsden, Alabama	Tackle
Vaughn Mancha	Birmingham, Alabama	Center
Hugh Morrow	Birmingham, Alabama	Quarterback
Norman Mosley	Blytheville, Arkansas	Halfback
Lionel W. Noonan	Mobile, Alabama	Halfback
Pat O'Sullivan	New Orleans, Louisiana	Linebacker
T. Ray Richeson	Russellville, Alabama	Tackle
Ed Salem	Birmingham, Alabama	Halfback
Rebel Steiner	Birmingham, Alabama	End
Lowell Tew	Waynesboro, Mississippi	Fullback
Ed White	Anniston, Alabama	End
Tom Whitley	Birmingham, Alabama	Tackle
John Wozniak	Fairhope, Pennsylvania	Guard

=== Coaching staff ===
Name	Position	Seasons at Alabama	Alma mater
Harold Drew	Head coach	14	Bates (1916)
Lew Bostick	Assistant coach	4	Alabama (1939)
Tilden Campbell	Assistant coach	8	Alabama (1935)
Joe Kilgrow	Assistant coach	4	Alabama (1937)
Malcolm Laney	Assistant coach	4	Alabama (1932)
Tom Lieb	Assistant coach	2	Notre Dame (1923)
