= Ken Holland (American football) =

American football quarterback

Playing career
- 1946–1947: Arkansas
- Position: Quarterback

Coaching career (HC unless noted)
- 1959–1960: Arkansas A&M

Head coaching record
- Overall: 5–12

Accomplishments and honors

Awards
- Second-team All-SWC (1946)

Kenneth Holland is an American former football player and coach. He was head coach at Arkansas Agricultural and Mechanical College—now known as the University of Arkansas–Monticello—from 1959 to 1960, compiling a record of 5–12. As a college football player, he was the starting quarterback for the University of Arkansas during the 1946 and 1947 seasons.

== Head coaching record ==
Year	Team	Overall	Conference	Standing	Bowl/playoffs
Arkansas A&M Boll Weevils (Arkansas Intercollegiate Conference) (1959–1960)
1959	Arkansas A&M	2–6	2–5	6th	
1960	Arkansas A&M	3–6	3–5	6th	
Arkansas A&M:		5–12	5–10		
Total:		5–12			
