= Lew Holder =

American football player (1923–2018)

Lewis Holder
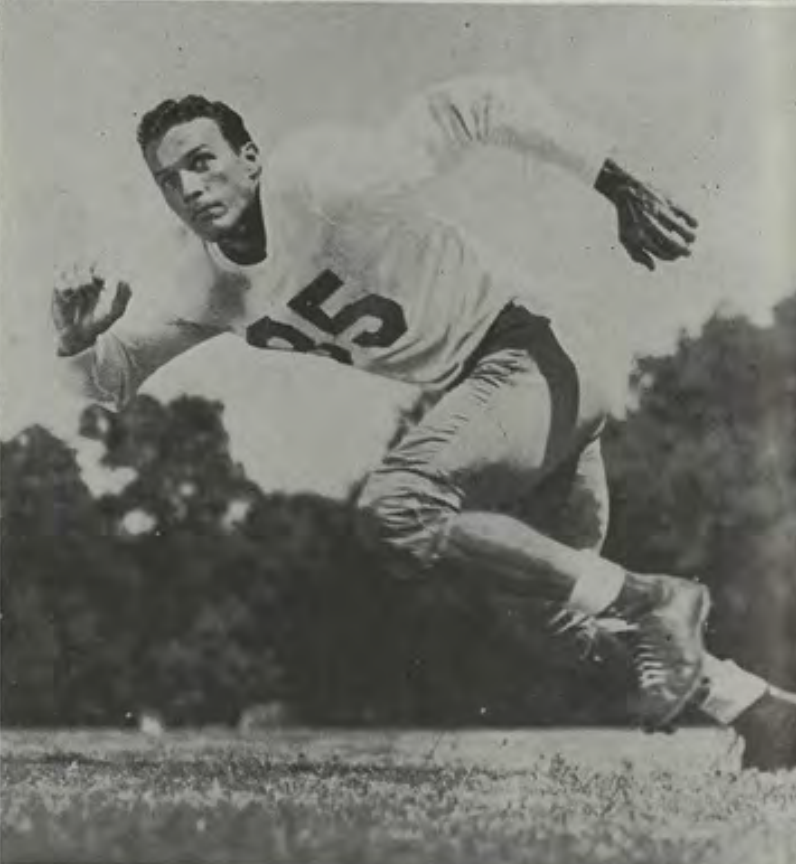
- Holder pictured c. 1948 at the University of Texas

No. 56
- Position: End

Personal information
- Born: October 10, 1923; Dallas, Texas, U.S.
- Died: March 29, 2018 (aged 94)
- Listed height: 6 ft 0 in (1.83 m)
- Listed weight: 191 lb (87 kg)

Career information
- High school: Woodrow Wilson (Dallas)
- College: Texas

Career history
- Los Angeles Dons (1949)
- Stats at Pro Football Reference

Lewis C. Holder (October 10, 1923 – March 29, 2018) was an American football end who played one season with the Los Angeles Dons. He played college football at the University of Texas, having previously attended Woodrow Wilson High School in Dallas, Texas.
