= Illinois–Michigan football series =

Big Ten college football series

- Illinois Fighting Illini Michigan Wolverines
- First meeting: November 12, 1898; Michigan 12, Illinois 5
- Latest meeting: October 19, 2024; Illinois 21, Michigan 7
- Next meeting: 2027
- Stadiums: Memorial Stadium (Champaign, Illinois) Michigan Stadium (Ann Arbor, Michigan)

Statistics
- Total meetings: 98
- All-time series: Michigan leads, 72–24–2
- Largest victory: Michigan, 57–0 (1969)
- Longest win streak: Michigan, 16 (1967–82)
- Current win streak: Illinois, 1 (2024–present)

Locations of Illinois and Michigan

The Illinois–Michigan football series is an American college football series between the Illinois Fighting Illini and Michigan Wolverines. The series dates back to 1898 and features two long-time Big Ten members, with Illinois claiming five national championships, 15 Big Ten Conference titles, and 24 consensus All-Americans, and Michigan claiming 12 national championships, 45 Big Ten titles, and 85 consensus All-Americans. Michigan leads the series 72–24–2.

For Illinois, Michigan is its third-most played opponent, trailing only Northwestern (108 games) and Ohio State (101 games). For Michigan, Illinois is its fourth-most played opponent, behind Ohio State (111 games), Michigan State (107 games) and Minnesota (101 games).

== Series highlights ==
The series has included many notable games, including the following:

- 1898: Michigan won the first game 12–5 on a field described as "a veritable sea of mud."
- 1924–1925: The teams met in 1924 with neither having lost a game since 1922. Red Grange returned the opening kick-off 95 yards for a touchdown and scored four touchdowns in the first quarter. When Grange played Michigan again in 1925, the Wolverines stopped Grange and shut out the Illini.
- 1927: Illinois defeated Michigan 14–0 en route to its fourth national championship under coach Robert Zuppke.
- 1928: In a game rated as "the greatest upset in years in the Big Ten", a winless Michigan team beat undefeated Illinois 3–0, denying coach Zuppke his fifth national championship.
- 1932–1933: Harry Kipke's Michigan teams defeated Illinois 32–0 and 7–6 on their way to consecutive national championships.
- 1939: In a major upset, a winless Illinois squad beat undefeated #2 Michigan 16–7.
- 1944: With both teams ranked in the top 10 of the AP poll, Crisler's Wolverines won 28–14.
- 1946: Illinois upset #8 Michigan 13–9, and Illinois and Michigan were ranked #5 and #6 respectively in the final AP poll. The loss to Illinois in 1946 was Michigan's last until 1949, as the Wolverines put together a 25-game winning streak and consecutive undefeated seasons in 1947 and 1948.
- 1955: In perhaps the greatest upset in series history, unranked Illinois defeated a Michigan team that was ranked #1 in the UPI coaches poll 25–6.
- 1963: Illinois, led by Dick Butkus, came in undefeated and ranked #2. Michigan came in 2–3–1 and upset Illinois 14–8.
- 1983: Ending a 16-game losing streak against Michigan, quarterback Jack Trudeau led #8 Illinois past #9 Michigan 16–6.
- 1999: An unranked Illinois team led by quarterback Kurt Kittner upset #9 Michigan 35–29 despite 307 passing yards for Michigan quarterback Tom Brady.
- 2010: Michigan won 67–65 in three overtimes. The combined total of 132 points broke the Big Ten single-game scoring record. Led by Denard Robinson, Michigan also set a school record with 416 passing yards.
- 2022: Trailing 17–10 entering the fourth quarter, Michigan's all-time scoring leader, kicker Jake Moody, kicked three of his four field goals in the fourth quarter, including his first-ever game winner, with nine seconds remaining, to send the Wolverines to a 19–17 victory.

== Accomplishments by the two teams ==
Team	Michigan	Illinois
National titles	12	5
CFP appearances	3	0
Bowl appearances	52	20
Postseason bowl record	23–29	8–12
Rose Bowl appearances	21	5
Rose Bowl wins	9	3
Big Ten divisional titles	4	0
Big Ten titles	45	15
Consensus All-Americans	88	27
Heisman Trophies	3	0
All-time program record	1004–353–36	632–625–50
All-time win percentage	.734	.503

== Game results ==
Rankings are from the AP Poll.

Illinois victories	Michigan victories	Tie games

No.	Date	Location	Winner	Score
1	November 12, 1898	Detroit, MI	Michigan	12–5
2	October 28, 1899	Champaign, IL	Michigan	5–0
3	October 27, 1900	Chicago, IL	Michigan	12–0
4	November 4, 1905	Champaign, IL	Michigan	33–0
5	October 27, 1906	Ann Arbor, MI	Michigan	28–9
6	November 15, 1919	Champaign, IL	Illinois	29–7
7	October 23, 1920	Ann Arbor, MI	Illinois	7–6
8	October 29, 1921	Champaign, IL	Michigan	3–0
9	October 28, 1922	Ann Arbor, MI	Michigan	24–0
10	October 18, 1924	Champaign, IL	Illinois	39–14
11	October 24, 1925	Champaign, IL	Michigan	3–0
12	October 23, 1926	Ann Arbor, MI	Michigan	13–0
13	October 29, 1927	Champaign, IL	Illinois	14–0
14	November 3, 1928	Ann Arbor, MI	Michigan	3–0
15	October 26, 1929	Champaign, IL	Illinois	14–0
16	October 25, 1930	Ann Arbor, MI	Michigan	15–7
17	October 24, 1931	Champaign, IL	Michigan	35–0
18	October 22, 1932	Ann Arbor, MI	Michigan	32–0
19	November 4, 1933	Champaign, IL	Michigan	7–6
20	October 27, 1934	Ann Arbor, MI	Illinois	7–6
21	November 9, 1935	Champaign, IL	Illinois	3–0
22	October 31, 1936	Ann Arbor, MI	Illinois	9–6
23	October 30, 1937	Champaign, IL	Michigan	7–6
24	October 29, 1938	Ann Arbor, MI	No. 13 Michigan	14–0
25	November 4, 1939	Champaign, IL	Illinois	16–7
26	October 19, 1940	Ann Arbor, MI	Michigan	28–0
27	November 1, 1941	Champaign, IL	No. 7 Michigan	20–0
28	October 31, 1942	Ann Arbor, MI	No. 13 Michigan	28–14
29	October 30, 1943	Champaign, IL	No. 6 Michigan	42–6
30	November 11, 1944	Ann Arbor, MI	No. 8 Michigan	14–0
31	October 27, 1945	Champaign, IL	No. 16 Michigan	19–0
32	October 26, 1946	Ann Arbor, MI	Illinois	13–9
33	November 1, 1947	Champaign, IL	No. 2 Michigan	14–7
34	October 30, 1948	Ann Arbor, MI	No. 1 Michigan	28–20
35	October 29, 1949	Champaign, IL	No. 6 Michigan	13–0
36	November 4, 1950	Ann Arbor, MI	No. 10 Illinois	7–0
37	November 3, 1951	Champaign, IL	No. 3 Illinois	7–0
38	November 1, 1952	Ann Arbor, MI	Illinois	22–13
39	November 7, 1953	Champaign, IL	No. 4 Illinois	19–3
40	November 6, 1954	Ann Arbor, MI	Michigan	14–7
41	November 5, 1955	Champaign, IL	Illinois	25–6
42	November 10, 1956	Ann Arbor, MI	No. 10 Michigan	17–7
43	November 9, 1957	Champaign, IL	Illinois	20–19
44	November 8, 1958	Ann Arbor, MI	Illinois	21–8
45	November 7, 1959	Champaign, IL	Michigan	20–15
46	November 5, 1960	Ann Arbor, MI	Michigan	8–7
47	November 11, 1961	Champaign, IL	Michigan	38–6
48	November 10, 1962	Ann Arbor, MI	Michigan	14–10
49	November 9, 1963	Champaign, IL	Michigan	14–8
50	November 7, 1964	Ann Arbor, MI	Michigan	21–6

No.	Date	Location	Winner	Score
51	November 6, 1965	Champaign, IL	Michigan	23–3
52	November 5, 1966	Ann Arbor, MI	Illinois	28–21
53	November 11, 1967	Champaign, IL	Michigan	21–14
54	November 9, 1968	Ann Arbor, MI	No. 7 Michigan	36–0
55	November 8, 1969	Champaign, IL	No. 18 Michigan	57–0
56	November 7, 1970	Ann Arbor, MI	No. 5 Michigan	42–0
57	October 16, 1971	Ann Arbor, MI	No. 3 Michigan	35–6
58	October 21, 1972	Champaign, IL	No. 6 Michigan	31–7
59	November 10, 1973	Ann Arbor, MI	No. 4 Michigan	21–6
60	November 9, 1974	Champaign, IL	No. 4 Michigan	14–6
61	November 15, 1975	Champaign, IL	No. 4 Michigan	21–15
62	November 13, 1976	Ann Arbor, MI	No. 4 Michigan	38–7
63	September 10, 1977	Champaign, IL	No. 2 Michigan	37–9
64	September 16, 1978	Ann Arbor, MI	No. 4 Michigan	31–0
65	October 20, 1979	Champaign, IL	No. 11 Michigan	27–7
66	October 25, 1980	Ann Arbor, MI	Michigan	45–14
67	November 7, 1981	Ann Arbor, MI	No. 12 Michigan	70–21
68	November 6, 1982	Champaign, IL	No. 15 Michigan	16–10
69	October 29, 1983	Champaign, IL	No. 9 Illinois	16–6
70	October 27, 1984	Ann Arbor, MI	Michigan	26–18
71	November 2, 1985	Champaign, IL	Tie	3–3
72	November 1, 1986	Ann Arbor, MI	No. 3 Michigan	69–13
73	November 14, 1987	Champaign, IL	Michigan	17–14
74	November 12, 1988	Ann Arbor, MI	No. 13 Michigan	38–9
75	November 11, 1989	Champaign, IL	No. 3 Michigan	24–10
76	November 10, 1990	Ann Arbor, MI	No. 19 Michigan	22–17
77	November 16, 1991	Champaign, IL	No. 4 Michigan	20–0
78	November 14, 1992	Ann Arbor, MI	Tie	22–22
79	October 23, 1993	Ann Arbor, MI	Illinois	24–21
80	October 22, 1994	Champaign, IL	No. 11 Michigan	19–14
81	September 2, 1995	Champaign, IL	No. 13 Michigan	38–14
82	August 31, 1996	Ann Arbor, MI	No. 12 Michigan	20–8
83	October 23, 1999	Ann Arbor, MI	Illinois	35–29
84	September 23, 2000	Champaign, IL	No. 10 Michigan	35–31
85	September 29, 2001	Ann Arbor, MI	No. 17 Michigan	45–20
86	September 28, 2002	Champaign, IL	No. 14 Michigan	45–28
87	October 18, 2003	Ann Arbor, MI	No. 17 Michigan	56–14
88	October 16, 2004	Champaign, IL	No. 14 Michigan	30–19
89	October 20, 2007	Champaign, IL	No. 24 Michigan	27–17
90	October 4, 2008	Ann Arbor, MI	Illinois	45–20
91	October 31, 2009	Champaign, IL	Illinois	38–13
92	November 6, 2010	Ann Arbor, MI	Michigan	67–65^{3OT}
93	November 12, 2011	Champaign, IL	No. 22 Michigan	31–14
94	October 13, 2012	Ann Arbor, MI	No. 25 Michigan	45–0
95	October 22, 2016	Ann Arbor, MI	No. 3 Michigan	41–8
96	October 12, 2019	Champaign, IL	No. 16 Michigan	42–25
97	November 19, 2022	Ann Arbor, MI	No. 3 Michigan	19–17
98	October 19, 2024	Champaign, IL	No. 22 Illinois	21–7
Series: Michigan leads 72–24–2

== Early games (1898–1906) ==
=== 1898: First meeting ===
1898: Illinois vs. Michigan

Team	1	2	Total
Illinois	5	0	5
• Michigan	6	6	12

- Date: November 12, 1898
- Location: Detroit Athletic Club Grounds, Detroit, Michigan
- Game start: 3:00 p.m.
- Game attendance: 3,500

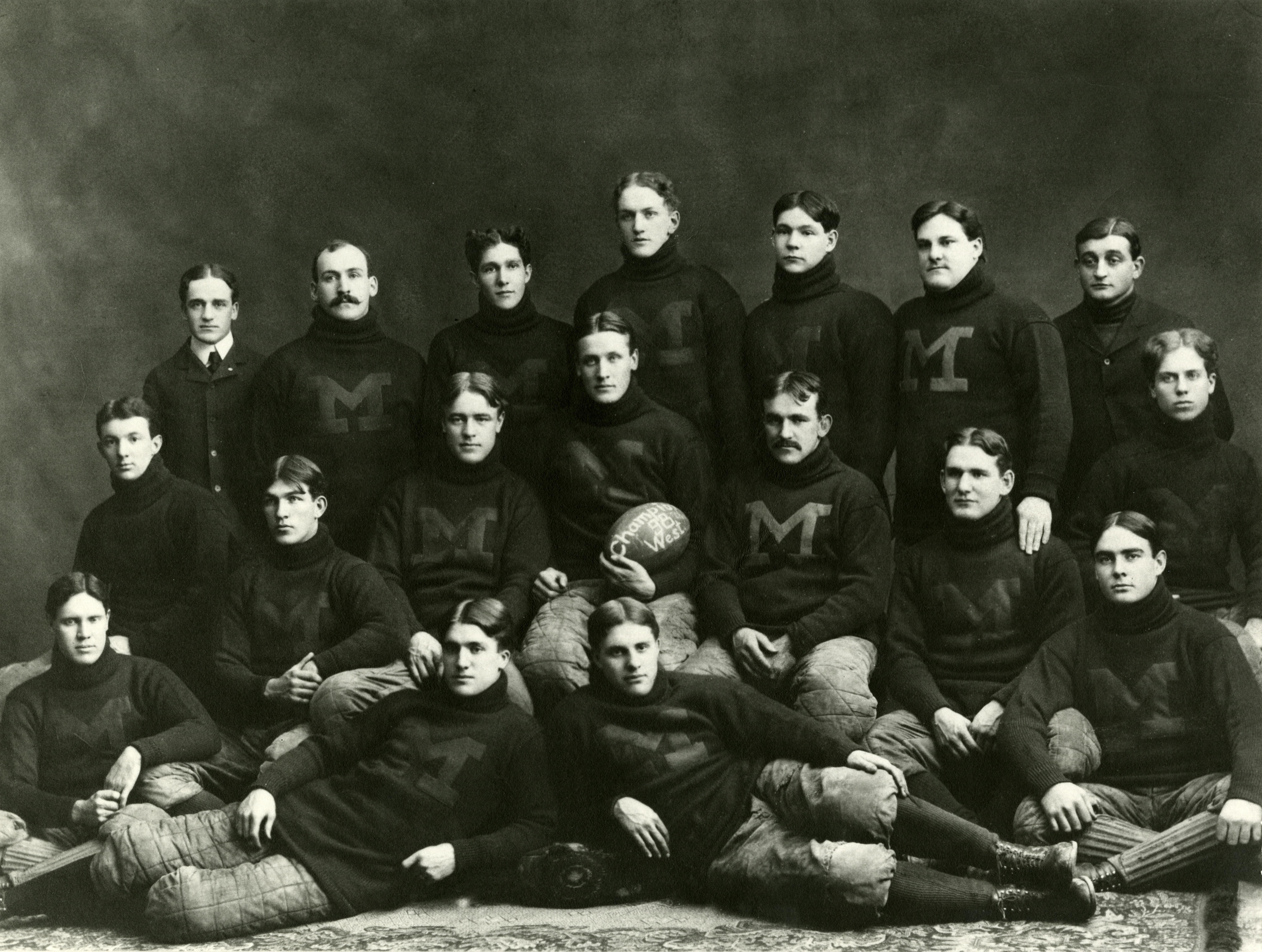
1898 Michigan team

Illinois and Michigan met for the first time on November 12, 1898. Michigan won, 12–5, in a game that was played before a crowd of 3,500 spectators at the Detroit Athletic Club grounds. Heavy rains earlier in the day had turned the field into "a veritable sea of mud." After five minutes of play, "the men were plastered with mud," and the wet field contributed to poor footing and difficulties handling the ball. The Wolverines won despite what one writer described as "ragged play" that included a number of penalties for offsides and "keeping of hands." Clifford Barabee scored Michigan's first touchdown as he was shoved across the goal line by his teammates. Illinois' only score came in the first half after Michigan's fullback, Alanson Weeks, fumbled, and an Illinois player picked it up and ran 50 yards for a touchdown.

=== 1906: Michigan's final conference game for 12 years ===
1906: Illinois at Michigan

Team	1	2	Total
Illinois	5	4	9
• Michigan	11	17	28

- Date: October 27, 1906
- Location: Ferry Field • Ann Arbor, MI
- Game attendance: 5,000

On October 27, 1906, Fielding H. Yost's Michigan Wolverines defeated Illinois, 28–9, before a crowd estimated at close to 5,000 persons at Ferry Field in Ann Arbor. The 1906 game was played on a soggy field resulting from "a constant rain of fourteen hours." The rain continued throughout the game, resulting in a slippery ball and numerous fumbles. Illinois turned the ball over four times on fumbles, and Michigan did so three times. On the first play of the game, John Garrels ran 90 yards for a touchdown. Pinckney ran for the Illinois touchdown — the first allowed by Michigan since 1904. Joe Curtis scored 18 points on three touchdowns and three extra points.

The Illinois game was Michigan's only contest in 1906 with a member of the Big Nine Conference. Michigan was engaged in a dispute with other conference schools and left the conference, resulting in a hiatus that lasted for the next 13 years.

== Series resumed (1919–24) ==
=== 1919–1920: Illinois records its first wins ===
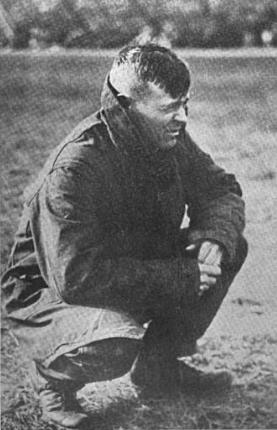
Robert Zuppke in 1920

Michigan returned to the Big Ten Conference in 1918. By that time, Robert Zuppke had taken over as head coach at Illinois and turned the team into a national power. On November 15, 1919, in the first meeting between coaches Zuppke and Yost, the Illini won, 29–7, the first victory by an Illinois team against Michigan. The game attracted 14,000 spectators, the second largest crowd in Illinois Field history to that point.

The Illini won again in 1920, 7–6. Quarterback John Dunn of Michigan scored on a 75-yard interception return but then missed the extra point. Illinois then took the lead on a pass from Walquist to Ralph Fletcher; Fletcher converted his point after touchdown to give Illinois its second straight victory over Michigan.

=== 1921: Michigan's first victory over Illinois since 1906 ===
1921: Michigan at Illinois

Team	1	2	3	4	Total
• Michigan	0	3	0	0	3
Illinois	0	0	0	0	0

- Date: October 29, 1921
- Location: Illinois Field
  Champaign, IL

On October 29, 1921, Michigan defeated Illinois, 3–0. A special train with 11 Pullmans left Ann Arbor on Friday evening with 600 students and the varsity band. Upon arriving in Champaign on Saturday morning, the Michigan contingent walked to the Inman Hotel where the Michigan team was quartered. Michigan students raided the hotel dining room and woke the guests with a variety of cheers and songs, including "Varsity" and "Samuel Hall".

The game was played on a field that was "soaked from torrents of rain that fell all of the night before," with players skidding around the field and vision "obscured by clotted mud." Michigan's scoring drive was led by the rushing of Franklin Cappon and Doug Roby and ended with a field goal kicked by Frank Steketee. Michigan's victory over Illinois in 1921 was the start of a 20-game undefeated streak by Michigan that lasted until October 18, 1924, when it lost to an Illinois squad led by Red Grange.

After the game, the Michigan varsity band put their caps on backwards and led the Michigan students in a snake-dance through the streets of Champaign. On arriving at the Inman Hotel, varsity cheerleader Al Cuthbert climbed atop the hotel's glass awning to lead the Michigan contingent in cheers, breaking the awning in the process.

=== 1922: Undefeated Wolverines shut out the Illini ===
1922: Illinois at Michigan

Team	1	2	3	4	Total
Illinois	0	0	0	0	0
• Michigan	0	10	14	0	24

- Date: October 28, 1922
- Location: Ferry Field
  Ann Arbor, MI
- Game attendance: 41,000

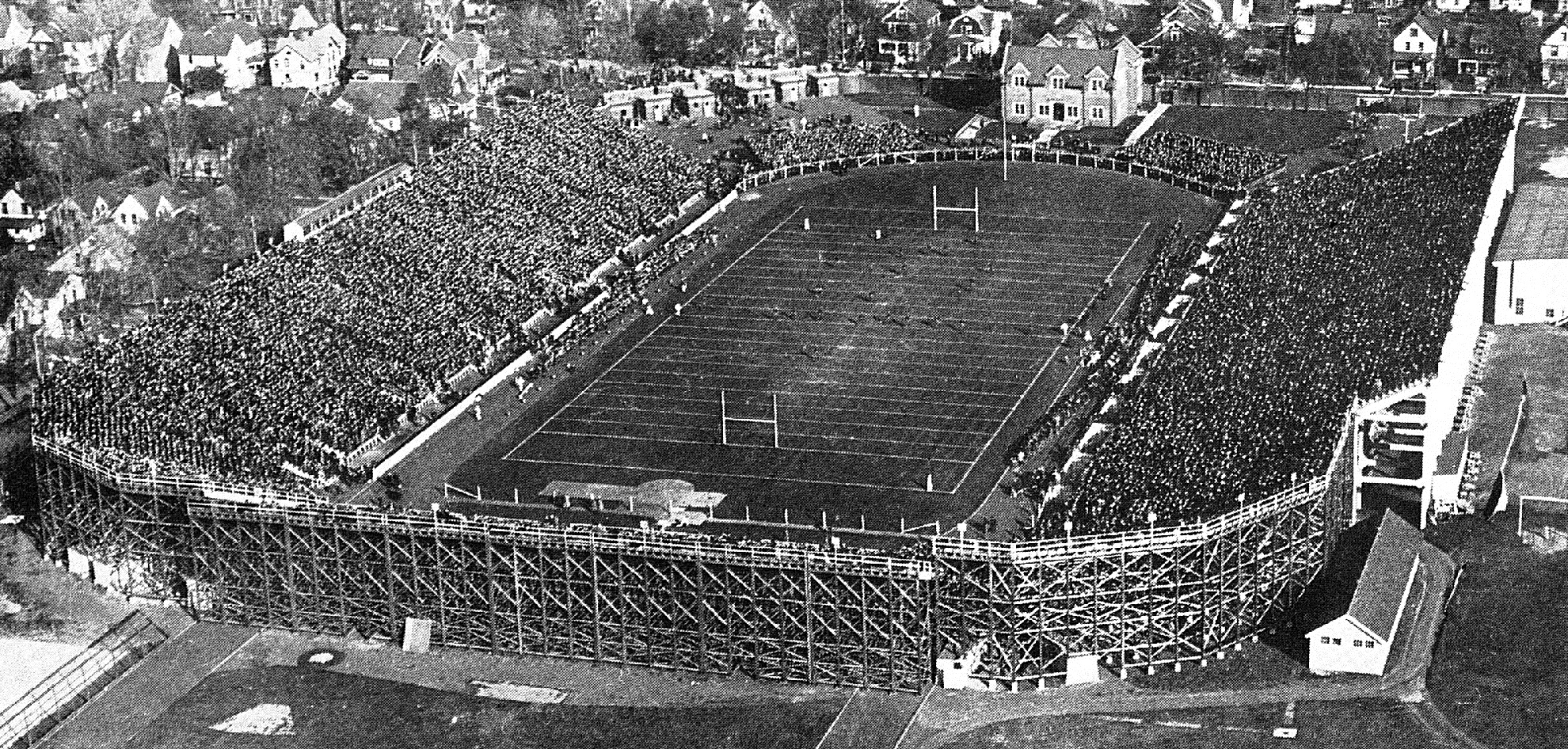
Aerial view of Ferry Field prior to the opening kick-off against Illinois in 1922

On October 28, 1922, Michigan defeated Illinois, 24–0. After being held scoreless in the first quarter, Michigan scored 24 points in the second and third quarters. One of the featured plays was Bernard Kirk's return of the opening kickoff of the second half for a touchdown. One sports writer opined that Kirk's 80-yard return "will take rank with the most brilliant football achievements of any of Michigan's illustrious sons of the gridiron."

== The Grange years (1924–1925) ==
=== 1924: One of the greatest performances ever on an American gridiron ===
1924: Michigan at Illinois

Team	1	2	3	4	Total
Michigan	0	7	0	7	14
• Illinois	27	0	6	6	39

- Date: October 18, 1924
- Location: Memorial Stadium • Champaign, IL
- Game attendance: 67,000

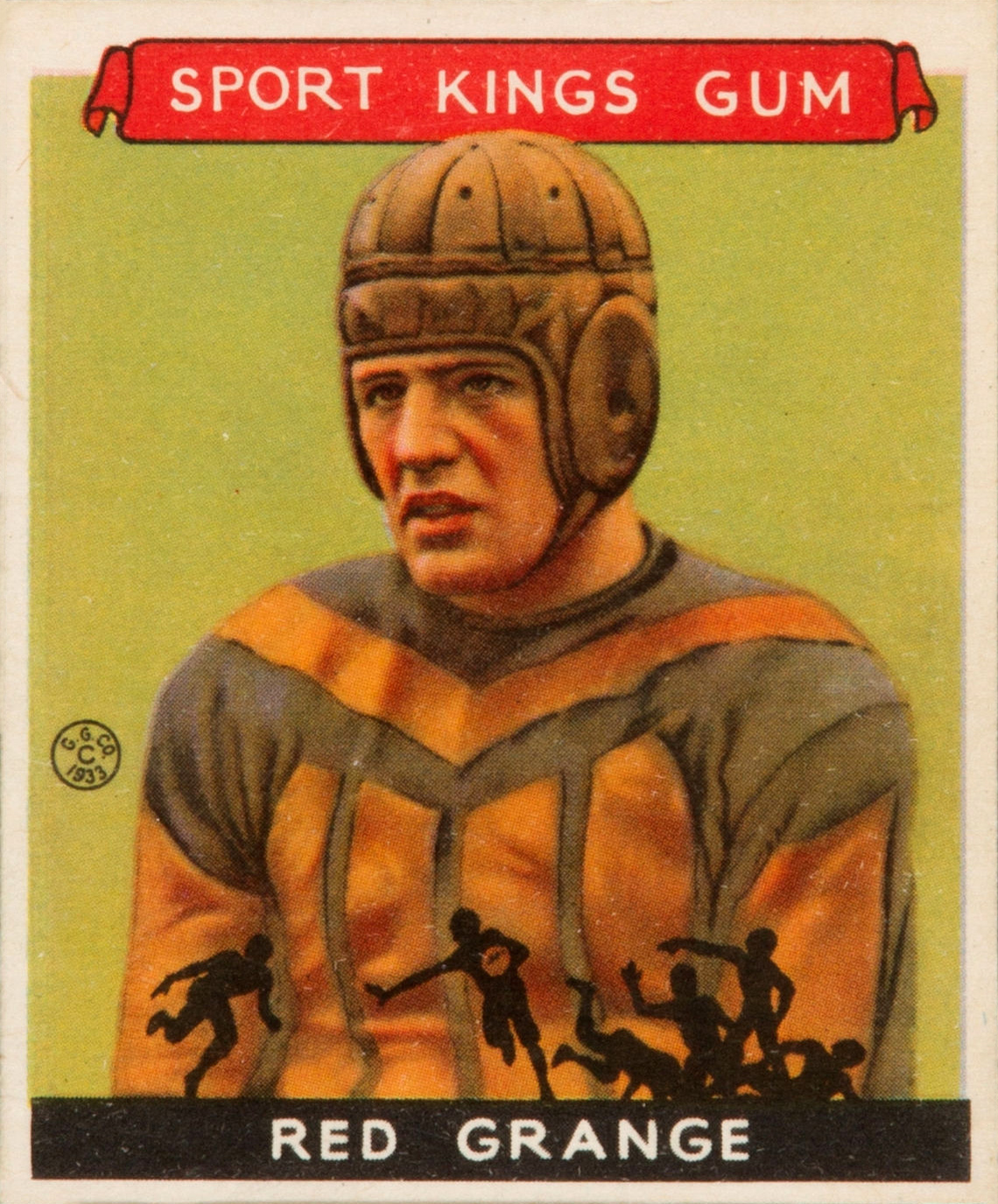
Red Grange

During the 1923 season, Illinois and Michigan did not meet. Both had undefeated seasons, with each team receiving national championship honors from some selectors. On October 18, 1924, both teams were again undefeated when they met in Champaign. Illinois won, 39–14. Red Grange gained national notoriety for his performance, returning the opening kick-off 95 yards for a touchdown, scoring five touchdowns in the first quarter (five in all), and accumulating 402 yards on offense. The New York Times reported: "Unbiased experts agree that his performance was among the greatest ever seen on an American gridiron."

=== 1925: Michigan stops Grange ===
1925: Michigan at Illinois

Team	1	2	3	4	Total
• Michigan	0	3	0	0	3
Illinois	0	0	0	0	0

- Date: October 24, 1925
- Location: Memorial Stadium • Champaign, IL
- Game attendance: 67,000

On October 24, 1925, Michigan defeated Illinois, 3–0, in Champaign. The victory came as Illinois celebrated homecoming in front of a record crowd of 67,000 at Memorial Stadium. Stopping Red Grange was considered to be the key to beating Illinois in 1925. During the pre-season practice sessions, Michigan's line coach Tad Wieman dressed a player in a sweater with Grange's number and sent his guards and tackles "after the mythical Grange with instructions to 'hit him hard.'" Before the game, Michigan coach Fielding H. Yost told reporters: "One of the greatest throngs in all football history is here. For weeks the game has been on every tongue. . . . Our players have been compared as to weight, speed, and ability. The stage is set."

The only points of the game were scored in the second quarter on Benny Friedman's field goal from the 25-yard line. The field goal was set up by Bennie Oosterbaan's interception and a long gain on a triple pass from Friedman to George Babcock who then handed the ball to Bruce Gregory. Earl Britton of Illinois attempted two field goals, but both missed the mark. The game was played on a rainsoaked field which was credited with handicapping Grange.

Michigan fullback Bo Molenda was also credited with stopping Grange. Grange played at quarterback for the first time in his career and was held to 56 net rushing yards on 25 carries. The Associated Press wrote of Molenda's efforts: "Molenda was the principal reason why the Illini's aerial attack was unsuccessful. Time after time he got in the way to make the pass incomplete or to gather it in his arms." Molenda intercepted a pass thrown by Grange on the opening drive of the game and made a second interception of a pass thrown by Earl Britton later in the first quarter. He had two more interceptions in the fourth quarter, both on passes thrown by Daugherty. Multiple sources indicate that Molenda intercepted a total of five passes in the game.

In an increasingly rare display of ironman football, the same 22 players who started the game for Michigan and Illinois also finished the game. The Associated Press noted: "The fact that the same men finished the game is causing wide comment, for such a happening has not occurred in Big Ten contests for a great many years. This seems to be the age of wholesale substitutions, and to have two elevens go through an important and hard contest without rushing in new men every few minutes is to upset modern football precedent."

== Later Zuppke era (1926–1941) ==
=== 1926: Conference champion Michigan shuts out Illinois ===
On October 23, 1926, Michigan defeated Illinois, 13–0. Benny Friedman kicked a field goal to give Michigan a 3–0 lead at halftime. After a scoreless third quarter, Michigan scored 10 points in the fourth quarter. Michigan's lone touchdown was scored by Bo Molenda, and Friedman later kicked his second field goal. In their 25th year under head coach Fielding Yost, Michigan tied with Northwestern for the Big Ten championship.

=== 1927: National champion Illinois ===
1927: Michigan at Illinois

Team	1	2	3	4	Total
Michigan	0	0	0	0	0
• Illinois	7	0	7	0	14

- Date: October 29, 1927
- Location: Memorial Stadium
  Champaign, IL
- Game attendance: 62,000

On October 29, 1927, Michigan lost to Illinois, 14–0. Michigan played without its backfield star, Louis Gilbert, who was injured the prior week when he threw three touchdown passes against Ohio State. The first Illinois touchdown followed a fumble by Gilbert's replacement, William Puckelwartz, at Michigan's seven-yard line. Illinois' halfback Timm ran around the end for the touchdown. Illinois finished the season undefeated and has been recognized as a national champion.

=== 1928: Michigan spoils Illinois' undefeated season ===
On November 3, 1928, Illinois came into the Michigan game undefeated and expecting to win a fifth national championship under head coach Robert Zuppke. The game was played at Champaign in front of a stadium-record crowd of 85,000. Under first-year head coach Tad Wieman, Michigan came into the game winless with an 0–4 record. In a result that was rated as "the greatest upset in years in the Big Ten", Michigan won, 3–0, with the only points being scored on a field goal by Joe Gembis. The game was the only loss for an Illinois team that outscored its opponents 145 to 16, including five shut outs, and finished the season with a 7–1 record.

=== 1931: Worst defeat of the Zuppke era ===
1931: Michigan at Illinois

Team	1	2	3	4	Total
Michigan	0	0	0	0	0
Illinois	0	0	0	0	0

- Date: October 24, 1931
- Location: Memorial Stadium, Champaign, IL

On October 24, 1931, Michigan defeated Illinois, 35–0, the worst defeat suffered by a Zuppke-coached team at Illinois up to that time. The game also marked the beginning of a 22-game undefeated streak that lasted until the start of the 1934 season. Fullback Bill Hewitt averaged over six yards per carry on 24 carries and quarterback Harry Newman scored on a 45-yard interception return.

=== 1932: National champion Michigan shuts out Illini ===
1932: Illinois at Michigan

Team	1	2	3	4	Total
Illinois	0	0	0	0	0
• Michigan	13	7	12	0	32

- Date: October 22, 1932
- Location: Michigan Stadium
  Ann Arbor, MI
- Game attendance: 19,513

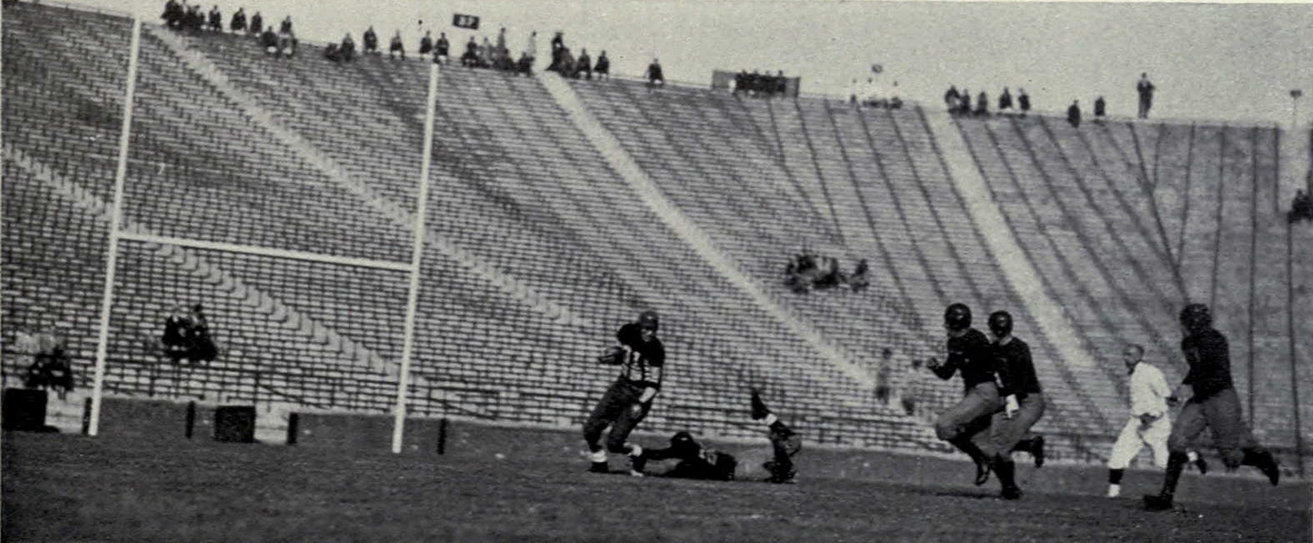
Sparse Depression era crowd at Michigan Stadium for Illinois game.

On October 22, 1932, Michigan defeated Illinois, 32–0. Michigan's first touchdown came on a 34-yard pass from Harry Newman to Ivy Williamson. The second touchdown came on a 56-yard run by Ted Petoskey. Herman Everhardus ran for the third touchdown in the second period, and Michigan led 20–0 at halftime. On the opening kickoff of the second half, Newman returned the ball 76 yards to the Illinois 19-yard line, and Petoskey ran for the touchdown. The final touchdown came on a pass from Newman to Williamson. Michigan gained 410 yards of total offense, 296 on the ground. Petoskey led the team with 187 rushing yards on 21 carries.

=== 1933: National champion Michigan edges Illinois ===
1933: Michigan at Illinois

Team	1	2	3	4	Total
• Michigan	0	7	0	0	7
Illinois	6	0	0	0	6

- Date: November 4, 1933
- Location: Memorial Stadium
  Champaign, IL
- Game attendance: 27,000

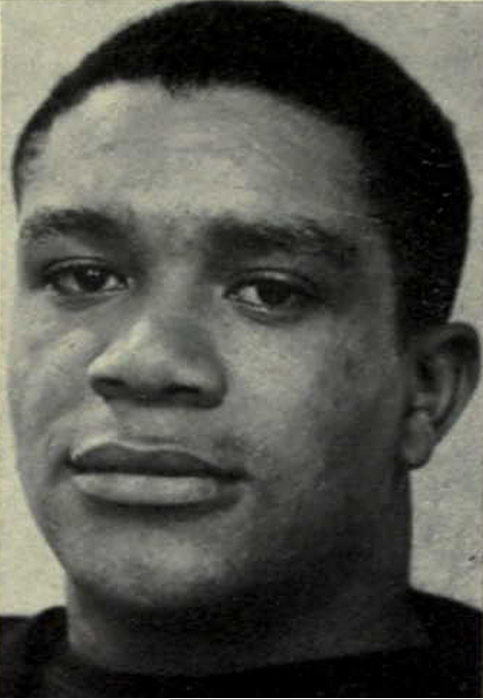
Willis Ward's block of Illinois' extra point preserved Michigan's winning streak.

On November 4, 1933, undefeated Michigan beat Illinois 7–6 en route to the team's second straight national title. Before the game, a member of the Michigan coaching staff expressed concern that Illinois head coach Robert Zuppke, with two weeks to prepare due to a bye week, would have a variety of tricks ready for Michigan.

Illinois scored first on a drive led by the passing of Illinois quarterback Jack Beynon. Fullback Cook scored from the three-yard line, but Barton Cummings' kick for the extra point was blocked by Michigan's right end Willis Ward. In the second quarter, a poor punt by Beynon gave Michigan possession at the Illinois 28-yard line. Herman Everhardus ran around right end for a touchdown and then kicked the extra point to give the Wolverines a 7–6 lead. With 15 seconds remaining in the game, John Regeczi punted from Michigan's end zone. Illinois quarterback Beynon made a fair catch at Michigan's 31-yard line. Illinois elected to attempt a field goal without interference, an option available to teams receiving a punt under 1933 rules. The crowd stood as Barton Cummings lined up to attempt the kick. The kick was a foot wide of the upright, and Michigan's 7–6 lead held. Illinois coach Zuppke was credited for his "magnificent" strategy in nearly upsetting a Michigan squad that had been hailed as the "perfect team".

=== 1934–1936: Illinois winning streak ===
From 1934 to 1936, Illinois put together its longest winning streak of three games against Michigan up to that point. The Illini later had a four-game winning streak against Michigan in the 1950s.

=== 1939: Unranked Illinois upsets #2 Michigan ===
Week 5: Michigan at Illinois

Team	1	2	3	4	Total
#2 Michigan	0	7	0	0	7
• Illinois	0	9	0	7	16

- Date: November 4, 1939
- Location: Memorial Stadium
  Champaign, IL
- Game attendance: 31,025

On November 4, 1939, Michigan lost to Illinois 16–7 in a major upset. Michigan had defeated Illinois in 1937 and 1938 and came into the game ranked #2 in the AP Poll, while unranked Illinois was 0–4 to that point in the season. The Chicago Tribune wrote of Illinois that "a football season that began dismally reached a hysterical climax." Michigan outgained Illinois 112 to 98 on the ground and 99 to 77 in the air. However, Michigan gave up eight turnovers on three interceptions and five fumbles, including three fumbles by Fred Trosko. Michigan's only points came on a 49-yard touchdown pass from Dave Strong to Tom Harmon with Strong running for the extra point after Harmon's kick was blocked.

=== 1941: Zuppke's farewell ===
Robert Zuppke was the head coach at Illinois from 1913 to 1941. He compiled a 9–13 record against Michigan. On November 1, 1941, in his final game against Michigan, Zuppke's Illini lost 20–0 to Fritz Crisler's Wolverines. Two weeks after the loss, and following further losses to Iowa and Ohio State, Zuppke announced on November 17, 1941, that he was retiring after 29 years of service.

== War and post-war years (1942–49) ==
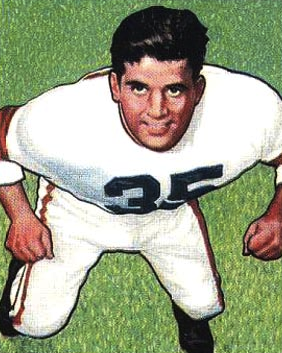
Illinois guard Alex Agase

During World War II and in the immediate post-war year, Illinois and Michigan were loaded with talent. Both teams were ranked in the AP poll when they met in 1942 and 1944, and in 1946, Illinois was ranked #5 in the final AP poll, while Michigan was ranked #6. Illinois guard Alex Agase won the Chicago Tribune Silver Football trophy as the Big Ten's Most Valuable Player in 1946, and Michigan's Bump Elliott won the award in 1947. In 1947 and 1948, Michigan was undefeated and won consecutive national titles, defeating Illinois in close games both years.

=== 1942: #13 Michigan overcomes #12 Illinois ===
1942: Illinois at Michigan

Team	1	2	3	4	Total
Illinois	0	7	0	7	14
• Michigan	7	7	7	7	28

- Date: October 31, 1942
- Location: Michigan Stadium
  Ann Arbor, MI
- Game attendance: 33,826

In Illinois' first season under head coach Ray Eliot, Michigan was ranked #13 and Illinois #12 in the AP poll when the teams met on October 31, 1942. The Wolverines beat the Illini 28–14 in front of 33,826 fans at Michigan Stadium. Michigan touchdowns were scored by Paul White, Bob Chappuis, Bob Wiese, and Bob Stenberg. Wiese's touchdown came on a 19-yard pass from Tom Kuzma.

=== 1944: #8 Michigan defeats #10 Illinois ===
On November 11, 1944, Illinois and Michigan came into the game with both teams ranked in the top 10 in the AP poll for the first time in series history. #8 Michigan beat #10 Illinois 14–0 at Michigan Stadium. Michigan's touchdowns were scored by Don Lund (four-yard run in the first quarter) and Jack Weisenburger (two-yard run in the fourth quarter after Harold Watts recovered a fumbled punt at the Illinois 31-yard line), and Joe Ponsetto kicked both points after touchdown. Michigan held Illinois' back Claude "Buddy" Young, the NCAA sprint champion, to 81 yards. Illinois threatened in the first quarter but fumbled at Michigan's one-yard line. Michigan gained 231 yards to 159 for Illinois, with Michigan's yardage divided among multiple backs, including Gene Derricotte (67 yards), Lund (56 yards), Ralph Chubb (53 yards), and Weisenburger (37 yards). Neither team completed a pass.

=== 1946: Illinois and Michigan ranked #5 and #6 ===
1946: Illinois at Michigan

Team	1	2	3	4	Total
• Illinois	0	7	6	0	13
Michigan	0	7	0	2	9

- Date: October 26, 1946
- Location: Michigan Stadium
  Ann Arbor, MI
- Game attendance: 86,938

On October 26, 1946, Illinois beat Michigan 13–9. Playing at Michigan Stadium before a crowd of 85,938, Bob Wiese ran for the game's first touchdown, and Jim Brieske kicked the point after touchdown. On the kickoff following Michigan's touchdown, Illinois drove 95 yards and scored on a 16-yard run by Paul Patterson. In the third quarter, Illinois end Sam Zatkoff intercepted a pass thrown by Bob Chappuis and ran 53 yards for a touchdown. Illinois' attempt at extra point was blocked by Quentin Sickels. In the fourth quarter, Michigan twice drove deep into Illinois territory (once to the 17-yard line and then to the eight-yard line), but Michigan's only points in the quarter were scored a safety as Bruce Hilkene blocked a punt into the end zone. Michigan out-gained Illinois in rushing yardage, 190 yards to 112, and in passing yardage, 142 yards to 39. However, Michigan fumbled the ball 12 times in the game.

The Illini went on to win the Big Ten Conference title and completed an 8–2 season with a 45–14 win over UCLA in the Rose Bowl. The 1946 Illinois game was Michigan's last loss until October 8, 1949, a span of nearly three years during which the Wolverines won 25 consecutive games.

=== 1947: Undefeated Michigan edges Illinois ===
1947: Michigan at Illinois

Team	1	2	3	4	Total
• Michigan	7	7	0	0	14
Illinois	0	7	0	0	7

- Date: November 1, 1947
- Location: Memorial Stadium
  Champaign, Illinois
- Game attendance: 71,119

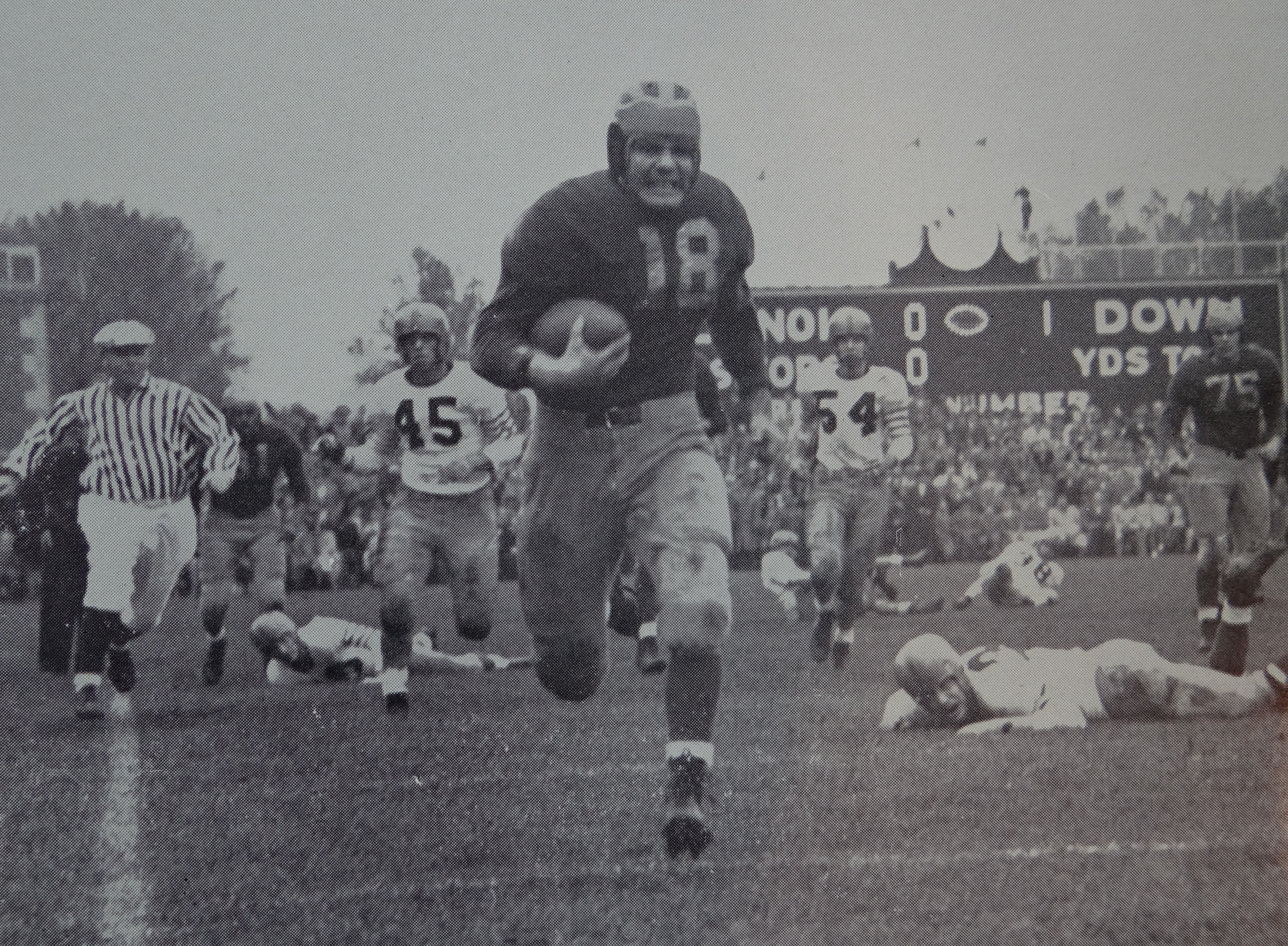
Bump Elliott runs 74 yards for a touchdown against Illinois.

On November 1, 1947, Michigan traveled to Champaign for Illinois' homecoming game. Michigan was ranked #2 in the AP poll before the game, and Illinois was ranked #11. Michigan won by a narrow margin, 14–7. Late in the first quarter, Michigan took a 7–0 lead on a 74-yard punt return by Bump Elliott. Russ Steger scored for Illinois, and Michigan's winning touchdown was set up by a 52-yard passing play from Bob Chappuis to Bump Elliott. In its tenth and final year under head coach Fritz Crisler, Michigan went on to compile a perfect 10–0 record, win the Big Ten Conference championship, and defeat the USC Trojans 49–0 in the 1948 Rose Bowl.

=== 1948: National champion Michigan edges Illinois ===
1948: Illinois at Michigan

Team	1	2	3	4	Total
Illinois (2–3)	0	7	6	7	20
• Michigan (5–0)	0	7	14	7	28

- Date: October 30, 1948
- Location: Michigan Stadium
  Ann Arbor, MI
- Game attendance: 85,938

On October 30, 1948, undefeated and #1-ranked Michigan defeated Illinois 28–20 for the team's 20th straight victory. Michigan's defense held on a goal-line stand in the first quarter (first-and-goal from the five-yard line), and Illinois failed to convert a field goal on fourth down. Michigan outgained Illinois on the ground 102 to 40, but Illinois dominated in the air with 256 passing yards to 132 for Michigan. The New York Times called the game, witnessed by a homecoming crowd of 85,938, "one of the wildest fights in Big Nine history" and added, "What a battle this was! Not for a second could one be sure of the outcome."

== Illini dominance in the 1950s ==
During the 1950s, the Illini, coached by Ray Eliot, won seven of ten games with the Wolverines, including a four-game winning streak from 1950 to 1953.

=== 1950: Illini defeats Big Ten champion Wolverines ===
On November 4, 1950, Illinois, ranked #10 in the AP poll, defeated Michigan 7–0. After the loss to Illinois, Michigan won three straight conference games, won the conference championship, and was ranked #9 in the final AP poll.

=== 1951: Undefeated #3 Illini beats Michigan ===
In 1951, Illinois was in its tenth season under head coach Ray Eliot. Illinois was ranked #3 in the AP poll before the game, and Michigan was ranked #15. The game was played before a capacity crowd of 71,119 in a blizzard at Champaign's Memorial Stadium with a 40-mile per hour gale in the fourth quarter. The game was a scoreless tie until late in the fourth quarter when the Illini drove 84 yards, capped by an eight-yard touchdown pass from quarterback Tommy O'Connell to Red Smith. The Illini defeated Michigan by a 7 to 0 score. The 1951 Illini ultimately compiled a 9–0–1 record, defeated Stanford 40–7 in the 1952 Rose Bowl, and were ranked #4 in the final AP poll.

=== 1952: Unranked Illinois defeats #15 Michigan ===
On November 1, 1952, Illinois, unranked in the AP poll, defeated #15 Michigan 22–13. In the first half, Illinois blocked two Michigan punts and took a 22–0 lead at halftime. Michigan scored 13 points in the second half, but the attempted comeback fell short.

=== 1953: #4 Illinois defeats #17 Michigan ===
On November 7, 1953, Illinois, ranked #7 in the AP poll, defeated #17 Michigan 19–3. Michigan took an early 3–0 lead in the first quarter, but was held scoreless for the rest of the game. Consensus All-American J. C. Caroline led the Illini attack.

=== 1955: Unranked Illinois upsets #1 Michigan ===
On November 5, 1955, Illinois recorded the biggest upset in the series history. Michigan came into the game with an undefeated record and ranked #1 in the UPI coaches poll, but lost to Illinois, 25–6. Bobby Mitchell led the Illini attack with 173 rushing yards on 10 carries, including gains of 75 and 55 yards. The Pantagraph wrote that Illinois outplayed Michigan in all respects and called it "one of the most cherished victories in Illinois football history."

=== 1957: Unranked Illinois upsets #9 Michigan ===
On November 9, 1957, unranked Illinois again upset a highly ranked (#9 in the UPI poll) Michigan team, 20–19. Michigan's star back, Jim Pace, who won the 1957 Chicago Tribune Silver Football trophy as the Big Ten MVP, was injured after a 48-yard gain early in the first half, carried off the field on a stretcher, and sidelined for the remainder of the game.

== Elliott vs. Elliott (1960–1966) ==
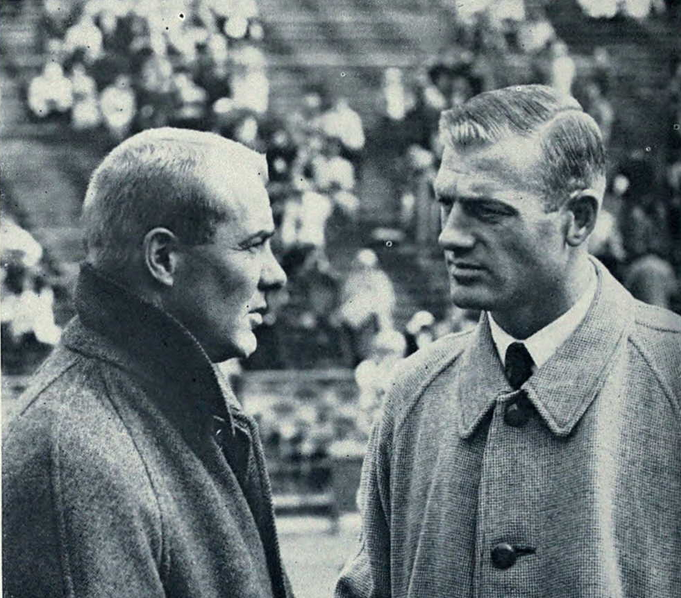
Brothers Pete Elliott and Bump Elliott greeting one another before the 1960 Michigan-Illinois football game

Bump Elliott and Pete Elliott were brothers who played football together at Michigan. They later served as assistant coaches together at Oregon State in 1949 and 1950. The Elliotts coached against each other from 1960 to 1966 while Bump was the head football coach at Michigan and Pete held the same position at Illinois. In November 1963, Pete Elliott's Illinois team, led by Dick Butkus, was ranked #2 in the country and was the favorite for the Rose Bowl when it played Michigan. Michigan was 2–3–1 when the brothers met in 1963, but Michigan came out on top 14–8, marking the fourth straight time that Bump's Wolverines defeated Pete's Illini. Michigan won the first six games during the "Elliott v. Elliott" years. Illinois won the 1966 game 28–21.

After the 1966 season, Pete Elliott resigned as Illinois' head football coach, having compiled a 31–34–1 record. Bump Elliott resigned as Michigan's head coach after the 1968 season, having compiled a 51–42–2 record.

== Michigan's 16-game winning streak (1967–82) ==
After their victory in 1966, Illinois lost a series-record 16 games to Michigan from 1967 to 1982. Bo Schembechler became Michigan's coach in 1969 and led the Wolverines to a 59–0 victory that year, the largest margin of victory for either team. Other blowouts for Michigan followed, including a 42–0 win in 1970 and a 70–21 win in 1981.

== 1980s and 1990s ==
=== 1981: Michigan tallies 70 points ===
In 1981, Michigan defeated Illinois by a 70–21 score. The Illini, led by Tony Eason, took a 21–7 lead in the first quarter, but Michigan dominated for the remainder of the game, scoring 63 unanswered points. Eason had not thrown an interception in 73 consecutive attempts prior to the game, but was picked off four times in the game. Michigan's total of 70 points remains the most scored by either team in the history of the series. Anthony Carter caught six passes for 154 yards and two touchdowns. Steve Smith rushed 15 times for 116 yards and also completed 9 of 15 passes for 224 yards.

=== 1983: Trudeau leads #8 Illini past #9 Wolverines ===
In 1983, Illinois was led by sophomore quarterback Jack Trudeau. After a loss to Missouri in the first game of the 1983 season, the Illini won six consecutive games and came into the Michigan game ranked #9 in the AP poll. Michigan also suffered an early non-conference loss, to Washington, and came into the Illinois game ranked #8 in the AP poll. At a luncheon on the day before the game, Illinois coach Mike White threw a pie in the face of a man dressed to look like Michigan coach Schembechler. Before the game, White read a letter from Red Grange to his players.

Illinois won 16–6. Trudeau passed for 271 yards and two touchdowns, the first to Thomas Rooks and the other to David Williams, who was later inducted into the College Football Hall of Fame. On defense, the Illini held the Wolverines to 135 rushing yards, 110 passing yards, and two field goals. The Illini finished 10–2, 9–0 in conference play. They were ranked #4 before losing to unranked UCLA 45–9 in the 1984 Rose Bowl, and were dropped to be ranked #10 in the final AP poll.

=== 1985: Unranked Illini tie #4 Wolverines ===
On November 2, 1985, Illinois played the #4 Wolverines to a 3–3 tie at Memorial Stadium in Champaign. Senior quarterback Jack Trudeau completed 27 of 36 passes for 238 yards, and the Illini had a chance to win the game in the final seconds, but the 37-yard field goal attempt by Chris White, the son of Illinois head coach Mike White, was partially blocked by Dieter Heren and bounced off the crossbar. After the game, coach White said, "I've never felt worse after a football game -- I'm just sick."

=== 1989: #3 Michigan beats #8 Illinois ===
On November 11, 1989, Illinois and Michigan came into the game with both teams ranked in the top ten in the AP poll—Michigan at #3 and Illinois at #8. The Wolverines won 24–10 in their final season under head coach Bo Schembechler. Running back Tony Boles ran 73 yards for a touchdown on the second play of the game. Illinois was led by quarterback Jeff George.

=== 1990: #19 Michigan beats #17 Illinois ===
On November 10, 1990, #19 Michigan defeated #17 Illinois 22–17 at Michigan Stadium. Michigan placekicker J. D. Carlson tied a school record with five field goals in the game. Illinois quarterback Jason Verduzco led the Illini.

Gary Moeller, who succeeded Bo Schembechler as Michigan's head coach in 1990, had previously served as Illinois' head coach from 1977 to 1979.

=== 1991: #4 Michigan beats #25 Illinois ===
On November 16, 1991, #4 Michigan defeated #25 Illinois 20–0 at Memorial Stadium in Champaign. 1991 Heisman Trophy winner Desmond Howard caught a touchdown pass and also ran for a touchdown to lead the Wolverines.

=== 1992: Unranked Illinois plays #3 Michigan to a tie ===
On November 14, 1992, an unranked Illinois team led by Jason Verduzco played the undefeated, #3 Wolverines to a 22–22 tie at Michigan Stadium. Michigan had 10 fumbles and turned the ball over six times. After the game, Michigan coach Gary Moeller said of his team's fumbles: "That's sickening. I can't believe we handled the ball like that."

=== 1993: Unranked Illinois upsets #13 Michigan ===
On October 23, 1993, an unranked Illinois team upset the #13 Wolverines 24–21. Michigan took a 21–0 lead, but Illinois came back with two fourth quarter touchdowns. Quarterback Johnny Johnson scrambled and threw a touchdown pass to Jim Klein with 34 seconds left for the winning score. The victory was the first for Illinois at Michigan Stadium since 1966.

=== 1995: #13 Michigan beats #25 Illinois ===
On September 2, 1995, #13 Michigan defeated #25 Illinois 38–14 at Memorial Stadium in Champaign. Tim Biakabutuka scored three touchdowns in less than five minutes in the third quarter.

=== 1999: Unranked Illinois defeats #9 Michigan ===
On October 23, 1999, unranked Illinois defeated #9 Michigan 35–29 at Michigan Stadium. Illinois quarterback Kurt Kittner threw four touchdown passes in the game. Michigan, with Tom Brady at quarterback, led 27-7 midway through the third quarter, but the Illini finished the game with four unanswered touchdowns. Kittner completed 24 of 33 passes for 280 yards, and Brady completed 23 of 38 passes for 307 yards but also threw two interceptions.

== Recent years ==
=== 2000: #10 Michigan defeats #19 Illinois ===
On September 23, 2000, #10 Michigan beat #19 Illinois 35–31 at Memorial Stadium in Champaign. Michigan trailed 21–7 in the third quarter, but Drew Henson replaced John Navarre at quarterback and led the Wolverines to three late touchdowns. Anthony Thomas also rushed for 228 yards and two touchdowns.

=== 2001: Michigan defeats Big Ten champion Illinois ===
On September 29, 2001, #17 Michigan played #22 Illinois at Michigan Stadium before a crowd of 107,085. The Wolverines defeated the Illini 45–20. B. J. Askew rushed for 80 yards and two touchdowns. Despite the loss, Illinois, led by senior quarterback Kurt Kittner, went on to win the Big Ten championship and lost to LSU in the 2002 Sugar Bowl.

=== 2010: Big Ten record 132 points scored ===
2010: Illinois at Michigan

Team	1	2	3	4	OT	2OT	3OT	Total
Fighting Illini	6	25	0	14	7	7	6	65
• Wolverines	7	24	7	7	7	7	8	67

- Date: November 6, 2010
- Location: Michigan Stadium
- Game start: 12:00 pm
- Elapsed time: 3:51
- Game attendance: 111,441

Scoring summary
1	14:46	MICH	Roy Roundtree 75 yard pass from Denard Robinson (Seth Broekhuizen kick)	Michigan 7–0
1	8:56	ILL	Derek Dimke 44 yard field goal	Michigan 7–3
1	2:57	ILL	Derek Dimke 43 yard field goal	Michigan 7–6
2	14:57	ILL	Nathan Scheelhaase 2 yard run (Ryan Lankford pass from Nathan Scheelhaase)	Illinois 14–7
2	12:36	MICH	Roy Roundtree 33 yard pass from Denard Robinson (Seth Broekhuisen kick)	Tie 14–14
2	11:55	ILL	Jason Ford 62 yard run (Derek Dimke kick)	Illinois 21–14
2	6:56	MICH	Stephen Hopkins 4 yard run (Seth Broekhuizen kick)	Tie 21–21
2	3:01	MICH	Junior Hemingway 45 yard pass from Denard Robinson (Seth Broekhuizen kick)	Michigan 28–21
2	1:11	ILL	Ryan Lankford 33 yard pass from Nathan Scheelhaase (Derek Dimke kick)	Tie 28–28
2	:37	MICH	Seth Broekhuizen 35 yard field goal	Michigan 31–28
2	:03	ILL	Derek Dimke 43 yard field goal	Tie 31–31
3	7:36	MICH	Michael Shaw 18 yard run (Derek Broekhuizen kick)	Michigan 38–31
4	14:55	ILL	Mikel Leshoure 27 yard pass from Nathan Scheelhaase (Derek Dimke kick)	Tie 38–38
4	11:35	ILL	Mikel Leshoure 1 yard run (Derek Dimke kick)	Illinois 45–38
4	1:47	MICH	Daryl Stonum 9 yard pass from Tate Forcier (Seth Broekhuizen kick)	Tie 45–45
OT		MICH	Michael Shaw 5 yard run (Seth Broekhuizen kick)	Michigan 52–45
OT		ILL	Mikel Leshoure 1 yard run (Derek Dimke kick)	Tie 52–52
2OT		ILL	Mikel Leshoure 25 yard pass from Nathan Scheelhaase (Derek Dimke kick)	Illinois 59–52
2OT		MICH	Junior Hemingway 9 yard pass from Tate Forcier (Seth Broekhuizen kick)	Tie 59–59
3OT		MICH	Michael Shaw 1 yard run (Junior Hemingway pass from Tate Forcier)	Michigan 67–59
3OT		ILL	Mikel Leshoure 3 yard run (pass failed)	Michigan 67–65

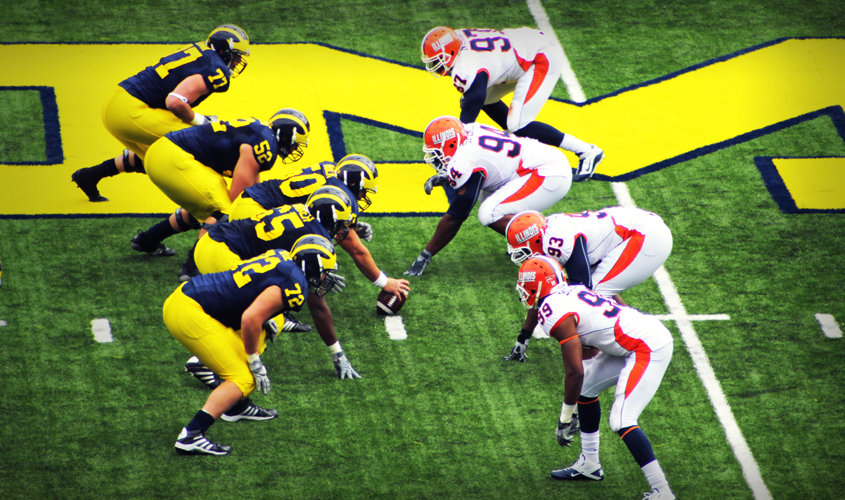
Michigan vs. Illinois, 2010

On November 6, 2010, Michigan defeated Illinois in triple overtime 67–65. The 132 points scored was the highest combined point total in Big Ten Conference history. Illinois' 65 points were also the most ever allowed by Michigan. It was also the highest scoring game in the NCAA's Football Bowl Subdivision since Navy defeated North Texas by a 74–62 score in 2007. Michigan's 419 passing yards in the game broke the program's single-game record of 396 yards, which was set against Michigan State in 1999. Roy Roundtree also set a Michigan record with 246 receiving yards, breaking the previous mark of 197 yards by Jack Clancy. The two teams combined for a total of 1,237 yards of offense, breaking the record of 1,189 set against Northwestern in 2000.

=== 2011–present: Big Ten realignment ===
The Big Ten realigned into two divisions after the 2011 addition of Nebraska and the 2014 additions of Maryland and Rutgers. Illinois and Michigan were placed in opposite divisions, meaning the two teams would no longer play each other annually. Since the 2011 realignment, the football teams have met five times: 2011 in Champaign, 2012 in Ann Arbor, 2016 in Ann Arbor, 2019 in Champaign, and 2022 in Ann Arbor, all Michigan victories. After the 2024 additions of Oregon, UCLA, USC, and Washington, the Big Ten eliminated the divisional format and announced future conference schedules from 2024 to 2028. The football teams will meet twice during this span, 2024 in Champaign and 2027 in Ann Arbor.

When the teams met in October 2024, 100 years and a day after Red Grange's breakout performance against Michigan, Illinois celebrated the long history of the series by conducting a rededication ceremony for Memorial Stadium and wearing throwback uniforms and hand-painted helmets from the Grange era. Illinois beat Michigan, their first game against the Wolverines since 2009 and also their first victory over a ranked Michigan since 1983.
