= Lyall Smith =

American sportswriter (1914–1991)

- Born: November 22, 1914; Peoria, Illinois, U.S.
- Died: October 8, 1991 (aged 76); Detroit, Michigan, U.S.
- Occupation: Sportswriter

Lyall F. Smith (November 22, 1914 – October 8, 1991) was an American sports writer and editor. He was the sports editor and columnist for the Detroit Free Press from 1945 to 1965 and the president of the Baseball Writers' Association of America from 1955 to 1956. He later served as the public relations director and business manager for the Detroit Lions from 1965 to 1980.

== Early years ==
A native of Peoria, Illinois, he attended Bradley University and the University of Illinois. He was inducted into the Bradley University Athletic Hall of Fame in 1950.

Smith began his career in journalism as a reporter for the Chicago Daily News. He spent seven years with the Chicago Daily News from 1938 to 1945. He claimed to have given the "Whiz Kids" nickname to the 1943 Illinois basketball team.

== Detroit Free Press ==
In March 1945, Smith was hired as the sports editor and columnist at the Detroit Free Press, a position he held until 1965.

During his time with the Free Press Smith was included in the committee of baseball writers charged with selecting the American League Most Valuable Player.

In 1947, Smith became involved in a controversy over competing claims to the national collegiate football championship by undefeated teams from Notre Dame and Michigan. Notre Dame was ranked No. 1 in the final regular season AP Poll, but Michigan went on to defeat USC by a score of 49-0 in the Rose Bowl. Smith urged the Associated Press to conduct a post-bowl poll, arguing that Michigan had defeated three common opponents by larger margins than Notre Dame and had a tougher schedule. After Smith's comments, the AP agreed to conduct a post-bowl poll, the first of its kind, and Michigan was selected as the national champion in that poll by a vote of 226 to 119. After the results were tallied, Smith wrote in The Sporting News, "Michigan won another football battle!"

Also in January 1947, Smith broke the story of the Detroit Tigers' decision to sell Hank Greenberg to the Pittsburgh Pirates. Smith reported that Tigers owner Walter O. Briggs had read comments from Greenberg about his desire to play for the Yankees and concluded that "Greenberg was ungrateful, unkind and unfair to Detroit," and ordered the team's general manager to "get rid of Hank."

In August 1948, three days after the death of Babe Ruth from cancer, Smith proposed that Major League Baseball designate September 30, 1948 as "Babe Ruth Day" and that all proceeds from games played on that day be donated to cancer research.

Smith's 1948 tribute to Harry Heilmann, former batting champ and radio voice of the tigers, was published in The Sporting News. Smith wrote:

"[H]e is so good that if he gets any better there'll be no more attendance records set at Briggs Stadium. After all, who wants to leave that nice, soft easy chair to be pushed around with 50,000 other fans when he can stay right at home and get a word picture ... with anectodes ... of the game. Only thing wrong with his broadcasts is that you hate to get out of your chair and rush to the ice box to get a bottle of that cool stuff he mentions now and then."

In October 1954, Smith was elected as the vice president of the Baseball Writers' Association of America.

In the spring of 1955, Smith asked readers to submit ideas for a nickname for the Tigers' star right-fielder Al Kaline. From the submissions, Smith chose "Salty," which the reader explained, "After all, salt means alkaline."

In September 1955, he was elected as the president of the Baseball Writers' Association of America and served in that role in 1956. Smith also served as a director of the Football Writers Association of America for several years.

Smith was chosen as the chief scorer for the 1956 World Series, and was the scorer for Don Larsen's perfect game in the World Series. Fellow sportswriter Arthur Daley noted, "By the ninth inning, the most nervous people in the ball park, bar none, were the three official scorers, Lyall Smith of Detroit and his two assistants ... They were terrified that a questionable decision would confront them and ruin Larsen's performance for posterity." Larsen, too, acknowledged that he was not the only nervous person at Yankee Stadium as the game progressed, acknowledging the scrutiny that would be given to any close calls by Smith as he sat in the press box as the official scorer.

In May 1965, Smith was chosen to serve a five-year term on the board of directors of the Michigan Sports Hall of Fame.

== Detroit Lions ==
In September 1965, Smith left the Free Press to accept a position as the public relations director for the Detroit Lions. In January 1967, Smith took on the additional title and responsibility as the Lions' business manager. Over the next 15 years, Smith was employed by the Lions as their public relations director, business manager, and director of marketing. When the Lions moved to the Pontiac Silverdome in 1975, Smith was responsible for coordinating the move and organized an exhibition day game in August 1975 for fans to orient themselves and tour the new facility. He remained with the Lions throughout the 1970s.

== Death ==
Smith died of heart failure in 1991 at Henry Ford Hospital in Detroit.

== Selected articles by Smith ==
- My Greatest Diamond Thrill, By Lou Boudreau, As Told To Lyall Smith: Long Homers Off Rigney Gave Shortstop Top Kick (Lou Boudreau), The Sporting News, November 18, 1943, page 9
- Tar Explosion Blew Roy Hughes Back Into Big Time (Roy Hughes), The Sporting News, July 27, 1944, page 6
- Wanted: First Base Idol, Baseball Digest, April 1948
- Basemen Beware!, Baseball Digest, May 1948
- Rowdy Richard Tells About a $1,050 Row: Run-In With Umpire Cost Bartell Chance for .300 Mark and Pay Raise -- Fined $50 (Dick Bartell), The Sporting News, December 29, 1948, page 6
- The 'Sec' Is an Aspirin Man, Baseball Digest, March 1949
- Kell Calls Greenberg Greatest Sign-Stealer (George Kell/Hank Greenberg), The Sporting News, April 6, 1949, page 2
- Groth Detroit's Biggest Rave Since Cobb (Johnny Groth), The Sporting News, May 4, 1949, page 3
- Gray Brightens Tigers Mound Picture (Ted Gray), The Sporting News, May 25, 1949, page 3
- Veeck Loses Midas Touch (Bill Veeck), The Sporting News, June 1, 1949, page 12
- Bengals' Late Blaze Kindled By Red-Head Rolfe (Red Rolfe), The Sporting News, September 21, 1949, page 5
- Matty Just a 'Cousin' to Brownie (Christy Mathewson), Baseball Digest, July 1949
- Onus the Bonus, Baseball Digest, June 1950
- Art Off to Fast Start, Shows Fine Control (Art Houtteman), The Sporting News, June 14, 1950, page 5
- Kell Pounds Out Hits and Sports Columns, Too (George Kell), The Sporting News, July 5, 1950, page 1
- Why Not Play 154 Games?, Baseball Digest, November 1950
- How Can Michigan Ever Forget 'Forgotten' Man (Carl Kreager/Snow Bowl), The Sporting News, December 6, 1950, page 54
- Three Clubs Hit $600,000 Pay, Baseball Digest, March 1951&oi=book_result&ct=result&resnum=3&ved=0CDkQ6AEwAjge#v=onepage&q=lyall%20smith&f=false Onus the Bonus], Baseball Digest, June 1950
- $30,000 Outside Job Offer Tempted Hal to Quit Game (Hal Newhouser), The Sporting News, March 7, 1951, page 21
- 'Be Yourself,' Move Up Spot in Flag Race, Tigers Advised (1951 Detroit Tigers), The Sporting News, March 21, 1951, page 19
- Tiger Rookie Hoeft, 18, Given Chance to Win Place on Roster: Kid Phenom Faced All 27 Batters He Faced in Wisconsin School Game (Billy Hoeft), The Sporting News, March 28, 1951, page 7
- Williams' Homer Made '41 All-Star Game Tops (Ted Williams), The Sporting News, July 11, 1951, page 4
- The Trouble with the Red Sox, Baseball Digest, August 1951
- Same Situation -- Same Strategy, Baseball Digest, January 1952
- Overhead Exposure, Baseball Digest, May 1952
- 'Caught' Both Tiger No-Hitters (Oscar Stanage), Baseball Digest, August 1952
- "Tip From Ted Kept Kaline Swinging Bat All Winter," The Sporting News, March 3, 1954, page 4
- Tigers Hope He's A House Afire (Frank House), Baseball Digest, May 1954
- The law of the pot and the kettle ... , Sports Illustrated, October 4, 1954
- Kaline's a Big Man Now (Al Kaline), Baseball Digest, May 1955
- Big Pitchers Grow in Cages, Baseball Digest, June 1955
- The File on Kaline, Baseball Digest, July 1955
- "Lip Gives Kaline Pay-Boost Advice," The Sporting News, November 16, 1955, page 7
- Will Tape Measure Hurt Mickey?, Baseball Digest, August 1956
- Mantle Wastes Talent!, Baseball Digest, June 1957
- Standing Ducks, Baseball Digest, July 1957
- They Called Him a Busher (Joe McCarthy), Baseball Digest, August 1957
- After 47 Straight N.Y. Wins, Baseball Digest, December 1957
- 20-Game Winners a Luxury!, Baseball Digest, May 1958
- Meet the Tigers' New Manager (Bill Norman), Baseball Digest, August 1958
- If Hitchcock Wrote Diamond History, Baseball Digest, March 1959
- They Finally Separated the Wheat from the Chaff (Zack Wheat), Baseball Digest, April 1959
- The Day the Mighty Met, Baseball Digest, July 1959
- Revival Time in the A.L., Baseball Digest, August 1959
- N0Hit Pitchers Fall by Wayside, Baseball Digest, September 1959
- The Gashouse Gang -- Laughing Gas, That Is, Baseball Digest, July 1960
- How About Rotating Pilots?, Baseball Digest, January 1961
- One of the Wildest Games Ever, Baseball Digest, August 1961
- Some Rules Are A Bit Wavy, Baseball Digest, May 1962
- Why Stengel Nixed Detroit Job, then Took Mets' Offer (Casey Stengel), Baseball Digest, May 1962
- How York Used Batting Science to Set Homer Mark (Rudy York), Baseball Digest, July 1962
- Bus Ride Back to Stardom?, Baseball Digest, July 1963
- What the Braves Owe to Milwaukee, Baseball Digest, September 1964
- It's First Time in 49 Years There's No Dykes on Field, Baseball Digest, May 1965
- Beat the Clock! (Bobby Bragan), Baseball Digest, September 1965
