= 1948 Rose Bowl =

American college football game

- 34th Rose Bowl Game
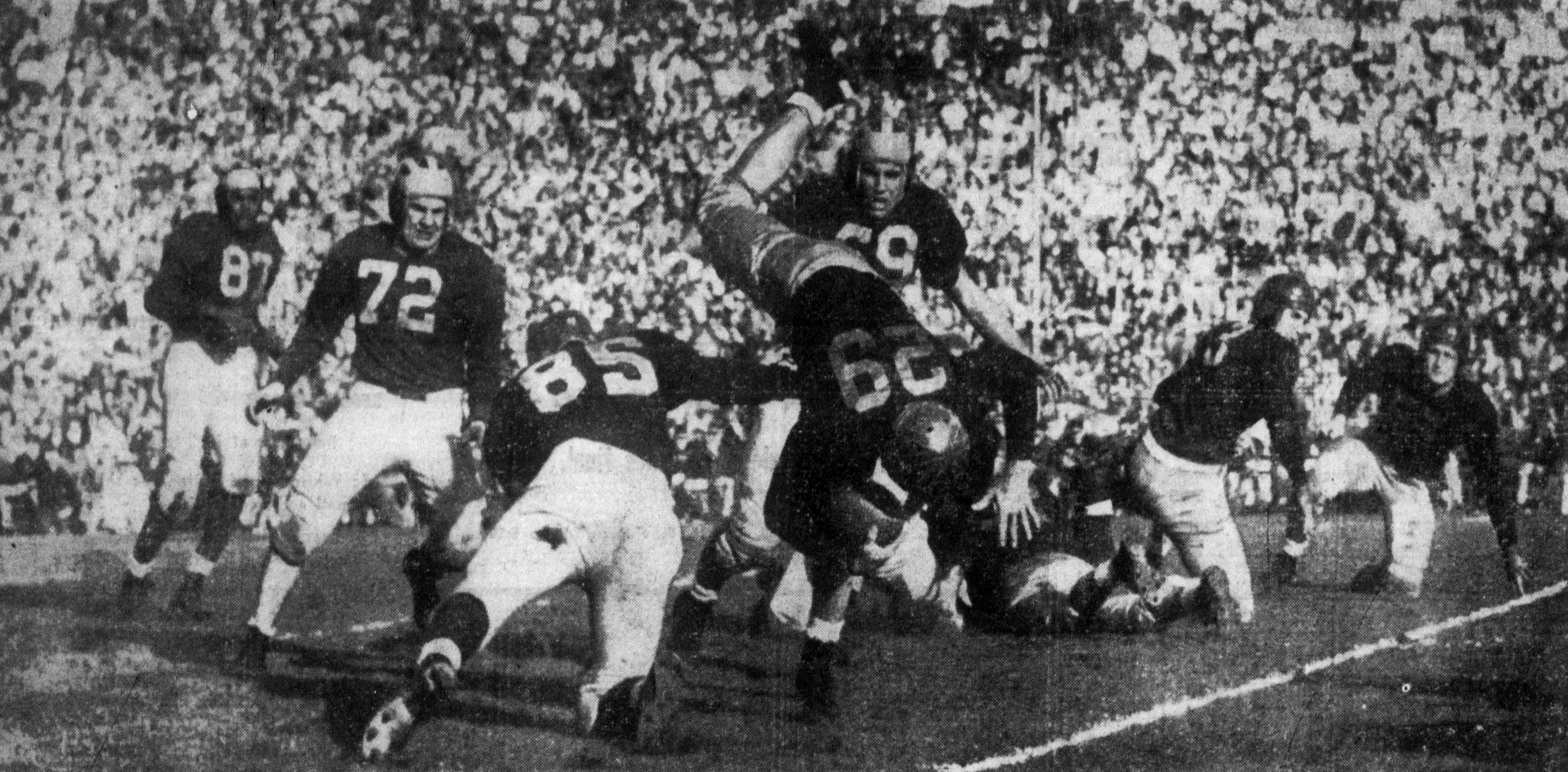
- 1948 Rose Bowl
USC Trojans	Michigan Wolverines
(7–1–1)	(9–0)
PCC	Big Nine
0	49
Head coach: Jeff Cravath	Head coach: Fritz Crisler
AP 8	AP 2
	1	2	3	4	Total
USC	0	0	0	0	0
Michigan	7	14	7	21	49
- Date: January 1, 1948
- Season: 1947
- Stadium: Rose Bowl
- Location: Pasadena, California
- MVP: Bob Chappuis (Michigan HB)
- Favorite: Michigan by 15
- National anthem: Spirit of Troy
- Referee: Russell Rupp (Big Nine; split crew: Big Nine, Pacific Coast)
- Halftime show: Michigan Marching Band Spirit of Troy
- Attendance: 93,000 (estimated)

The 1948 Rose Bowl was the 34th edition of the college football bowl game, played at the Rose Bowl in Pasadena, California on Thursday, January 1. The second-ranked and undefeated Michigan Wolverines of the Big Nine Conference routed the #8 USC Trojans, champions of the Pacific Coast Conference, 49–0.

It was the second year of the initial five-year agreement between the conferences to match their champions each New Year's Day in Pasadena. Michigan halfback Bob Chappuis was named the Player of the Game when the award was created in 1953 and selections were made retroactively.

Michigan tied the record for the most points scored by a team in the Rose Bowl, first set by the 1901 Wolverines in the first Rose Bowl and later matched by USC in 2008. Oregon supplanted the record in 2015. Michigan also tied the game's record for largest margin of victory also set by the 1901 Michigan team that defeated Stanford by an identical 49–0 score. The record of seven PATs converted by Michigan kicker Jim Brieske remains unbroken, but was tied in 2008 by USC's David Buehler.

The game was aired by local station KTLA in the first telecast of a bowl game in the Greater Los Angeles Area. It was also the first time a U.S. motion picture newsreel was taken in color. In a special unofficial AP poll five days after the game, Michigan replaced Notre Dame as the 1947 national champion by a vote of 226 to 119.

== Teams ==
=== USC Trojans ===
In October, USC tied Rice 7–7 and defeated #4 California 39–14 in Berkeley. The Trojans' rivalry matchup with defending PCC champion UCLA saw USC win 6–0. The game against Notre Dame had 104,953 on hand, the highest attendance for a football game in the Los Angeles Memorial Coliseum, to see 7–0–1 Rose Bowl-bound USC fall to the 8–0 Fighting Irish, 38–7. USC dropped from third to eighth in the final AP poll in early December, and Notre Dame did not play in a bowl.

=== Michigan Wolverines ===
The 1947 Wolverines, known as the "Mad Magicians," won the Big Nine title on the strength of strong offense and defense. They shut out four opponents, including Ohio State, 21–0. Their closest game was a 14–7 win at #11 Illinois, the reigning Big Nine and Rose Bowl champion.

== Game summary ==
Bob Chappuis and Bump Elliott were the stars for the Wolverines. Jack Weisenburger scored three touchdowns. Nine Rose Bowl records were set.

=== Scoring ===
==== First quarter ====
- Michigan - Jack Weisenburger, 1-yard run (Jim Brieske kick)

==== Second quarter ====
- Michigan - Jack Weisenburger, 1-yard run (Jim Brieske kick)
- Michigan - Bump Elliott, 11-yard pass from Bob Chappuis (Jim Brieske kick)

==== Third quarter ====
- Michigan - Howard Yerges, 18-yard pass from Bob Chappuis (Jim Brieske kick)

==== Fourth quarter ====
- Michigan - Jack Weisenburger, 1-yard run (Jim Brieske kick)
- Michigan - Gene Derricotte, 45-yard pass from Hank Fonde (Jim Brieske kick)
- Michigan - Dick Rifenberg, 29-yard pass from Howard Yerges (Jim Brieske kick)

== Aftermath ==
The final regular season AP [oll, taken before the bowls, had Notre Dame No. 1 (107 first place votes) and Michigan No. 2 (25 first place votes). Notre Dame did not play in a bowl game. After urging from Detroit Free Press sports editor Lyall Smith, the Associated Press conducted its first ever post-bowl poll; Michigan won that unofficial final poll, 266–119.

The Wolverines continued their winning streak through the next season, winning all nine games. Because of the no-repeat rule for the Rose Bowl, runner-up Northwestern represented the Big Nine in the 1949 Rose Bowl. Michigan's 1,788 passing yards in 1947 was a school record that stood for 32 years, until 1979.

== Legacy ==
In Super Bowl LIV, the Kansas City Chiefs offense lined up for a 4th & 1 conversion attempt during the first quarter. The offense attempted a running back direct snap, converting the run for a first down. After the game, Chiefs' offensive coordinator Eric Bieniemy told the media he discovered the trick play from watching Michigan run the play on the goal line in the 1948 Rose Bowl, adding it to the team's repertoire. Kansas City went on to win the game. The play was even named shift right to Rose Bowl parade.
