= 1947 Oregon Ducks football team =

American college football season

1947 Oregon Ducks football
- Conference: Pacific Coast Conference
- Record: 7–3 (5–1 PCC)
- Head coach: Jim Aiken (1st season)
- Captains: Jake Leicht; James Newquist; Robert Koch
- Home stadium: Hayward Field

1947 Pacific Coast Conference football standings
	Conf.					Overall
Team	W		L		T	W		L		T
No. 8 USC $	6	–	0	–	0	7	–	2	–	1
No. 15 California	5	–	1	–	0	9	–	1	–	0
Oregon	5	–	1	–	0	7	–	3	–	0
UCLA	4	–	2	–	0	5	–	4	–	0
Montana	2	–	1	–	0	7	–	4	–	0
Oregon State	3	–	4	–	0	5	–	5	–	0
Washington	2	–	5	–	0	3	–	6	–	0
Washington State	2	–	5	–	0	3	–	7	–	0
Idaho	1	–	4	–	0	4	–	4	–	0
Stanford	0	–	7	–	0	0	–	9	–	0
$ – Conference champion; Rankings from AP Poll

The 1947 Oregon Ducks football team was an American football team that represented the University of Oregon in the Pacific Coast Conference (PCC) during the 1947 college football season. In its first season under head coach Jim Aiken, the team compiled a 7–3 record (5–1 in PCC, tie for second), and outscored their opponents 174 to 121.

Quarterback Norm Van Brocklin led the PCC with 76 completions for 939 passing yards and an average of 40.1 yards per punt. Halfback Jake Leicht led the conference with 630 rushing yards on 119 carries. Dan Garza led the team in scoring with 30 points.

Three Oregon players were honored on the All-Coast teams selected by the PCC coaches, the United Press (UP) and Associated Press (AP): Van Brocklin at quarterback (AP-1, UP-1, Coaches-1); Leicht at halfback (Coaches-1, UP-1); and Brad Ecklund (Coaches-1).

Oregon was ranked at No. 36 (out of 500 college football teams) in the final Litkenhous Ratings for 1947.

Oregon played its home games on campus at Hayward Field in Eugene.

== Schedule ==
Date	Opponent	Site	Result	Attendance	Source
September 20	Montana State*	Hayward Field; Eugene, OR	W 27–14	11,500	
September 27	Texas*	Multnomah Stadium; Portland, OR	L 13–38	> 30,000	
October 4	Nevada*	Hayward Field; Eugene, OR	L 6–13	10,000	
October 11	at UCLA	Los Angeles Memorial Coliseum; Los Angeles, CA	L 7–24	43,713	
October 18	Washington	Multnomah Stadium; Portland, OR	W 6–0	24,588	
October 25	No. 20 San Francisco*	Hayward Field; Eugene, OR	W 34–7	11,400	
November 1	Idaho	Hayward Field; Eugene, OR	W 34–7	8,300	
November 8	at Washington State	Rogers Field; Pullman, WA	W 12–6	13,500	
November 15	at Stanford	Stanford Stadium; Stanford, CA	W 21–6	12,000	
November 22	Oregon State^{†}	Hayward Field; Eugene, OR (Civil War)	W 14–6	20,000	
*Non-conference game; ^{†}Homecoming; Rankings from AP Poll released prior to the game
