= 1947 Washington Huskies football team =

American college football season

1947 Washington Huskies football
- Conference: Pacific Coast Conference
- Record: 3–6 (2–5 PCC)
- Head coach: Ralph Welch (6th season)
- Captain: Gail Bruce
- Home stadium: University of Washington Stadium

1947 Pacific Coast Conference football standings
	Conf.					Overall
Team	W		L		T	W		L		T
No. 8 USC $	6	–	0	–	0	7	–	2	–	1
No. 15 California	5	–	1	–	0	9	–	1	–	0
Oregon	5	–	1	–	0	7	–	3	–	0
UCLA	4	–	2	–	0	5	–	4	–	0
Montana	2	–	1	–	0	7	–	4	–	0
Oregon State	3	–	4	–	0	5	–	5	–	0
Washington	2	–	5	–	0	3	–	6	–	0
Washington State	2	–	5	–	0	3	–	7	–	0
Idaho	1	–	4	–	0	4	–	4	–	0
Stanford	0	–	7	–	0	0	–	9	–	0
$ – Conference champion; Rankings from AP Poll

The 1947 Washington Huskies football team was an American football team that represented the University of Washington as a member of the Pacific Coast Conference (PCC) during the 1947 college football season. In its sixth season under head coach Ralph Welch, the team compiled a 3–6 record (2–5 against PCC opponents), finished seventh in the PCC, and was outscored by a total of 99 to 98. Gail Bruce was the team captain.

Washington was ranked at No. 33 (out of 500 college football teams) in the final Litkenhous Ratings for 1947.

== Schedule ==
Date	Opponent	Rank	Site	Result	Attendance	Source
September 27	at Minnesota*		Memorial Stadium; Minneapolis, MN	L 6–7	43,377	
October 4	Oregon State		University of Washington Stadium; Seattle, WA	L 7–14	39,000	
October 11	Saint Mary's*		University of Washington Stadium; Seattle, WA	W 26–6	39,000	
October 18	vs. Oregon		Multnomah Stadium; Portland, OR (rivalry)	L 0–6	24,588	
October 25	Stanford		University of Washington Stadium; Seattle, WA	W 25–0	32,000	
November 1	No. 5 USC		University of Washington Stadium; Seattle, WA	L 0–19	32,000	
November 8	at California	No. 12	California Memorial Stadium; Berkeley, CA	L 7–13	50,000	
November 15	at UCLA		Los Angeles Memorial Coliseum; Los Angeles, CA	L 7–34	43,777	
November 22	Washington State		University of Washington Stadium; Seattle, WA (rivalry)	W 20–0	31,500	
*Non-conference game; Rankings from AP Poll released prior to the game

== Professional football draft selections ==
Three University of Washington Huskies were selected in the 1948 NFL draft, which lasted 32 rounds with 300 selections. The same three Huskies were also selected in the 1948 AAFC Draft, which lasted 30 rounds with 217 selections.

= Husky Hall of Fame

League	Player	Position	Round	Pick	Club
NFL	Dick Otelle	Back	9	1	New York Giants
NFL	Fred Provo	Back	14	6	Green Bay Packers
NFL	Bob Levenhagen	Guard	25	5	Los Angeles Rams
AAFC	Dick Ottele	Back	13	7	New York Yankees
AAFC	Bob Levenhagen	Guard	17	4	Los Angeles Dons
AAFC	Fred Provo	Back	21	1	Chicago Rockets
