= 1947 Idaho Vandals football team =

American college football season

1947 Idaho Vandals football
- Conference: Pacific Coast Conference
- Record: 4–4 (1–4 PCC)
- Head coach: Dixie Howell (1st season)
- Home stadium: Neale Stadium

1947 Pacific Coast Conference football standings
	Conf.					Overall
Team	W		L		T	W		L		T
No. 8 USC $	6	–	0	–	0	7	–	2	–	1
No. 15 California	5	–	1	–	0	9	–	1	–	0
Oregon	5	–	1	–	0	7	–	3	–	0
UCLA	4	–	2	–	0	5	–	4	–	0
Montana	2	–	1	–	0	7	–	4	–	0
Oregon State	3	–	4	–	0	5	–	5	–	0
Washington	2	–	5	–	0	3	–	6	–	0
Washington State	2	–	5	–	0	3	–	7	–	0
Idaho	1	–	4	–	0	4	–	4	–	0
Stanford	0	–	7	–	0	0	–	9	–	0
$ – Conference champion; Rankings from AP Poll

The 1947 Idaho Vandals football team represented the University of Idaho in the 1947 college football season. The Vandals were led by first-year head coach Dixie Howell, and were members of the Pacific Coast Conference. Home games were played on campus in Moscow at Neale Stadium, with one game in Boise at Public School Field. The Vandals were 4–4 overall and 1–4 in conference play.

Howell, age 34, had been the head coach at Arizona State before the war and was a finalist for the Idaho job six years earlier in 1941, which went to Francis Schmidt. He played with Don Hutson and Bear Bryant at Alabama, and was the passer and a consensus All-American on the undefeated 1934 team that won the Rose Bowl and the national title.

Idaho was ranked at No. 119 (out of 500 college football teams) in the final Litkenhous Ratings for 1947.

Led on the field by 26-year-old passing halfback Billy (The Rifle) Williams, Idaho compiled a 4–4 overall record.

The Vandals opened the season at home with a 27–7 win over the Puget Sound Loggers of Tacoma, then traveled to northern California and defeated Stanford 19–16, their only win in the series, after five defeats. After a 6–3–1 season the previous year, Stanford fielded one of its poorest teams in 1947 and went winless at 0–9. (They have met only once since, Stanford crushed Idaho 63–0 two years later in 1949.)

At the time, it was thought to be the first Idaho football win over a California school in the PCC, and 5,000 greeted the team at the Moscow train station on Monday morning; classes were canceled and the public schools were closed. It was actually the second win, as first-year member UCLA lost in Moscow in 1928. But it stands as the only road win and the most recent overall, as Idaho has not defeated any of the four California schools of the present-day Pac-12 in football since then, with winless all-time records against USC (0–9) and California (0–4).

The next week, the undefeated Vandals suffered a nineteenth straight loss in the Battle of the Palouse with neighbor Washington State, falling 7–0 at homecoming in Moscow. With the excitement after the win at Stanford, the game at Neale Stadium drew an overflow attendance of 22,500, then a record gathering of any kind for the Palouse and the state of Idaho. The loss ran the winless streak against the Cougars to 21 games, a record of 0–20–1 since taking three straight from 1923 to 1925; the Vandals tied again in 1950 and finally broke the streak in 1954 in Pullman.

The road victory over Stanford was Idaho's only win in the PCC in 1947, and struggled on offense with just thirteen points scored in their four losses. That included a humbling 21–0 shutout at home to Montana for the Little Brown Stein on a Friday afternoon in November; the Grizzlies had also won with a shutout the previous year, 19–0 in Missoula. The season finale the next week in Boise was an improvement, with a 13–6 upset of Utah in the rain at Public School Field to finish at 4–4. It was the first Vandal football game in Boise in five years and had a record overflow crowd; Idaho improved its record in Boise games (southern homecoming) to 12–0–2 (they won the next three years, then only three of nine from 1951–59).

Following the war and the single-win seasons of the previous two years, the 1947 team had the best record since 1938. Despite the improvement, it was Howell's best season at Idaho and a winning football season was still sixteen years away; the 1963 team went 5–4 under Dee Andros (with the final game canceled). In between, two seasons also had even .500 records: 1952 and 1957.

== Schedule ==
Date	Time	Opponent	Site	Result	Attendance	Source
September 20	2:00 pm	Puget Sound*	Neale Stadium; Moscow, ID	W 27–7	7,500	
September 27	2:30 pm	at Stanford	Stanford Stadium; Stanford, CA	W 19–16	15,000	
October 4	2:00 pm	Washington State^{†}	Neale Stadium; Moscow, ID (Battle of the Palouse)	L 0–7	22,500	
October 11	2:00 pm	at Oregon State	Bell Field; Corvallis, OR	L 6–33	10,000	
October 18		Portland*	Neale Stadium; Moscow, ID	W 20–14	6,000	
November 1	2:00 pm	at Oregon	Hayward Field; Eugene, OR	L 7–34	8,300	
November 7	2:00 pm	Montana	Neale Stadium; Moscow, ID (Little Brown Stein)	L 0–21	5,000	
November 15		vs. Utah*	Public School Field; Boise, ID	W 13–6	8,000	
*Non-conference game; ^{†}Homecoming; All times are in Pacific time

== All-conference ==
No Vandals were named to the All-Coast team; halfback Billy Williams was named to the third team. Honorable mention were end Orville Barnes, tackle Will Overgaard, and guard Jack Dana.

== NFL draft ==
One senior from the 1947 Vandals was selected in the 1948 NFL draft:

Player	Position	Round	Pick	Franchise
Ed Watkins	T	27th	248	Washington Redskins

Two sophomores were selected in the 1950 NFL draft:

Player	Position	Round	Pick	Franchise
Carl Kiilsgaard	T	5th	61	Chicago Cardinals
Jerry Diehl	HB	28th	360	Pittsburgh Steelers
