= 1947 Oregon State Beavers football team =

American college football season

1947 Oregon State Beavers football
- Head Coach Lon Stiner
- Conference: Pacific Coast Conference
- Record: 5–5 (3–4 PCC)
- Head coach: Lon Stiner (13th season)
- Home stadium: Bell Field; Multnomah Stadium

1947 Pacific Coast Conference football standings
	Conf.					Overall
Team	W		L		T	W		L		T
No. 8 USC $	6	–	0	–	0	7	–	2	–	1
No. 15 California	5	–	1	–	0	9	–	1	–	0
Oregon	5	–	1	–	0	7	–	3	–	0
UCLA	4	–	2	–	0	5	–	4	–	0
Montana	2	–	1	–	0	7	–	4	–	0
Oregon State	3	–	4	–	0	5	–	5	–	0
Washington	2	–	5	–	0	3	–	6	–	0
Washington State	2	–	5	–	0	3	–	7	–	0
Idaho	1	–	4	–	0	4	–	4	–	0
Stanford	0	–	7	–	0	0	–	9	–	0
$ – Conference champion; Rankings from AP Poll

The 1947 Oregon State Beavers football team was an American football team that represented Oregon State College in the Pacific Coast Conference (PCC) during the 1947 college football season. Led by thirteenth-year head coach Lon Stiner, the team compiled a 5–5 record (3–4 in PCC, sixth), and outscored their opponents 171 to 136.

Oregon State was ranked at No. 52 (out of 500 college football teams) in the final Litkenhous Ratings for 1947.

The Beavers played three home games on campus at Bell Field in Corvallis and one at Multnomah Stadium in Portland.

No Oregon State players were named to the All-Coast team.

== Schedule ==
Date	Opponent	Site	Result	Attendance	Source
September 27	at Utah*	Ute Stadium; Salt Lake City, UT	L 6–7	22,175	
October 4	at Washington	Husky Stadium; Seattle, WA	W 14–7	39,000	
October 11	Idaho	Bell Field; Corvallis, OR	W 33–6	10,000	
October 18	at No. 11 USC	Los Angeles Memorial Coliseum; Los Angeles, CA	L 6–48	61,301	
October 25	Portland*	Bell Field; Corvallis, OR	W 46–0	6,657	
November 1	at Stanford	Stanford Stadium; Stanford, CA	W 13–7	9,000	
November 8	UCLA	Multnomah Stadium; Portland, OR	L 7–27	30,870	
November 15	Washington State	Bell Field; Corvallis, OR	L 13–14	14,000	
November 22	at Oregon	Hayward Field; Eugene, OR (Civil War)	L 6–14	20,211	
November 29	at Nebraska*	Memorial Stadium; Lincoln, NE	W 27–6	20,000	
*Non-conference game; Rankings from AP Poll released prior to the game
