= 1947 Washington State Cougars football team =

American college football season

1947 Washington State Cougars football
- Conference: Pacific Coast Conference
- Record: 3–7 (2–5 PCC)
- Head coach: Phil Sarboe (3rd season)
- Home stadium: Rogers Field

1947 Pacific Coast Conference football standings
	Conf.					Overall
Team	W		L		T	W		L		T
No. 8 USC $	6	–	0	–	0	7	–	2	–	1
No. 15 California	5	–	1	–	0	9	–	1	–	0
Oregon	5	–	1	–	0	7	–	3	–	0
UCLA	4	–	2	–	0	5	–	4	–	0
Montana	2	–	1	–	0	7	–	4	–	0
Oregon State	3	–	4	–	0	5	–	5	–	0
Washington	2	–	5	–	0	3	–	6	–	0
Washington State	2	–	5	–	0	3	–	7	–	0
Idaho	1	–	4	–	0	4	–	4	–	0
Stanford	0	–	7	–	0	0	–	9	–	0
$ – Conference champion; Rankings from AP Poll

The 1947 Washington State Cougars football team was an American football team that represented Washington State College in the Pacific Coast Conference (PCC) during the 1947 college football season. Phil Sarboe, in his third of five seasons as head coach at Washington State, led the team to a 2–5 mark in the PCC and 3–7 overall.

Washington State was ranked at No. 64 (out of 500 college football teams) in the final Litkenhous Ratings for 1947.

The Cougars' three home games were played on campus in Pullman at Rogers Field, with a nearby road game in Moscow against Palouse neighbor Idaho.

== Schedule ==
Date	Opponent	Site	Result	Attendance	Source
September 20	vs. Penn State*	Hersheypark Stadium; Hershey, PA	L 6–27	16,000	
September 27	at USC	Los Angeles Memorial Coliseum; Los Angeles, CA	L 0–21	48,173	
October 4	at Idaho	Neale Stadium; Moscow, ID (rivalry)	W 7–0	22,500	
October 11	Michigan State*	Rogers Field; Pullman, WA	L 7–21	18,000	
October 18	at California	California Memorial Stadium; Berkeley, CA	L 6–21	36,000	
October 25	Montana	Rogers Field; Pullman, WA	L 12–13	13,000	
November 1	at Portland*	Multnomah Stadium; Portland, OR	W 35–0		
November 8	Oregon^{†}	Rogers Field; Pullman, WA	L 6–12	13,500	
November 15	at Oregon State	Bell Field; Corvallis, OR	W 14–13	12,400	
November 22	at Washington	Husky Stadium; Seattle, WA (rivalry)	L 0–20	31,500	
*Non-conference game; ^{†}Homecoming
