= 1947 Montana Grizzlies football team =

American college football season

1947 Montana Grizzlies football
- Conference: Pacific Coast Conference
- Record: 7–4 (2–1 PCC)
- Head coach: Doug Fessenden (9th season)
- Captains: Sam Leeper; Ben Tyvand
- Home stadium: Dornblaser Field

1947 Pacific Coast Conference football standings
	Conf.					Overall
Team	W		L		T	W		L		T
No. 8 USC $	6	–	0	–	0	7	–	2	–	1
No. 15 California	5	–	1	–	0	9	–	1	–	0
Oregon	5	–	1	–	0	7	–	3	–	0
UCLA	4	–	2	–	0	5	–	4	–	0
Montana	2	–	1	–	0	7	–	4	–	0
Oregon State	3	–	4	–	0	5	–	5	–	0
Washington	2	–	5	–	0	3	–	6	–	0
Washington State	2	–	5	–	0	3	–	7	–	0
Idaho	1	–	4	–	0	4	–	4	–	0
Stanford	0	–	7	–	0	0	–	9	–	0
$ – Conference champion; Rankings from AP Poll

The 1947 Montana Grizzlies football team was an American football team that represented the University of Montana as a member of the Pacific Coast Conference (PCC) during the 1947 college football season.

Under ninth-year head coach Doug Fessenden, Montana compiled a 7–4 record (2–1 in PCC), with home games played on campus at Dornblaser Field in Missoula, Montana.

The coaching staff included Harry Adams as backs coach and Paul Szakash as line coach.

Montana was ranked at No. 110 (out of 500 college football teams) in the final Litkenhous Ratings for 1947.

== Schedule ==
Date	Opponent	Site	Result	Attendance	Source
September 20	at Eastern Washington*	Gonzaga Stadium; Spokane, WA (rivlary)	W 21–0	7,000	
September 27	Portland*	Dornblaser Field; Missoula, MT	W 21–0	5,000	
October 4	at Arizona*	Arizona Stadium; Tucson, AZ	L 7–40	14,300	
October 11	at Utah State*	Romney Stadium; Logan, UT	L 7–13	5,000	
October 18	vs. Montana State*	Naranche Stadium; Butte, MT (rivalry)	L 12–13	10,350	
October 25	at Washington State	Rogers Field; Pullman, WA	W 13–12	13,000	
November 7	at Idaho	Neale Stadium; Moscow, ID (Little Brown Stein)	W 21–0	5,000	
November 15	at No. 10 California	California Memorial Stadium; Berkeley, CA	L 14–60	25,000	
November 29	Colorado A&M*	Dornblaser Field; Missoula, MT	W 41–7	5,000	
December 20	at Hawaii*	Honolulu Stadium; Honolulu, HI	W 14–12	5,000	
December 27	at Hawaii All-Stars*	Honolulu Stadium; Honolulu, HI	W 28–14		
*Non-conference game; Rankings from AP Poll released prior to the game
