= 1947 Stanford Indians football team =

American college football season

1947 Stanford Indians football
- Conference: Pacific Coast Conference
- Record: 0–9 (0–7 PCC)
- Head coach: Marchmont Schwartz (3rd season)
- Home stadium: Stanford Stadium

1947 Pacific Coast Conference football standings
	Conf.					Overall
Team	W		L		T	W		L		T
No. 8 USC $	6	–	0	–	0	7	–	2	–	1
No. 15 California	5	–	1	–	0	9	–	1	–	0
Oregon	5	–	1	–	0	7	–	3	–	0
UCLA	4	–	2	–	0	5	–	4	–	0
Montana	2	–	1	–	0	7	–	4	–	0
Oregon State	3	–	4	–	0	5	–	5	–	0
Washington	2	–	5	–	0	3	–	6	–	0
Washington State	2	–	5	–	0	3	–	7	–	0
Idaho	1	–	4	–	0	4	–	4	–	0
Stanford	0	–	7	–	0	0	–	9	–	0
$ – Conference champion; Rankings from AP Poll

The 1947 Stanford Indians football team was an American football team that represented Stanford University in the Pacific Coast Conference (PCC) during the 1947 college football season. In its third year under head coach Marchmont Schwartz, the team compiled a 0–9 record, finished last in the PCC, and was outscored by a total of 214 to 73.

The 1947 season was one of two winless season in the history of Stanford football (the other was the 1960 season).

Stanford was ranked at No. 70 (out of 500 college football teams) in the final Litkenhous Ratings for 1947.

The team played its home games at Stanford Stadium in Stanford, California.

== Schedule ==
Date	Opponent	Site	Result	Attendance	Source
September 27	Idaho	Stanford Stadium; Stanford, CA	L 16–19	15,000	
October 4	at Michigan*	Michigan Stadium; Ann Arbor, MI	L 13–49	66,100	
October 11	Santa Clara*	Stanford Stadium; Stanford, CA	L 7–13	25,000	
October 18	No. 19 UCLA	Stanford Stadium; Stanford, CA	L 6–39	25,000	
October 25	at Washington	Husky Stadium; Seattle, WA	L 0–25	32,000	
November 1	Oregon State	Stanford Stadium; Stanford, CA	L 7–13	9,000	
November 8	at No. 5 USC	Los Angeles Memorial Coliseum; Los Angeles, CA (rivalry)	L 0–14	59,749	
November 15	Oregon	Stanford Stadium; Stanford, CA	L 6–21	12,000	
November 22	No. 9 California	Stanford Stadium; Stanford, CA (Big Game)	L 18–21	82,000	
*Non-conference game; Rankings from AP Poll released prior to the game

== Players drafted by the NFL ==
Player	Position	Round	Pick	NFL club
George Quist	Back	2	13	Detroit Lions
Bob Anderson	Back	9	68	Washington Redskins
Pinky Phleger	Tackle	12	100	Los Angeles Rams
