= 1947 UCLA Bruins football team =

American college football season

1947 UCLA Bruins football
- Conference: Pacific Coast Conference
- Record: 5–4 (4–2 PCC)
- Head coach: Bert LaBrucherie (3rd season)
- Home stadium: Los Angeles Memorial Coliseum

1947 Pacific Coast Conference football standings
| | Conf. | | | | | Overall |
| Team | W | | L | | T | W | | L | | T |
|---|---|---|---|---|---|---|---|---|---|---|
| No. 8 USC $ | 6 | – | 0 | – | 0 | 7 | – | 2 | – | 1 |
| No. 15 California | 5 | – | 1 | – | 0 | 9 | – | 1 | – | 0 |
| Oregon | 5 | – | 1 | – | 0 | 7 | – | 3 | – | 0 |
| UCLA | 4 | – | 2 | – | 0 | 5 | – | 4 | – | 0 |
| Montana | 2 | – | 1 | – | 0 | 7 | – | 4 | – | 0 |
| Oregon State | 3 | – | 4 | – | 0 | 5 | – | 5 | – | 0 |
| Washington | 2 | – | 5 | – | 0 | 3 | – | 6 | – | 0 |
| Washington State | 2 | – | 5 | – | 0 | 3 | – | 7 | – | 0 |
| Idaho | 1 | – | 4 | – | 0 | 4 | – | 4 | – | 0 |
| Stanford | 0 | – | 7 | – | 0 | 0 | – | 9 | – | 0 |
$ – Conference champion; Rankings from AP Poll

The 1947 UCLA Bruins football team was an American football team that represented the University of California, Los Angeles in the Pacific Coast Conference (PCC) during the 1947 college football season. In their third year under head coach Bert LaBrucherie, the Bruins compiled a 5–4 record (4–2 in PCC, fourth). Home games were played at the Los Angeles Memorial Coliseum.

UCLA was ranked at No. 8 in the final Litkenhous Ratings for 1947.

== Schedule ==
| Date | Opponent | Rank | Site | Result | Attendance | Source |
|---|---|---|---|---|---|---|
| September 26 | Iowa* | | Los Angeles Memorial Coliseum; Los Angeles, CA | W 22–7 | 89,800 | |
| October 4 | at Northwestern* | | Dyche Stadium; Evanston, IL | L 26–27 | 44,000 | |
| October 11 | Oregon | | Los Angeles Memorial Coliseum; Los Angeles, CA | W 24–7 | 43,713 | |
| October 18 | at Stanford | No. 19 | Stanford Stadium; Stanford, CA | W 39–6 | 25,000 | |
| October 25 | No. 14 SMU* | No. 16 | Los Angeles Memorial Coliseum; Los Angeles, CA | L 0–7 | 64,197 | |
| November 1 | No. 14 California | No. 19 | Los Angeles Memorial Coliseum; Los Angeles, CA (rivalry) | L 0–6 | 80,266 | |
| November 8 | at Oregon State | | Multnomah Stadium; Portland, OR | W 27–7 | 30,870 | |
| November 15 | Washington | | Los Angeles Memorial Coliseum; Los Angeles, CA | W 34–7 | 43,777 | |
| November 22 | at No. 4 USC | No. 18 | Los Angeles Memorial Coliseum; Los Angeles, CA (Victory Bell) | L 0–6 | 102,050 | |
*Non-conference game; Rankings from AP Poll released prior to the game

== Rankings ==
Ranking movements Legend: ██ Increase in ranking ██ Decrease in ranking — = Not ranked
| | Week | | | | | | | | | |
| Poll | 1 | 2 | 3 | 4 | 5 | 6 | 7 | 8 | 9 | Final |
|---|---|---|---|---|---|---|---|---|---|---|
| AP | — | 19 | 16 | 19 | — | — | 18 | 17 | 19 | — |
