= 1947 California Golden Bears football team =

American college football season

1947 California Golden Bears football
- Conference: Pacific Coast Conference

Ranking
- AP: No. 15
- Record: 9–1 (5–1 PCC)
- Head coach: Pappy Waldorf (1st season)
- Offensive scheme: Single-wing
- Home stadium: California Memorial Stadium

1947 Pacific Coast Conference football standings
	Conf.					Overall
Team	W		L		T	W		L		T
No. 8 USC $	6	–	0	–	0	7	–	2	–	1
No. 15 California	5	–	1	–	0	9	–	1	–	0
Oregon	5	–	1	–	0	7	–	3	–	0
UCLA	4	–	2	–	0	5	–	4	–	0
Montana	2	–	1	–	0	7	–	4	–	0
Oregon State	3	–	4	–	0	5	–	5	–	0
Washington	2	–	5	–	0	3	–	6	–	0
Washington State	2	–	5	–	0	3	–	7	–	0
Idaho	1	–	4	–	0	4	–	4	–	0
Stanford	0	–	7	–	0	0	–	9	–	0
$ – Conference champion; Rankings from AP Poll

The 1947 California Golden Bears football team was an American football team that represented the University of California, Berkeley in the Pacific Coast Conference (PCC) during the 1947 college football season. Led by new head coach Pappy Waldorf, the Golden Bears compiled an overall record of 9–1 (5–1 in PCC, second}. Home games were played on campus at California Memorial Stadium in Berkeley, California.

Waldorf was previously the head coach at Northwestern for twelve seasons.

== Schedule ==
Date	Opponent	Rank	Site	Result	Attendance	Source
September 20	Santa Clara*		California Memorial Stadium; Berkeley, CA	W 33–7	40,000	
September 27	Navy*		California Memorial Stadium; Berkeley, CA	W 14–7	80,000	
October 4	Saint Mary's*		California Memorial Stadium; Berkeley, CA	W 45–6	78,000	
October 11	at Wisconsin*	No. 8	Camp Randall Stadium; Madison, WI	W 48–7	45,000	
October 18	Washington State	No. 4	California Memorial Stadium; Berkeley, CA	W 21–6	36,000	
October 25	No. 10 USC	No. 4	California Memorial Stadium; Berkeley, CA	L 14–39	81,659	
November 1	at No. 19 UCLA	No. 14	Los Angeles Memorial Coliseum; Los Angeles, CA (rivalry)	W 6–0	80,266	
November 8	Washington	No. 12	California Memorial Stadium; Berkeley, CA	W 13–7	50,000	
November 15	Montana	No. 10	California Memorial Stadium; Berkeley, CA	W 60–14	25,000	
November 22	at Stanford	No. 9	Stanford Stadium; Stanford, CA (Big Game)	W 21–18	82,000	
*Non-conference game; Rankings from AP Poll released prior to the game

== Rankings ==
Ranking movements Legend: ██ Increase in ranking ██ Decrease in ranking ( ) = First-place votes
	Week									
Poll	1	2	3	4	5	6	7	8	9	Final
AP	8 (1)	4	4 (1)	14	12	10	9	11	15	15
