= 1947 USC Trojans football team =

American college football season

1947 USC Trojans football

PCC champion

Rose Bowl, L 0–49 vs. Michigan
- Conference: Pacific Coast Conference

Ranking
- AP: No. 8
- Record: 7–2–1 (6–0 PCC)
- Head coach: Jeff Cravath (6th season)
- Home stadium: Los Angeles Memorial Coliseum

1947 Pacific Coast Conference football standings
	Conf.					Overall
Team	W		L		T	W		L		T
No. 8 USC $	6	–	0	–	0	7	–	2	–	1
No. 15 California	5	–	1	–	0	9	–	1	–	0
Oregon	5	–	1	–	0	7	–	3	–	0
UCLA	4	–	2	–	0	5	–	4	–	0
Montana	2	–	1	–	0	7	–	4	–	0
Oregon State	3	–	4	–	0	5	–	5	–	0
Washington	2	–	5	–	0	3	–	6	–	0
Washington State	2	–	5	–	0	3	–	7	–	0
Idaho	1	–	4	–	0	4	–	4	–	0
Stanford	0	–	7	–	0	0	–	9	–	0
$ – Conference champion; Rankings from AP Poll

The 1947 USC Trojans football team was an American football team that represented the University of Southern California (USC) as a member of the Pacific Coast Conference (PCC) during the 1947 college football season. In its sixth year under head coach Jeff Cravath, the team compiled a 7–2–1 record (6–0 against conference opponents), won the PCC championship, was ranked No. 8 in the final AP Poll, and outscored opponents by a total of 193 to 114. The team lost to Notre Dame in the final game of the regular season and to Michigan in the 1948 Rose Bowl on New Year's Day.

Four USC players received first-team honors on the 1947 All-Pacific Coast football teams selected by the PCC coaches, the Associated Press (AP), and the United Press (UP): end Paul Cleary (Coaches-1, AP-1, UP-1); tackle John Ferraro (Coaches-1, AP-1, UP-1); halfback Don Doll (Coaches-1, AP-1, UP-1); and tackle Bob Hendren (AP-1). Cleary and Ferraro were later inducted into the College Football Hall of Fame.

The team played its home games at the Los Angeles Memorial Coliseum.

== Schedule ==
Date	Opponent	Rank	Site	Result	Attendance	Source
September 27	Washington State		Los Angeles Memorial Coliseum; Los Angeles, CA	W 21–0	48,173	
October 4	Rice*		Los Angeles Memorial Coliseum; Los Angeles, CA	T 7–7	64,231	
October 11	at Ohio State*	No. 20	Ohio Stadium; Columbus, OH	W 32–0	76,559	
October 18	Oregon State	No. 11	Los Angeles Memorial Coliseum; Los Angeles, CA	W 48–6	61,301	
October 25	at No. 4 California	No. 10	California Memorial Stadium; Berkeley, CA	W 39–14	81,659	
November 1	at Washington	No. 5	Husky Stadium; Seattle, WA	W 19–0	32,000	
November 8	Stanford	No. 5	Los Angeles Memorial Coliseum; Los Angeles, CA (rivalry)	W 14–0	59,749	
November 22	No. 18 UCLA	No. 4	Los Angeles Memorial Coliseum; Los Angeles, CA (Victory Bell)	W 6–0	102,050	
December 6	No. 1 Notre Dame*^{†}	No. 3	Los Angeles Memorial Coliseum; Los Angeles, CA (rivalry)	L 7–38	104,953	
January 1, 1948	vs. No. 2 Michigan*	No. 8	Rose Bowl; Pasadena, CA (Rose Bowl)	L 0–49	93,000	
*Non-conference game; ^{†}Homecoming; Rankings from AP Poll released prior to the game

== Rankings ==
Ranking movements Legend: ██ Increase in ranking ██ Decrease in ranking ( ) = First-place votes
	Week									
Poll	1	2	3	4	5	6	7	8	9	Final
AP	20	11	10	5 (6)	5 (2)	5 (5)	4 (3)	4 (3)	3 (2)	8

== Coaching staff ==
- Head coach: Jeff Cravath
- Assistant coaches: Roy "Bullet" Baker, Roy Engle, Norm Verry (asst. line coach), Sam Barry (chief scout), Pete McPhail (ends), Raymond George (head line coach)
