= History of Texas Tech University =

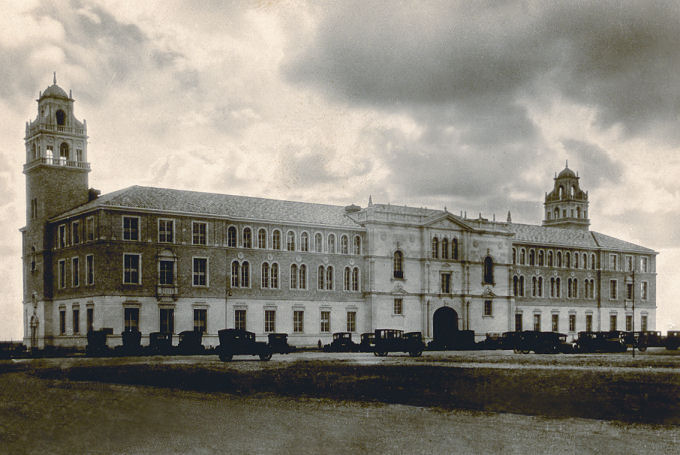
Administration Building (c. 1925)

The history of Texas Tech University dates back to the early 1880s, but the university was not established until 1923.

== Establishment ==
The call to open a college in West Texas began shortly after the arrival of settlers in the area in the 1880s. In 1917, the Texas legislature passed a bill creating a branch of Texas A&M to be located in Abilene. However, the bill was repealed two years later during the next session after it was discovered that Governor James E. Ferguson had falsely reported the site committee's choice of location. After new legislation passed in the state house and senate in 1921, Governor Pat Neff vetoed it, citing hard financial times in West Texas. Furious about Neff's veto, some in West Texas went so far as to recommend that West Texas secede from the state.

In 1923, the legislature decided that, rather than a branch campus, an entirely new university would better serve the needs of the region. On February 10, 1923, Neff signed the legislation creating Texas Technological College, and in July of that year a committee began searching for a site. When the members of the committee visited Lubbock, they were overwhelmed to find residents lining the streets to show support for the idea of hosting the institution. That August, Lubbock was chosen on the first ballot over other area towns, including Floydada, Plainview, and Sweetwater. On November 22, 1923, Paul Whitfield Horn was selected as its first president.

== Early years ==
Original Double T

Construction of the college campus began on November 1, 1924. Ten days later, the cornerstone of the Administration Building was laid in front of a crowd of twenty thousand people. Governor Pat Neff, Amon G. Carter, Reverend E. E. Robinson, Colonel Ernest O. Thompson, and Representative R. M. Chitwood spoke at the event. With an enrollment of 914 students—both men and women—Texas Technological College opened for classes on October 1, 1925. It was originally composed of four schools—Agriculture, Engineering, Home Economics, and Liberal Arts.

During the 1926 football season, head football coach, E. Y. Freeland, and assistant coach, Grady Higginbotham unveiled the first version of the Double T logo. It was first used on the football players sweaters for the inaugural season.

Texas Tech grew slowly in the early years. Military training was conducted at the college as early as 1925, but formal Reserve Officers' Training Corps training did not commence until 1936. By 1939, the school's enrollment had grown to 3,890. Though enrollment declined during World War II, Texas Tech trained 4,747 men in its armed forces training detachments. Following the war, in 1946, the college saw its enrollment leap to 5,366 from a low of 1,696 in 1943.

== Expansion and growth ==
By the 1960s, the school had expanded its offerings to more than just technical subjects. The Faculty Advisory Committee suggested changing the name to "Texas State University", feeling the phrase "Technological College" was insufficient to define the scope of the institution. While most students supported this change, the Board of Directors and many alumni, wanting to preserve the Double T logo, opposed it. Other names—University of the Southwest, Texas Technological College and State University, and The Texas University of Art, Science and Technology—were considered, but the Board of Directors chose Texas Tech University, submitting it to the state legislature in 1964. A failed move by Governor John Connally to have the school placed into the Texas A&M University System, as well as continued disagreement and heated debate regarding the school's new name, kept the name change from being approved. In spite of objections by many students and faculty, the Board of Directors again submitted the change in 1969. It finally received the legislature's approval on June 6 and the name Texas Tech University went into effect that September. All of the institution's existing schools, except Law, became colleges.

The university was integrated in the summer of 1961 when its first African-American student, Lucille S. Graves, was admitted. After its initial rejection of the students' enrollment and the threat of a subsequent lawsuit, the university enacted a policy to admit "all qualified applicants regardless of color". The university offered its first athletic scholarship to a black student in 1967, when Danny Hardaway was recruited to play for the Red Raiders football team. In 1970, Hortense W. Dixon became the first African-American student to earn a doctorate from the university. In 1972, Emory Grant Davis became the first full-time African American faculty member.

In the 1960s and 1970s, the university invested US$150 million in the campus to construct buildings for the library, foreign languages, social sciences, communications, philosophy, electrical and petroleum engineering, art, and architecture. Some other buildings were significantly expanded.

On May 29, 1969, the 61st Texas Legislature created the Texas Tech University School of Medicine. The Texas Legislature expanded the medical school charter in 1979, creating the Texas Tech University Health Sciences Center. TTUHSC, which is now part of the Texas Tech University System, includes Schools of Allied Health Sciences, Medicine, Nursing, Pharmacy, and the Graduate School of Biomedical Sciences. It has locations in four Texas cities in addition to the main campus in Lubbock.

== Recent history ==
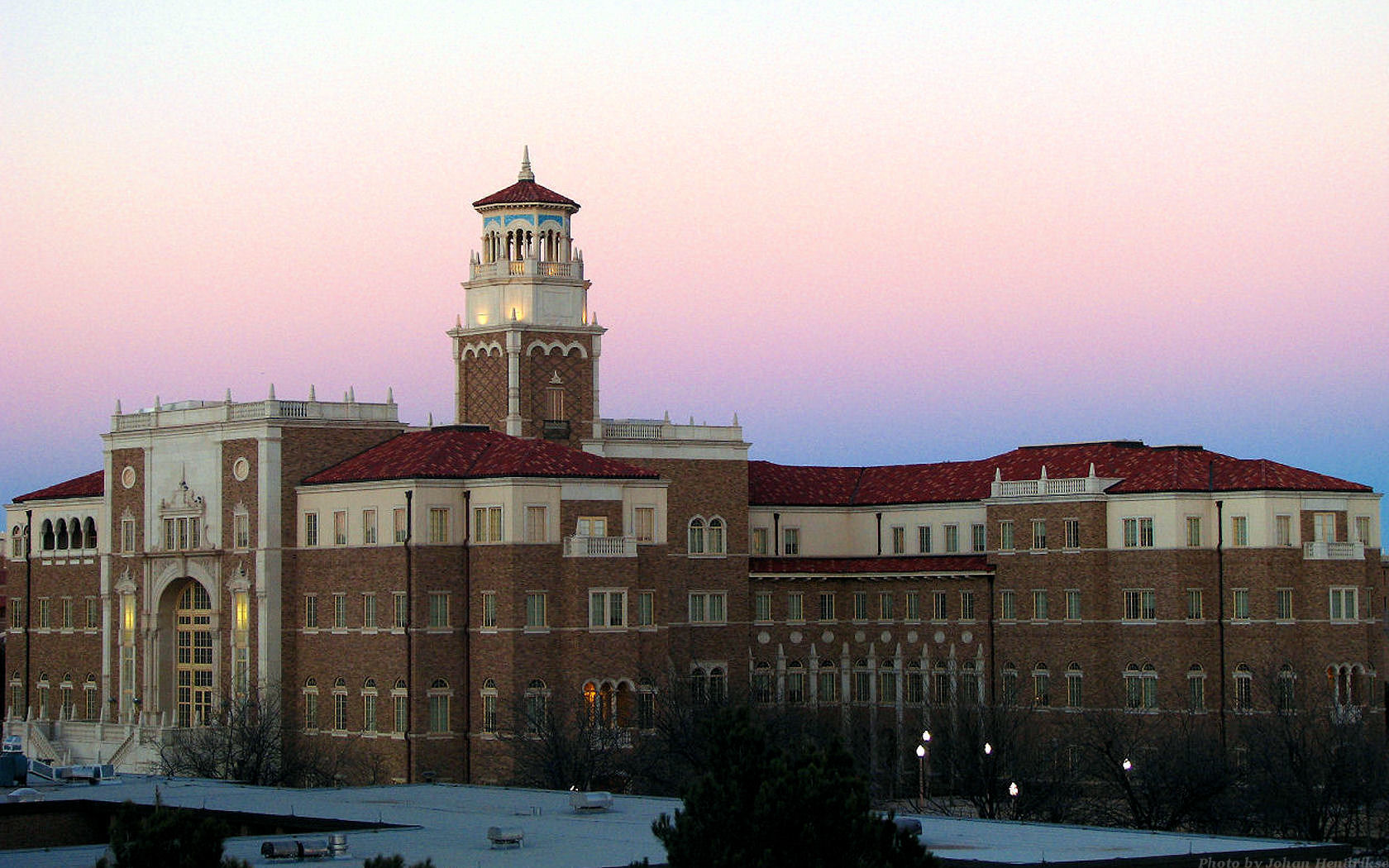
English and Philosophy Building

In 1996, the Texas Tech Board of Regents created the Texas Tech University System. John Montford was selected as the first chancellor to lead the combined academic enterprise. Regents Chair Edward Whitacre, Jr., stated that the move was made due to the size and complexity of the institution. "It's time", he said, "to take the university into the 21st century..." The Texas Tech University system originally included Texas Tech University and Texas Tech University Health Sciences Center. On November 6, 2007, the Texas Legislature ratified an amendment to the Texas Constitution re-aligning Angelo State University with the Texas Tech University System. Kent Hance, a former United States Congressman and Texas Tech University graduate, assumed the duties of chancellor on December 1, 2006.

To meet the demands of its increased enrollment and expanding research, the university has invested more than $548 million in new construction since 2000. It has also received more than $65.9 million in private donations. In April 2009, the Texas House of Representatives passed a bill to increase state funding for seven public universities. Texas Tech University is classified by the state as an "Emerging Research University" and is among the universities that received additional state funding for advancement toward "Tier 1" status. Three funds—the Research University Development Fund, the Texas Research Incentive Program, and the National Research University Benchmark Fund—provided $500 million in grants and matching funds during fiscal years 2010 and 2011. On September 2, 2009, the university announced that it had received private gifts totaling $24.3 million. Of these, $21.5 million were eligible for match under the Texas Research Incentive Program.

In late 2011 and throughout 2012–13, construction began on several new buildings on campus. The construction included a new $20 million Petroleum Engineering and Research building, a new building to house the Rawls College of Business, two new residence halls, a $3.5 million chapel, and extensive remodeling of the building that previously housed the Rawls College of Business. In 2024, Texas Tech cut the ribbon on a new $112.5 million, 130,000-square-foot Academic Sciences Building.

In 2016, longtime faculty member and university administrator Lawrence Schovanec was named the 17th president of Texas Tech University.

In 2023, Texas voters approved the creation of a new funding mechanism, the Texas University Fund. Its $3.9 billion endowment was created by combining a one-time grant from the state’s budget surplus with the National Research University Fund, interest income from the Economic Stabilization Fund, and charitable contributions. Four Texas universities, including Texas Tech, initially qualified to receive TUF funds based on their research expenditures and doctoral degrees awarded annually. Texas Tech received approximately $44 million for fiscal year 2024.
