= 1947 West Texas State Buffaloes football team =

American college football season

1947 West Texas State Buffaloes football
- Conference: Border Conference
- Record: 7–4 (5–2 Border)
- Head coach: Frank Kimbrough (1st season)
- Home stadium: Buffalo Stadium

1947 Border Conference football standings
	Conf.					Overall
Team	W		L		T	W		L		T
Texas Tech $	4	–	0	–	0	6	–	5	–	0
Hardin–Simmons	5	–	1	–	0	8	–	3	–	0
West Texas State	5	–	2	–	0	7	–	4	–	0
Arizona	3	–	2	–	0	5	–	4	–	1
Texas Mines	3	–	3	–	1	5	–	3	–	1
Arizona State	3	–	4	–	0	4	–	7	–	0
New Mexico	1	–	5	–	1	4	–	5	–	1
New Mexico A&M	1	–	4	–	0	3	–	6	–	0
Arizona State–Flagstaff	0	–	4	–	0	1	–	7	–	0
$ – Conference champion

The 1947 West Texas State Buffaloes football team was an American football team that represented West Texas State College (now known as West Texas A&M University) in the Border Conference during the 1947 college football season. In its first season under head coach Frank Kimbrough, the team compiled a 7–4 record (5–2 against conference opponents) and outscored opponents by a total of 253 to 125.

The team was led on offense by Cloyce Box who later played five seasons with the Detroit Lions. West Texas was ranked at No. 94 (out of 500 college football teams) in the final Litkenhous Ratings for 1947.

== Schedule ==
Date	Opponent	Site	Result	Attendance	Source
September 20	at Tulsa*	Skelly Stadium; Tulsa, OK	L 13–26	7,500	
September 27	at Abilene Christian*	Fair Park Stadium; Abilene, TX	L 7–13	5,000	
October 4	at Texas Tech	Jones Stadium; Lubbock, TX	L 13–21	11,000	
October 11	Texas Mines	Buffalo Stadium; Canyon, TX	W 14–0		
October 18	Hardin*^{†}	Buffalo Stadium; Canyon, TX	W 38–0		
October 24	at New Mexico A&M	Quesenberry Field; Las Cruces, NM	W 34–7		
November 1	at Arizona State–Flagstaff	Skidmore Field; Flagstaff, AZ	W 25–0		
November 7	Hardin–Simmons	Buffalo Stadium; Canyon, TX	L 6–27	6,500	
November 15	at Colorado College*	Washburn Field; Colorado Springs, CO	W 40–6		
November 22	Arizona State	Buffalo Stadium; Canyon, TX	W 28–18	2,500	
November 29	at New Mexico	Zimmerman Field; Albuquerque, NM	W 28–18	7,000	
*Non-conference game; ^{†}Homecoming
