= 1947 Abilene Christian Wildcats football team =

College Football Season

1947 Abilene Christian Wildcats football
- Conference: Texas Conference
- Record: 6–3 (3–2 Texas)
- Head coach: Tonto Coleman (3rd season)
- Home stadium: Fair Fark Stadium

1947 Texas Conference football standings
	Conf.					Overall
Team	W		L		T	W		L		T
McMurry +	4	–	1	–	0	7	–	3	–	1
Hardin +	4	–	1	–	0	7	–	4	–	0
Abilene Christian	3	–	2	–	0	6	–	3	–	0
Howard Payne	2	–	3	–	0	4	–	6	–	0
Austin	2	–	3	–	0	2	–	6	–	1
Southwestern (TX)	0	–	5	–	0	3	–	6	–	0
+ – Conference co-champions

The 1947 Abilene Christian Wildcats football team represented Abilene Christian College—now known as Abilene Christian University—as a member of the Texas Conference during the 1947 college football season. Led by third-year head coach Tonto Coleman, the Wildcats compiled an overall record of 6–3 record with a mark of 3–2 against conference opponents, placing third in the Texas Conference. The team played home games at Fair Fark Stadium in Abilene, Texas.

== Schedule ==
Date	Opponent	Site	Result	Attendance	Source
September 20	Southwest Texas State*	Fair Fark Stadium; Abilene, TX	W 19–13	3,500	
September 27	West Texas State*	Fair Fark Stadium; Abilene, TX	W 13–7	5,000	
October 4	Arizona State*	Goodwin Stadium; Tempe, AZ	W 13–7	10,000	
October 11	at Southwestern (TX)	Snyder Field; Georgetown, TX	W 14–0		
October 18	at Wichita*	Veterans Field; Wichita, KS	L 0–7		
October 25	vs. McMurry	Fair Fark Stadium; Abilene, TX	L 7–20		
November 8	at Hardin	Coyote Stadium; Wichita Falls, TX	W 28–0		
November 15	Austin	Fair Fark Stadium; Abilene, TX	W 41–7		
November 27	at Howard Payne	Lion Stadium; Brownwood, TX	L 7–35		
*Non-conference game
