= 1947 Arizona State Sun Devils football team =

American college football season

1947 Arizona State Sun Devils football
- Conference: Border Conference
- Record: 4–7 (3–4 Border)
- Head coach: Ed Doherty (1st season)
- Home stadium: Goodwin Stadium

1947 Border Conference football standings
| | Conf. | | | | | Overall |
| Team | W | | L | | T | W | | L | | T |
|---|---|---|---|---|---|---|---|---|---|---|
| Texas Tech $ | 4 | – | 0 | – | 0 | 6 | – | 5 | – | 0 |
| Hardin–Simmons | 5 | – | 1 | – | 0 | 8 | – | 3 | – | 0 |
| West Texas State | 5 | – | 2 | – | 0 | 7 | – | 4 | – | 0 |
| Arizona | 3 | – | 2 | – | 0 | 5 | – | 4 | – | 1 |
| Texas Mines | 3 | – | 3 | – | 1 | 5 | – | 3 | – | 1 |
| Arizona State | 3 | – | 4 | – | 0 | 4 | – | 7 | – | 0 |
| New Mexico | 1 | – | 5 | – | 1 | 4 | – | 5 | – | 1 |
| New Mexico A&M | 1 | – | 4 | – | 0 | 3 | – | 6 | – | 0 |
| Arizona State–Flagstaff | 0 | – | 4 | – | 0 | 1 | – | 7 | – | 0 |
$ – Conference champion

The 1947 Arizona State Sun Devils football team was an American football team that represented Arizona State College (later renamed Arizona State University) in the Border Conference during the 1947 college football season. In its first season under head coach Ed Doherty, the team compiled a 4–7 record (3–4 against Border opponents) and outscored opponents by a total of 234 to 168.

In the final Litkenhous Ratings released in mid-December, Arizona State was ranked at No. 158 out of 500 college football teams.

== Schedule ==
| Date | Opponent | Site | Result | Attendance | Source |
|---|---|---|---|---|---|
| September 20 | Cal Poly* | Goodwin Stadium; Tempe, AZ | W 33–6 | 9,000 | |
| September 27 | at New Mexico | Zimmerman Field; Albuquerque, NM | W 25–12 | | |
| October 4 | Abilene Christian* | Goodwin Stadium; Tempe, AZ | L 7–13 | 10,000 | |
| October 11 | at Pepperdine* | Sentinel Field; Inglewood, CA | L 6–27 | 10,249 | |
| October 18 | Arizona State–Flagstaff | Goodwin Stadium; Tempe, AZ | W 31–7 | | |
| November 1 | New Mexico A&M^{†} | Goodwin Stadium; Tempe, AZ | W 33–12 | 10,000 | |
| November 8 | at Texas Mines | Kidd Field; El Paso, TX | L 0–21 | 10,000 | |
| November 15 | Arizona | Goodwin Stadium; Tempe, AZ (rivalry) | L 13–26 | 15,000 | |
| November 22 | at West Texas State | Buffalo Stadium; Canyon, TX | L 7–35 | 2,500 | |
| November 29 | vs. Nevada* | Butcher Field; Las Vegas, NV | L 13–33 | 330 | |
| December 6 | Hardin-Simmons | Goodwin Stadium; Tempe, AZ | L 0–42 | | |
*Non-conference game; ^{†}Homecoming
