= 1948 Sun Bowl =

American college football game

| Miami Redskins | Texas Tech Red Raiders |
| (8–0–1) | (6–4) |
| Independent | Border Conference |
| 13 | 12 |
| Head coach: George Blackburn and Sid Gillman | Head coach: Dell Morgan |
| | 1 | 2 | 3 | 4 | Total |
|---|---|---|---|---|---|
| Miami | 6 | 0 | 0 | 7 | 13 |
| Texas Tech | 0 | 6 | 0 | 6 | 12 |
- Date: January 1, 1948
- Season: 1947
- Stadium: Kidd Field
- Location: El Paso, Texas
- Attendance: 18,000

The 1948 Sun Bowl matched the Texas Tech Red Raiders and the Miami (Ohio) Redskins.

== Background ==
Blackburn helped Gillman coach this game for a team that went undefeated and was champion of the Mid-American Conference. The team had four future coaches on their roster as players: Ara Parseghian (most famous for coaching Northwestern and Notre Dame), Paul Dietzel (who went on to coach LSU), and Hugh Hindman (who went on to be the Ohio State Athletic Director who fired Woody Hayes). This was their first and so far only Sun Bowl. Tech was going to their fourth bowl game in 10 years and going to their first Sun Bowl since 1938. Tech was champion of the Border Conference.

== Game summary ==
Ara Parseghian scored for Miami on a 1-yard touchdown run to give Miami a 6–0 lead early. Tech retaliated with a Jim Conley touchdown run to make it tied at halftime. After Bill Hoover blocked a Red Raider punt, Paul Shoults gave Miami the lead with his touchdown run. Jake Speelman made the extra point this time to make it 13–6. But Tech had one more fight in them, as Bernie Winkler returned an interception 21 yards for a touchdown, as Tech looked to tie the game on the extra point. But Ernie Plank blocked the extra point kick, as Miami held on to win the game and the MAC's second straight Sun Bowl win.

== Statistics ==
| Statistics | Texas Tech | Miami (Ohio) |
|---|---|---|
| First Downs | 5 | 21 |
| Total offense Yards | 277 | 414 |
| Rushing yards | 194 | 294 |
| Passes Attempted | 14 | 22 |
| Passes Completed | 5 | 11 |
| Passes Intercepted | 2 | 2 |
| Interception Return Yardage | 54 | 22 |
| Penalties-Yards | 6-50 | 9-65 |
| Punts-Average | 7-25.0 | 7-35.0 |
| Fumbles-Lost | 1-0 | 1-1 |

== Aftermath ==
Gillman left the RedHawks after this game and Blackburn took over as head coach for the 1948 season. But after a MAC championship season, he left for Gillman's Cincinnati squad. The next coach was Woody Hayes, who would lead them to the 1951 Salad Bowl before he left in 1950 for Ohio State. They would not reach another bowl game until 1962. Texas Tech would go to the Raisin Bowl the following year, the last one with Morgan as coach.
