= 1947 Iowa State Cyclones football team =

American college football season

1947 Iowa State Cyclones football
- Conference: Big Six Conference
- Record: 3–6 (1–4 Big 6)
- Head coach: Abe Stuber (1st season)
- Captains: Harley Rollinger; Vic Weber
- Home stadium: Clyde Williams Field

1947 Big Six Conference football standings
	Conf.					Overall
Team	W		L		T	W		L		T
No. 12 Kansas +	4	–	0	–	1	8	–	1	–	2
No. 16 Oklahoma +	4	–	0	–	1	7	–	2	–	1
Missouri	3	–	2	–	0	6	–	4	–	0
Nebraska	2	–	3	–	0	2	–	7	–	0
Iowa State	1	–	4	–	0	3	–	6	–	0
Kansas State	0	–	5	–	0	0	–	10	–	0
+ – Conference co-champions; Rankings from AP Poll

The 1947 Iowa State Cyclones football team represented Iowa State College of Agricultural and Mechanic Arts (later renamed Iowa State University) in the Big Six Conference during the 1947 college football season. In their first year under head coach Abe Stuber, the Cyclones compiled a 3–6 record (1–4 against conference opponents), finished in fifth place in the conference, and were outscored by opponents by a combined total of 141 to 111. They played their home games at Clyde Williams Field in Ames, Iowa.

The team's statistical leaders included Webb Halbert with 464 rushing yards, Ron Norman with 504 passing yards, Dean Laun with 246 receiving yards, and Harley Rollinger with 21 points (three field goals and 12 extra points). Webb Halbert was the only Iowa State player to be selected as a first-team all-conference player.

The team's regular starting lineup consisted of left end Dean Laun, left tackle Tom Southard, left guard Joe Brubaker, center Rod Rust, right guard Norman Anderson, right tackle Harley Rollinger, right end Bob Jensen, quarterback Don Ferguson, left halfback Webb Halbert, right halfback Vic Weber, and fullback Ray Klootwyk. Rollinger and Weber were the team captains.

Iowa State was ranked at No. 90 (out of 500 college football teams) in the final Litkenhous Ratings for 1947.

== Schedule ==
Date	Time	Opponent	Site	Result	Attendance	Source
September 20	2:00 pm	Iowa State Teachers*	Clyde Williams Field; Ames, IA	W 31–14	10,544	
September 27	2:00 pm	Colorado	Clyde Williams Field; Ames, IA	L 0–7	9,989	
October 4	2:00 pm	at Kansas	Memorial Stadium; Lawrence, KS	L 7–27	17,591	
October 11	2:00 pm	Nebraska	Clyde Williams Field; Ames, IA (rivalry)	L 7–14	13,590	
October 18	1:00 pm	at Michigan State*	Macklin Field; East Lansing, MI	L 0–20	25,377	
October 25	2:00 pm	Missouri^{†}	Clyde Williams Field; Ames, IA (rivalry)	L 7–26	14,763	
November 1	2:30 pm	at Oklahoma	Oklahoma Memorial Stadium; Norman, OK	L 9–27	26,473	
November 8	2:00 pm	at Drake*	Drake Stadium; Des Moines, IA	W 36–6	9,786	
November 15	2:00 pm	Kansas State	Clyde Williams Field; Ames, IA (rivalry)	W 14–0	5,791	
*Non-conference game; ^{†}Homecoming; All times are in Central time
