= 1947 Kansas State Wildcats football team =

American college football season

1947 Kansas State Wildcats football
- Conference: Big Six Conference
- Record: 0–10 (0–5 Big 6)
- Head coach: Sam Francis (1st season)
- Home stadium: Memorial Stadium

1947 Big Six Conference football standings
| | Conf. | | | | | Overall |
| Team | W | | L | | T | W | | L | | T |
|---|---|---|---|---|---|---|---|---|---|---|
| No. 12 Kansas + | 4 | – | 0 | – | 1 | 8 | – | 1 | – | 2 |
| No. 16 Oklahoma + | 4 | – | 0 | – | 1 | 7 | – | 2 | – | 1 |
| Missouri | 3 | – | 2 | – | 0 | 6 | – | 4 | – | 0 |
| Nebraska | 2 | – | 3 | – | 0 | 2 | – | 7 | – | 0 |
| Iowa State | 1 | – | 4 | – | 0 | 3 | – | 6 | – | 0 |
| Kansas State | 0 | – | 5 | – | 0 | 0 | – | 10 | – | 0 |
+ – Conference co-champions; Rankings from AP Poll

The 1947 Kansas State Wildcats football team was an American football team that represented Kansas State University in the Big Six Conference during the 1947 college football season. In its first and only season under head coach Sam Francis, the team compiled a 0–10 record (0–5 against conference opponents), finished last in the Big Six, and was outscored by a total of 283 to 71.

In the final Litkenhous Ratings released in mid-December, Kansas State was ranked at No. 149 out of 500 college football teams.

The team played its home games at Memorial Stadium in Manhattan, Kansas.

On September 20, 1947, Kansas State hosted the first night game held in a Big Six stadium.

== Schedule ==
| Date | Time | Opponent | Site | Result | Attendance | Source |
|---|---|---|---|---|---|---|
| September 20 | 8:30 p.m. | Oklahoma A&M* | Memorial Stadium; Manhattan, KS | L 0–12 | > 12,000 | |
| September 26 | | at Texas Mines* | Kidd Field; El Paso, TX | L 6–20 | 10,000 | |
| October 4 | 8:30 p.m. | New Mexico* | Ahearn Field; Manhattan, KS | L 18–20 | 10,000 | |
| October 10 | | at Boston College* | Braves Field; Boston, MA | L 13–49 | 21,457 | |
| October 18 | | at Missouri | Memorial Stadium; Columbia, MO | L 7–47 | 18,000 | |
| October 25 | | Nebraska^{†} | Memorial Stadium; Manhattan, KS (rivalry) | L 7–14 | 17,000 | |
| November 1 | | at Kansas | Memorial Stadium; Lawrence, KS (rivalry) | L 0–55 | 20,033 | |
| November 8 | | Oklahoma | Memorial Stadium; Manhattan, KS | L 13–27 | 8,000 | |
| November 15 | | at Iowa State | Clyde Williams Field; Ames, IA (rivalry) | L 0–14 | 8,000 | |
| November 29 | | at Florida* | Florida Field; Gainesville, FL | L 7–25 | 7,000 | |
*Non-conference game; ^{†}Homecoming; All times are in Central time
