= 1947 Cincinnati Bearcats football team =

American college football season

1947 Cincinnati Bearcats football

MAC champion
- Conference: Mid-American Conference
- Record: 7–3 (3–1 MAC)
- Head coach: Ray Nolting (3rd season)
- Home stadium: Nippert Stadium

1947 Mid-American Conference football standings
	Conf.					Overall
Team	W		L		T	W		L		T
Cincinnati $	3	–	1	–	0	7	–	3	–	0
Western Reserve	2	–	1	–	0	4	–	5	–	0
Butler	1	–	3	–	0	5	–	3	–	1
Ohio	1	–	3	–	0	3	–	5	–	1
Miami (OH) *	2	–	0	–	0	9	–	0	–	1
Western Michigan *	0	–	1	–	0	5	–	4	–	0
$ – Conference champion; * – Miami and Western Michigan were not eligible to compete for the MAC championship because they did not schedule a full slate of games against MAC opponents.

The 1947 Cincinnati Bearcats football team was an American football team that represented the University of Cincinnati as a member of the Mid-American Conference (MAC) during the 1947 college football season. In its third season under head coach Ray Nolting, the team compiled an overall record of 7–3 record with a mark of 3–1 against conference opponents, winning the MAC championship.

Cincinnati was ranked at No. 89 (out of 500 college football teams) in the final Litkenhous Ratings for 1947.

== Schedule ==
Date	Opponent	Site	Result	Attendance	Source
September 27	at Kentucky*	McLean Stadium; Lexington, KY	L 0–20	23,800	
October 4	St. Bonaventure*	Nippert Stadium; Cincinnati, OH	W 20–14	19,000	
October 11	Dayton*	Nippert Stadium; Cincinnati, OH	L 21–26	24,000	
October 18	Oklahoma City*	Nippert Stadium; Cincinnati, OH	W 20–13	18,000	
October 25	Xavier*	Nippert Stadium; Cincinnati, OH (rivalry)	W 27–25	30,000	
November 1	at Ohio	Peden Stadium; Athens, OH	W 34–0	10,000	
November 8	Miami (FL)*	Nippert Stadium; Cincinnati, OH	W 20–7	23,000	
November 15	at Western Reserve	League Park; Cleveland, OH	W 7–6	< 2,000	
November 22	Butler	Nippert Stadium; Cincinnati, OH	W 26–19	8,500	
November 27	Miami (OH)	Nippert Stadium; Cincinnati, OH (Victory Bell)	L 7–38	31,000	
*Non-conference game
