= 1947 New Mexico A&M Aggies football team =

American college football season

1947 New Mexico A&M Aggies football
- Conference: Border Conference
- Record: 3–6 (1–4 Border)
- Head coach: Raymond A. Curfman (2nd season)
- Home stadium: Quesenberry Field

1947 Border Conference football standings
	Conf.					Overall
Team	W		L		T	W		L		T
Texas Tech $	4	–	0	–	0	6	–	5	–	0
Hardin–Simmons	5	–	1	–	0	8	–	3	–	0
West Texas State	5	–	2	–	0	7	–	4	–	0
Arizona	3	–	2	–	0	5	–	4	–	1
Texas Mines	3	–	3	–	1	5	–	3	–	1
Arizona State	3	–	4	–	0	4	–	7	–	0
New Mexico	1	–	5	–	1	4	–	5	–	1
New Mexico A&M	1	–	4	–	0	3	–	6	–	0
Arizona State–Flagstaff	0	–	4	–	0	1	–	7	–	0
$ – Conference champion

The 1947 New Mexico A&M Aggies football team was an American football team that represented New Mexico College of Agriculture and Mechanical Arts (now known as New Mexico State University) as a member of the Border Conference during the 1947 college football season. In its second and final year under head coach Raymond A. Curfman, the team compiled a 3–6 record and was outscored by a total of 169 to 140. The team played home games at Quesenberry Field in Las Cruces, New Mexico.

In the final Litkenhous Ratings released in mid-December, New Mexico A&M was ranked No. 256 out of 500 college football teams.

== Schedule ==
Date	Opponent	Site	Result	Attendance	Source
September 19	McMurry*	Quesenberry Field; Las Cruces, NM	L 7–22	3,000	
September 26	at Colorado State–Greeley*	Greeley, CO	L 13–14		
October 3	New Mexico Teachers*	Quesenberry Field; Las Cruces, NM	W 48–0		
October 11	at New Mexico	Zimmerman Field; Albuquerque, NM (rivalry)	L 0–20	12,000	
October 17	Sul Ross*	Quesenberry Field; Las Cruces, NM	W 27–14	3,200	
October 24	West Texas State	Quesenberry Field; Las Cruces, NM	L 7–34		
November 1	at Arizona State	Goodwin Stadium; Tempe, AZ	L 12–33	10,000	
November 8	Arizona State–Flagstaff^{†}	Quesenberry Field; Las Cruces, NM	W 26–6		
November 22	at Texas Mines	Kidd Field; El Paso, TX (rivalry)	L 0–26	10,000	
*Non-conference game; ^{†}Homecoming
