= 1947 Hardin–Simmons Cowboys football team =

American college football season

1947 Hardin–Simmons Cowboys football

Harbor Bowl, W 53–0 vs. San Diego State
- Conference: Border Conference
- Record: 8–3 (5–1 Border)
- Head coach: Warren B. Woodson (4th season)
- Home stadium: Fair Park Stadium

1947 Border Conference football standings
	Conf.					Overall
Team	W		L		T	W		L		T
Texas Tech $	4	–	0	–	0	6	–	5	–	0
Hardin–Simmons	5	–	1	–	0	8	–	3	–	0
West Texas State	5	–	2	–	0	7	–	4	–	0
Arizona	3	–	2	–	0	5	–	4	–	1
Texas Mines	3	–	3	–	1	5	–	3	–	1
Arizona State	3	–	4	–	0	4	–	7	–	0
New Mexico	1	–	5	–	1	4	–	5	–	1
New Mexico A&M	1	–	4	–	0	3	–	6	–	0
Arizona State–Flagstaff	0	–	4	–	0	1	–	7	–	0
$ – Conference champion

The 1947 Hardin–Simmons Cowboys football team was an American football team that represented Hardin–Simmons University in the Border Conference during the 1947 college football season. In its fourth season under head coach Warren B. Woodson, the team compiled an 8–3 record (5–1 against conference opponents) and outscored all opponents by a total of 305 to 87. The team played its three home games at Fair Park Stadium in Abilene, Texas.

Wilton Davis led the nation in rushing yardage with 1,173 yards, not including an additional 236 yards gained in a 53-0 victory over San Diego State in the Harbor Bowl.

Hardin–Simmons was ranked at No. 56 (out of 500 college football teams) in the final Litkenhous Ratings for 1947.

== Schedule ==
Date	Opponent	Site	Result	Attendance	Source
September 20	at Trinity (TX)*	San Antonio, TX	W 39–0		
October 3	at San Jose State*	Spartan Stadium; San Jose, CA	L 12–19	13,500	
October 11	Arizona	Fair Park Stadium; Abilene, TX	W 35–7	6,500	
October 17	New Mexico	Fair Park Stadium; Abilene, TX	W 33–7		
October 25	at Mississippi State*	Scott Field; Starkville, MS	L 7–27	9,000	
November 1	vs. Houston*	Buccaneer Stadium; Corpus Christi, TX	W 33–7	10,000	
November 7	at West Texas State	Canyon, TX	W 27–6	6,500	
November 15	Texas Mines	Fair Park Stadium; Abilene, TX	W 18–0	7,500	
November 29	at Texas Tech	Jones Stadium; Lubbock, TX	L 6–14	20,000	
December 6	at Arizona State	Goodwin Stadium; Tempe, AZ	W 42–0		
January 1, 1948	at San Diego State	Balboa Stadium; San Diego, CA (Harbor Bowl)	W 53–0	11,000	
*Non-conference game
