= 1947 Arizona State–Flagstaff Lumberjacks football team =

American college football season

1947 Arizona State–Flagstaff Lumberjacks football
- Conference: Border Conference
- Record: 1–7 (0–4 Border)
- Head coach: Nick Ragus (1st season)
- Home stadium: Skidmore Field

1947 Border Conference football standings
	Conf.					Overall
Team	W		L		T	W		L		T
Texas Tech $	4	–	0	–	0	6	–	5	–	0
Hardin–Simmons	5	–	1	–	0	8	–	3	–	0
West Texas State	5	–	2	–	0	7	–	4	–	0
Arizona	3	–	2	–	0	5	–	4	–	1
Texas Mines	3	–	3	–	1	5	–	3	–	1
Arizona State	3	–	4	–	0	4	–	7	–	0
New Mexico	1	–	5	–	1	4	–	5	–	1
New Mexico A&M	1	–	4	–	0	3	–	6	–	0
Arizona State–Flagstaff	0	–	4	–	0	1	–	7	–	0
$ – Conference champion

The 1947 Arizona State–Flagstaff Lumberjacks football team was an American football team that represented Arizona State College at Flagstaff (now known as Northern Arizona University) in the Border Conference during the 1947 college football season. In its first year under head coach Nick Ragus, the team compiled a 1–7 record (0–4 against conference opponents) and was outscored by a total of 295 to 39. The team played its three home games at Skidmore Field in Flagstaff, Arizona.

In the final Litkenhous Ratings released in mid-December, Arizona State-Flagstaff was ranked at No. 477 out of 500 college football teams.

== Schedule ==
Date	Opponent	Site	Result	Attendance	Source
September 20	at Nevada*	Mackay Stadium; Reno, NV	L 0–50	5,500	
September 27	Pepperdine*	Skidmore Field; Flagstaff, AZ	L 7–60		
October 4	at Texas Mines	Kidd Field; El Paso, TX	L 0–40		
October 11	Western State (CO)*^{†}	Skidmore Field; Flagstaff, AZ	W 12–8		
October 18	at Arizona State	Goodwin Stadium; Tempe, AZ	L 7–31		
October 25	at Wichita*	Cessna Stadium; Wichita, KS	L 7–55		
November 1	West Texas State	Skidmore Field; Flagstaff, AZ	L 0–25		
November 8	at New Mexico A&M	Quesenberry Field; Las Cruces, NM	L 6–26		
*Non-conference game; ^{†}Homecoming
