= 1947 Oklahoma Sooners football team =

American college football season

1947 Oklahoma Sooners football

Big 6 co-champion
- Conference: Big Six Conference

Ranking
- AP: No. 16
- Record: 7–2–1 (4–0–1 Big 6)
- Head coach: Bud Wilkinson (1st season)
- Captains: Jim Tyree; Wade Walker
- Home stadium: Memorial Stadium

1947 Big Six Conference football standings
	Conf.					Overall
Team	W		L		T	W		L		T
No. 12 Kansas +	4	–	0	–	1	8	–	1	–	2
No. 16 Oklahoma +	4	–	0	–	1	7	–	2	–	1
Missouri	3	–	2	–	0	6	–	4	–	0
Nebraska	2	–	3	–	0	2	–	7	–	0
Iowa State	1	–	4	–	0	3	–	6	–	0
Kansas State	0	–	5	–	0	0	–	10	–	0
+ – Conference co-champions; Rankings from AP Poll

The 1947 Oklahoma Sooners football team represented the University of Oklahoma in the 1947 college football season. In their first year under head coach Bud Wilkinson, the Sooners compiled a 7–2–1 record (4–0–1 against conference opponents), finished in a tie for first place in the Big Six Conference championship, and outscored their opponents by a combined total of 194 to 161.

Guard Buddy Burris received All-America honors in 1947, and five Sooners received all-conference honors: Burris, Jack Mitchell (back), John Rapacz (center), Jim Tyree (end), and Wade Walker (tackle).

Oklahoma was ranked at No. 39 (out of 500 college football teams) in the final Litkenhous Ratings for 1947.

== Schedule ==
Date	Opponent	Rank	Site	Result	Attendance	Source
September 27	at Detroit*		Navin Field; Detroit, MI	W 24–20	24,375	
October 4	Texas A&M*		Memorial Stadium; Norman, OK	W 26–14	32,500	
October 11	vs. No. 3 Texas*	No. 15	Fair Park Stadium; Dallas, TX (Red River Shootout)	L 14–34	46,000	
October 18	Kansas		Memorial Stadium; Norman, OK	T 13–13	34,700	
October 25	TCU*		Memorial Stadium; Norman, OK	L 7–20	23,000	
November 1	Iowa State^{†}		Memorial Stadium; Norman, OK	W 27–9	23,000	
November 8	at Kansas State		Memorial Stadium; Manhattan, KS	W 27–13	8,000	
November 15	at No. 17 Missouri		Memorial Stadium; Columbia, MO (rivalry)	W 21–12	28,500	
November 22	at Nebraska		Memorial Stadium; Lincoln, NE (rivalry)	W 14–13	28,000	
November 29	Oklahoma A&M*	No. 20	Memorial Stadium; Norman, OK (Bedlam)	W 21–13	32,000	
*Non-conference game; ^{†}Homecoming; Rankings from AP Poll released prior to the game

== Rankings ==
Ranking movements Legend: ██ Increase in ranking ██ Decrease in ranking — = Not ranked ( ) = First-place votes
	Week									
Poll	1	2	3	4	5	6	7	8	9	Final
AP	15	—	—	—	—	—	—	20	18	16 (1)

== Roster ==
- QB Darrell Royal, So.

== After the season ==
=== All-conference ===
All-Big Six
Player	Position	Selectors
Jack Mitchell	Back	UP-1
Wade Walker	Tackle	UP-1
Paul Burris	Guard	UP-1
John Rapacz	Center	UP-1

=== NFL draft ===
The following players were drafted into the National Football League following the season.

Round	Pick	Player	Position	NFL team
17	149	Nute Trotter	Tackle	Boston Yanks
18	158	Ray Pearcy	Center	Washington Redskins
