= Double T =

Logo of Texas Tech University

The Double T is a logo that is the most readily identified symbol of Texas Tech University.

== History ==
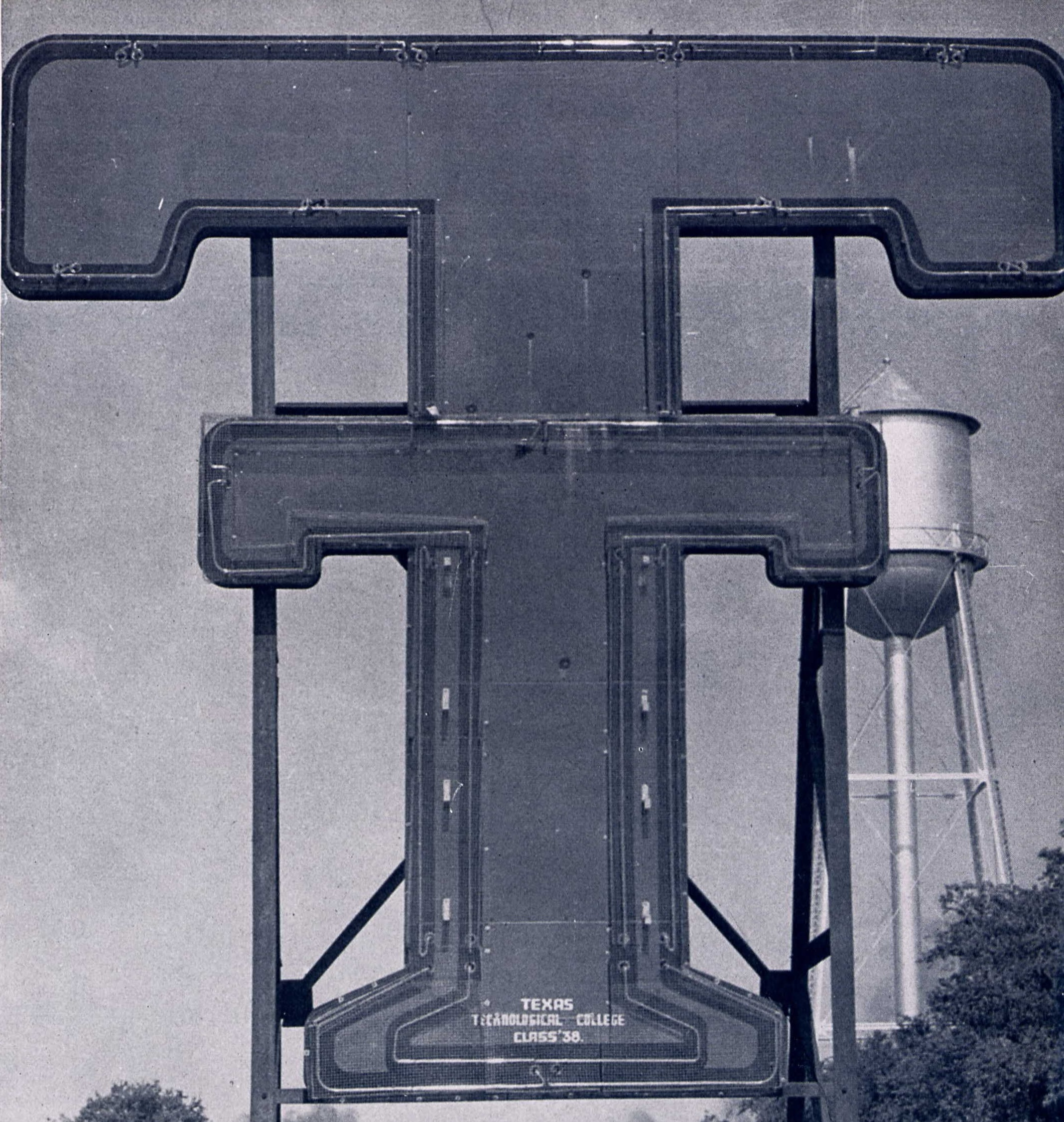
Neon Double T sign in 1948

The Double T is generally attributed to Texas Tech University's, then Texas Technological College, first football coach, E. Y. Freeland, and assistant coach, Grady Higginbotham. The Double T's design draws upon the popular block T of the Texas A&M University logo, Higginbotham's alma mater. It was first used as decoration on the sweaters for the football players during the college's 1926 football season.

The Double T became the official logo of the school in 1963.

By the 1960s, the school had expanded its offerings to more than just technical subjects. Feeling the phrase "Technological College" was insufficient to define the scope of the institution, Faculty Advisory Committee considered changing the name to "University of the Southwest", "Texas Technological College and State University", and "The Texas University of Art, Science and Technology" before recommending "Texas State University". While most students supported this change, the board of directors and many alumni, wanting to preserve the Double T logo, opposed it. The Board of Directors chose Texas Tech University, preserving the Double T, and submitted the name change to the state legislature in 1964. A failed move by Governor John Connally to have the school placed into the Texas A&M University System, as well as continued disagreement and heated debate regarding the school's new name, kept the name change from being approved until the Board of Directors again submitted the change in 1969. It finally received the legislature's approval on June 6 and the name Texas Tech University went into effect that September, preserving the Double T logo.

The Double T existed in several variations of original form until 1999, when an updated version of the logo was created. This version maintains the original premise, but incorporates three-dimensional bevelling effects paired with a white trim.

In 2025, the Texas Tech athletic department introduced a modernized version of the original non-beveled Double T that would begin use during the 2026–27 academic year. However, other departments within the university will continue to use the beveled, three-dimensional Double T introduced in 1999. Reactions to the change were mixed, with current Texas Tech students noting this version did not look as modern, including some calling the logo plain, while fans and alumni appreciated the throwback–like elements incorporated from the original version.

== Usage ==
To recognize the importance of the Double T, the class of 1931 donated the Double T bench. Per tradition, freshmen are not allowed to sit on the bench, which is located in the courtyard of the Administration Building.

The logo is further embodied in the Double T neon sign, donated by the class of 1938 and affixed to the east side of Galaxy Stadium. At the time of its purchase, this was reputedly the largest neon sign in existence.

In August 1987, a second neon Double T was added to the west side of the stadium, funded by Bill McMillan. It was replaced by a stained glass Double T after renovations to the stadium's west side in 2003.

== Gallery ==
1925–1999
Original version of the Double T

1999–present
Beveled version used by the athletic department until 2026 and continues to be used by other units of Texas Tech University.

2026–present
Modernized Double T logo used by the athletic department
