= 1947 Ohio Bobcats football team =

American college football season

1947 Ohio Bobcats football
- Conference: Mid-American Conference
- Record: 3–5–1 (1–3 MAC)
- Head coach: Harold Wise (1st season)
- Home stadium: Peden Stadium

1947 Mid-American Conference football standings
	Conf.					Overall
Team	W		L		T	W		L		T
Cincinnati $	3	–	1	–	0	7	–	3	–	0
Western Reserve	2	–	1	–	0	4	–	5	–	0
Butler	1	–	3	–	0	5	–	3	–	1
Ohio	1	–	3	–	0	3	–	5	–	1
Miami (OH) *	2	–	0	–	0	9	–	0	–	1
Western Michigan *	0	–	1	–	0	5	–	4	–	0
$ – Conference champion; * – Miami and Western Michigan were not eligible to compete for the MAC championship because they did not schedule a full slate of games against MAC opponents.

The 1947 Ohio Bobcats football team was an American football team that represented Ohio University in the Mid-American Conference (MAC) during the 1947 college football season. In their first season under head coach Harold Wise, the Bobcats compiled a 3–5–1 record (1–3 against MAC opponents), finished in fourth place in the MAC, and were outscored by all opponents by a combined total of 116 to 80. Offensive guard Ed Zednik was selected as a first-team All-MAC player. They played their home games in Peden Stadium in Athens, Ohio.

In the final Litkenhous Ratings released in mid-December, Ohio was ranked at No. 157 out of 500 college football teams.

== Schedule ==
Date	Opponent	Site	Result	Attendance	Source
September 27	Ohio Northern*	Peden Stadium; Athens, OH	W 34–0		
October 4	Butler	Peden Stadium; Athens, OH	W 14–7		
October 11	at Western Reserve	League Park; Cleveland, OH	L 7–20	7,700	
October 18	at Bowling Green*	Bowling Green, OH	L 0–2		
October 25	at Miami (OH)^{†}	Miami Field; Oxford, OH (rivalry)	L 0–21	13,000	
November 1	Cincinnati	Peden Stadium; Athens, OH	L 0–34	10,000	
November 8	Ohio Wesleyan*	Peden Stadium; Athens, OH	T 7–7		
November 15	Dayton*	Peden Stadium; Athens, OH	L 6–8	6,000	
November 22	Xavier*	Peden Stadium; Athens, OH	W 12–7		
*Non-conference game; ^{†}Homecoming
