= 1947 Miami Redskins football team =

American college football season

1947 Miami Redskins football

Sun Bowl, W 13–12 vs. Texas Tech
- Conference: Mid-American Conference
- Record: 9–0–1 (2–0 MAC)
- Head coach: Sid Gillman (4th season)
- Captain: Bill Hoover
- Home stadium: Miami Field

1947 Mid-American Conference football standings
	Conf.					Overall
Team	W		L		T	W		L		T
Cincinnati $	3	–	1	–	0	7	–	3	–	0
Western Reserve	2	–	1	–	0	4	–	5	–	0
Butler	1	–	3	–	0	5	–	3	–	1
Ohio	1	–	3	–	0	3	–	5	–	1
Miami (OH) *	2	–	0	–	0	9	–	0	–	1
Western Michigan *	0	–	1	–	0	5	–	4	–	0
$ – Conference champion; * – Miami and Western Michigan were not eligible to compete for the MAC championship because they did not schedule a full slate of games against MAC opponents.

The 1947 Miami Redskins football team was an American football team that represented Miami University during the 1947 college football season. In their fourth and final season under head coach Sid Gillman, the Redskins compiled a 9–0–1 record, outscored all opponents by a combined total of 240 to 97, and defeated Texas Tech, 13–12, in the 1948 Sun Bowl.

Miami University and Western Michigan College were admitted to the MAC in July 1947. Wayne University then resigned from the conference in protest over the admission of schools not located in urban centers. Because Miami and Western Michigan did not schedule a full slate of games against MAC opponents in 1947, they were not eligible to compete for the conference championship.

Miami was ranked at No. 71 (out of 500 college football teams) in the final Litkenhous Ratings for 1947.

== Schedule ==
Date	Opponent	Site	Result	Attendance	Source
September 27	Murray State*	Miami Field; Oxford, OH	W 28–12	9,300	
October 4	vs. Kent State*	Akron, OH	W 35–7	14,118	
October 11	Bowling Green*	Miami Field; Oxford, OH	W 33–19	9,000	
October 18	at Xavier*	Xavier Stadium; Cincinnati, OH	T 6–6	13,000	
October 21	Ohio	Miami Field; Oxford, OH (rivalry)	W 21–0	13,000	
November 1	at Bradley*	Peoria, IL	W 32–27		
November 8	Dayton*	Miami Field; Oxford, OH	W 12–0	11,421	
November 15	at Wichita*	Cessna Stadium; Wichita, KS	W 22–7	9,000	
November 27	at Cincinnati	Nippert Stadium; Cincinnati, OH (Victory Bell)	W 38–7	23,000	
January 1, 1948	vs. Texas Tech*	Kidd Field; El Paso, TX (Sun Bowl)	W 13–12	15,000	
*Non-conference game
