= Nick Ragus (coach) =

American football and basketball coach (1908–1981)

Biographical details
- Born: 1908; Globe, Arizona, U.S.
- Died: April 12, 1981 (aged 72–73); Globe, Arizona, U.S.

Playing career

Football
- c. 1930: Saint Mary's

Coaching career (HC unless noted)

Football
- 1947–1948: Arizona State–Flagstaff

Basketball
- 1947–1949: Arizona State–Flagstaff

Head coaching record
- Overall: 5–12 (football); 24–18 (basketball)

Nicholas C. Ragus (1908 – April 12, 1981) was an American football and basketball coach. He served as the head football coach at Arizona State Teachers College at Flagstaff—now known as Northern Arizona University—from 1947 to 1948, compiling a record of 5–12. Ragus was also the school's head basketball coach from 1947 to 1949, tallying a mark of 24–18. He previously served as a head coach at a number of high schools in Arizona, including Miami High School in Miami, Arizona.

Ragus played college football at Saint Mary's College of California.

== Head coaching record ==
=== Football ===
| Year | Team | Overall | Conference | Standing | Bowl/playoffs |
|---|---|---|---|---|---|
Arizona State Flagstaff–Lumberjacks (Border Conference) (1947–1948)
| 1947 | Arizona State–Flagstaff | 1–7 | 0–4 | 9th | |
| 1948 | Arizona State–Flagstaff | 4–5 | 1–2 | 7th | |
| Arizona State–Flagstaff: | | 5–12 | 1–6 | | |
| Total: | | 5–12 | | | |
