= 1947 Western Michigan Broncos football team =

American college football season

1947 Western Michigan Broncos football
- Conference: Mid-American Conference
- Record: 5–4 (0–1 MAC)
- Head coach: John Gill (6th season)
- MVP: Emerson Grossman
- Captain: Al Bush
- Home stadium: Waldo Stadium

1947 Mid-American Conference football standings
	Conf.					Overall
Team	W		L		T	W		L		T
Cincinnati $	3	–	1	–	0	7	–	3	–	0
Western Reserve	2	–	1	–	0	4	–	5	–	0
Butler	1	–	3	–	0	5	–	3	–	1
Ohio	1	–	3	–	0	3	–	5	–	1
Miami (OH) *	2	–	0	–	0	9	–	0	–	1
Western Michigan *	0	–	1	–	0	5	–	4	–	0
$ – Conference champion; * – Miami and Western Michigan were not eligible to compete for the MAC championship because they did not schedule a full slate of games against MAC opponents.

The 1947 Western Michigan Broncos football team represented Michigan College of Education (later renamed Western Michigan University) as a member of the Mid-American Conference during the 1947 college football season. In its sixth season under head coach John Gill, the team compiled a 6–3 record (0–1 against MAC opponents) and was outscored by a total of 147 to 139. The team played its home games at Waldo Stadium in Kalamazoo, Michigan.

Halfback Al Bush was the team captain. Guard Emerson Grossman received the team's most outstanding player award.

In the final Litkenhous Ratings released in mid-December, Western Michigan was ranked at No. 137 out of 500 college football teams.

Western Michigan and Miami University were admitted to the MAC in July 1947. Wayne University then resigned from the conference in protest over the admission of schools not located in urban centers.

== Schedule ==
Date	Opponent	Site	Result	Attendance	Source
September 26	at Xavier*	Xavier Stadium; Cincinnati, OH	L 0–19	11,000	
October 4	Washington University*	Waldo Stadium; Kalamazoo, MI	W 14–6	7,000	
October 11	at Central Michigan*	Alumni Field; Mount Pleasant, MI (rivalry)	W 20–12		
October 18	Iowa State Teachers*	Waldo Stadium; Kalamazoo, MI	W 14–0		
October 25	at Butler	Butler Bowl; Indianapolis, IN	L 20–21	10,000	
November 1	Western Kentucky State Teachers*	Waldo Stadium; Kalamazoo, MI	W 38–0		
November 8	at No. 11 Illinois*	Memorial Stadium; Champaign, IL	L 14–60	24,012	
November 15	Beloit*	Waldo Stadium; Kalamazoo, MI	W 12–0		
November 27	at Oklahoma City*	Taft Stadium; Oklahoma City, OK	L 7–35	6,000	
*Non-conference game; Rankings from Coaches' Poll released prior to the game
