= 1947 Texas Mines Miners football team =

American college football season

1947 Texas Mines Miners football
- Conference: Border Conference
- Record: 5–3–1 (3–3–1 Border)
- Head coach: Jack Curtice (2nd season)
- Home stadium: Kidd Field

1947 Border Conference football standings
	Conf.					Overall
Team	W		L		T	W		L		T
Texas Tech $	4	–	0	–	0	6	–	5	–	0
Hardin–Simmons	5	–	1	–	0	8	–	3	–	0
West Texas State	5	–	2	–	0	7	–	4	–	0
Arizona	3	–	2	–	0	5	–	4	–	1
Texas Mines	3	–	3	–	1	5	–	3	–	1
Arizona State	3	–	4	–	0	4	–	7	–	0
New Mexico	1	–	5	–	1	4	–	5	–	1
New Mexico A&M	1	–	4	–	0	3	–	6	–	0
Arizona State–Flagstaff	0	–	4	–	0	1	–	7	–	0
$ – Conference champion

The 1947 Texas Mines Miners football team was an American football team that represented the Texas School of Mines (now known as the University of Texas at El Paso) as a member of the Border Conference during the 1947 college football season. In its second season under head coach Jack Curtice, the team compiled a 5–3–1 record (3–3–1 against Border Conference opponents), finished fifth in the conference, and outscored opponents by a total of 159 to 79.

Texas Mines was ranked at No. 103 (out of 500 college football teams) in the final Litkenhous Ratings for 1947.

== Schedule ==
Date	Opponent	Site	Result	Attendance	Source
September 19	at Drake*	Drake Stadium; Des Moines, IA	W 19–7	9,000	
September 26	Kansas State*	Kidd Field; El Paso, TX	W 20–6		
October 4	Arizona State–Flagstaff	Kidd Field; El Paso, TX	W 40–0		
October 11	at West Texas State	Buffalo Stadium; Canyon, TX	L 0–14		
October 18	Arizona	Kidd Field; El Paso, TX	L 13–14	12,000	
November 1	New Mexico	Kidd Field; El Paso, TX	T 20–20	11,000	
November 8	Arizona State	Kidd Field; El Paso, TX	W 21–0	10,000	
November 15	at Hardin–Simmons	Fair Park Stadium; Abilene, TX	L 0–18	7,500	
November 22	New Mexico A&M^{†}	Kidd Field; El Paso, TX (rivalry)	W 26–0	10,000	
*Non-conference game; ^{†}Homecoming
