= 1947 New Mexico Lobos football team =

American college football season

1947 New Mexico Lobos football
- Conference: Border Conference
- Record: 4–5–1 (1–5–1 Border)
- Head coach: Berl Huffman (1st season)
- Home stadium: Zimmerman Field

1947 Border Conference football standings
	Conf.					Overall
Team	W		L		T	W		L		T
Texas Tech $	4	–	0	–	0	6	–	5	–	0
Hardin–Simmons	5	–	1	–	0	8	–	3	–	0
West Texas State	5	–	2	–	0	7	–	4	–	0
Arizona	3	–	2	–	0	5	–	4	–	1
Texas Mines	3	–	3	–	1	5	–	3	–	1
Arizona State	3	–	4	–	0	4	–	7	–	0
New Mexico	1	–	5	–	1	4	–	5	–	1
New Mexico A&M	1	–	4	–	0	3	–	6	–	0
Arizona State–Flagstaff	0	–	4	–	0	1	–	7	–	0
$ – Conference champion

The 1947 New Mexico Lobos football team represented the University of New Mexico in the Border Conference during the 1947 college football season. In their first season under head coach Berl Huffman, the Lobos compiled a 4–5–1 record (1–5–1 against conference opponents), finished seventh in the Border Conference, and were outscored by opponents by a total of 182 to 171.

Berl Huffman was hired as the head football coach in March 1947. He had been an assistant coach at Texas Tech since 1935.

In the final Litkenhous Ratings released in mid-December, New Mexico was ranked at No. 126 out of 500 college football teams.

== Schedule ==
Date	Opponent	Site	Result	Attendance	Source
September 27	Arizona State	Zimmerman Field; Albuquerque, NM	L 12–25		
October 4	at Kansas State*	Ahearn Field; Manhattan, KS	W 20–18	10,000	
October 11	New Mexico A&M	Zimmerman Field; Albuquerque, NM (rivalry)	W 20–0	12,000	
October 17	at Hardin–Simmons	Fair Park Stadium; Abilene, TX	L 7–33		
October 25	at Arizona	Varsity Stadium; Tucson, AZ (rivalry)	L 12–22	15,000	
November 1	at Texas Mines	Kidd Field; El Paso, TX	T 20–20	11,000	
November 8	Fresno State*	Zimmerman Field; Albuquerque, NM	W 34–3	7,000	
November 15	Drake*	Zimmerman Field; Albuquerque, NM	W 8–7	7,000	
November 22	Texas Tech^{†}	Zimmerman Field; Albuquerque, NM	L 20–26	10,000	
November 29	West Texas State	Zimmerman Field; Albuquerque, NM	L 18–28	7,000	
*Non-conference game; ^{†}Homecoming
