= Tonto Coleman =

American football coach and administrator (1907–1973)

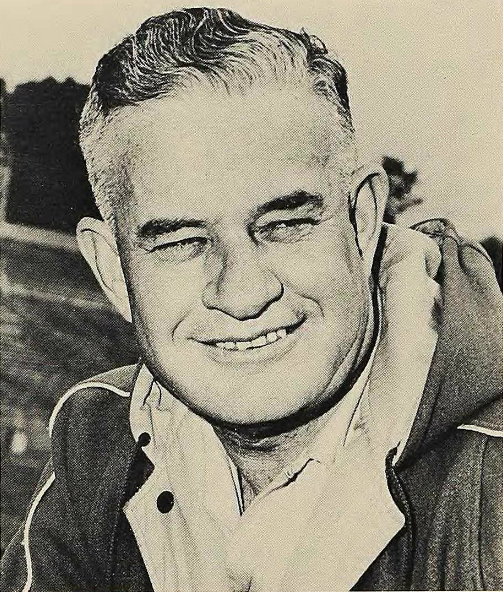
- Coleman pictured in Prickly Pear 1949, Abilene Christian yearbook

Biographical details
- Born: July 7, 1907; Phil Campbell, Alabama, U.S.
- Died: October 18, 1973 (aged 66); Abilene, Texas, U.S.

Playing career
- 1925–1928: Abilene Christian

Coaching career (HC unless noted)
- 1942–1949: Abilene Christian
- 1950–1951: Florida (assistant)
- 1952–1965: Georgia Tech (assistant)

Administrative career (AD unless noted)
- 1966–1972: SEC (commissioner)

Head coaching record
- Overall: 28–15–2

Accomplishments and honors

Championships
- 1 Texas Conference (1946)

Arthur Marvin "Tonto" 'Coleman (July 7, 1907 – October 18, 1973) was an American football coach and college athletics administrator. He served as the head football coach at Abilene Christian University from 1942 to 1949, compiling a record of 28–15–2. After working as an assistant football coach at the University of Florida and the Georgia Institute of Technology, Coleman was appointed the commission of the Southeastern Conference (SEC) in 1966, a position he filled until 1972.

== Early life and education ==
Coleman was born in Phil Campbell, Alabama, but moved to Texas with his family when he was 12 years old. After graduating from high school, he attended Abilene Christian University in Abilene, Texas, where he was a varsity letterman in three sports—football, basketball and baseball. Coleman graduated from Abilene Christian with a Bachelor of Arts degree in English in 1928, and subsequently earned a master's degree in post-secondary education in 1949. He served in the U.S. Army Air Force during World War II.

== Coaching career ==
Coleman was the sixth head football coach at Abilene Christian University serving for five seasons, from 1942 to 1949 with a three-year interruption during World War II, and compiling a record of 28–15–2.

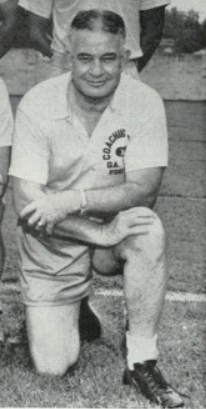
Coleman as a member of the Georgia Tech coaching staff, c. 1956

In 1950, Florida Gators football head coach Bob Woodruff recruited Coleman to be his assistant at the University of Florida in Gainesville, Florida. Georgia Tech Yellow Jackets football head coach Bobby Dodd subsequently invited him to become part of the Georgia Tech coaching staff in Atlanta, Georgia. While coaching at Georgia Tech, he also was the assistant athletic director and the coach of Georgia Tech's freshmen football team.

== SEC commissioner ==
Coleman became the fourth commissioner of the Southeastern Conference (SEC) in 1966, serving until 1972.

== Death ==
Coleman died of a heart attack on October 18, 1973, at his home in Abilene, Texas.

== Head coaching record ==
Year	Team	Overall	Conference	Standing	Bowl/playoffs
Abilene Christian Wildcats (Texas Conference) (1942–1949)
1942	Abilene Christian	6–2	3–1	2nd	
1943	No team—World War II				
1944	No team—World War II				
1945	No team—World War II				
1946	Abilene Christian	8–1–1	3–0–1	T–1st	
1947	Abilene Christian	6–3	3–2	3rd	
1948	Abilene Christian	5–3–1	3–1–1	T–2nd	
1949	Abilene Christian	3–6	1–4	5th	
Abilene Christian:		28–15–2	13–8–2		
Total:		28–15–2			
National championship Conference title Conference division title or championship game berth
