= 1947 Missouri Tigers football team =

American college football season

1947 Missouri Tigers football
- Conference: Big Six Conference
- Record: 6–4 (3–2 Big 6)
- Head coach: Don Faurot (10th season)
- Home stadium: Memorial Stadium

1947 Big Six Conference football standings
	Conf.					Overall
Team	W		L		T	W		L		T
No. 12 Kansas +	4	–	0	–	1	8	–	1	–	2
No. 16 Oklahoma +	4	–	0	–	1	7	–	2	–	1
Missouri	3	–	2	–	0	6	–	4	–	0
Nebraska	2	–	3	–	0	2	–	7	–	0
Iowa State	1	–	4	–	0	3	–	6	–	0
Kansas State	0	–	5	–	0	0	–	10	–	0
+ – Conference co-champions; Rankings from AP Poll

The 1947 Missouri Tigers football team was an American football team that represented the University of Missouri in the Big Six Conference (Big 6) during the 1947 college football season. The team compiled a 6–4 record (3–2 against Big 6 opponents), finished in third place in the Big 6, and outscored all opponents by a combined total of 240 to 116. Don Faurot was the head coach for the 10th of 19 seasons. The team played its home games at Memorial Stadium in Columbia, Missouri.

The team's statistical leaders included Harold "Bus" Entsminger with 446 rushing yards and 372 passing yards, Mel Sheehan with 218 receiving yards, and Nick Carras with 30 points scored.

Missouri was ranked at No. 28 or No. 136 (out of 500 college football teams) in the final Litkenhous Ratings for 1947.

== Schedule ==
Date	Opponent	Rank	Site	Result	Attendance	Source
September 20	Saint Louis*		Memorial Stadium; Columbia, MO	W 19–0	17,000	
September 27	at Ohio State*		Ohio Stadium; Columbus, OH	L 7–13	59,444	
October 4	at SMU*		Cotton Bowl; Dallas, TX	L 19–35	26,000	
October 11	at Colorado*		Folsom Field; Boulder, CO	W 21–0		
October 18	Kansas State		Memorial Stadium; Columbia, MO	W 47–7	18,000	
October 25	at Iowa State		Clyde Williams Field; Ames, IA (rivalry)	W 26–7	15,000	
November 1	Nebraska		Memorial Stadium; Columbia, MO (rivalry)	W 47–6	20,000	
November 8	at No. 13 Duke*		Duke Stadium; Durham, NC	W 28–7	25,000	
November 15	Oklahoma^{†}	No. 17	Memorial Stadium; Columbia, MO (rivalry)	L 12–21	28,500	
November 22	at No. 17 Kansas		Memorial Stadium; Lawrence, KS (rivalry)	L 14–20	40,043	
*Non-conference game; ^{†}Homecoming; Rankings from AP Poll released prior to the game

== Rankings ==
Ranking movements Legend: ██ Increase in ranking ██ Decrease in ranking — = Not ranked
	Week									
Poll	1	2	3	4	5	6	7	8	9	Final
AP	—	—	—	—	—	17	—	—	—	—
