= 1947 Kansas Jayhawks football team =

American college football season

1947 Kansas Jayhawks football

Big 6 co-champion

Orange Bowl, L 14–20 vs. Georgia Tech
- Conference: Big Six Conference

Ranking
- AP: No. 12
- Record: 8–1–2 (4–0–1 Big 6)
- Head coach: George Sauer (2nd season)
- Home stadium: Memorial Stadium

1947 Big Six Conference football standings
	Conf.					Overall
Team	W		L		T	W		L		T
No. 12 Kansas +	4	–	0	–	1	8	–	1	–	2
No. 16 Oklahoma +	4	–	0	–	1	7	–	2	–	1
Missouri	3	–	2	–	0	6	–	4	–	0
Nebraska	2	–	3	–	0	2	–	7	–	0
Iowa State	1	–	4	–	0	3	–	6	–	0
Kansas State	0	–	5	–	0	0	–	10	–	0
+ – Conference co-champions; Rankings from AP Poll

The 1947 Kansas Jayhawks football team was an American football team that represented the University of Kansas in the Big Six Conference during the 1947 college football season. In its second and final season under head coach George Sauer, the team compiled an 8–1–2 record (4–0–1 against conference opponents). They conference co-champions. The Jayhawks received their first ever AP Poll ranking in program history during the season. The team was undefeated in the regular season before losing to Georgia Tech in the 1948 Orange Bowl.

On October 11, 1947, the Jayhawks scored 86 points against South Dakota State which remains the highest point total in the history of the program.

Halfback Ray Evans was selected by the Associated Press and Grantland Rice as a first-team player on the 1947 All-America team. He was later inducted into the College Football Hall of Fame. Four Kansas players received first-team honors from the United Press on the 1947 All-Big Six Conference football team: Evans; end Otto Schnellbacher; guard Don Fambrough; and halfback Forrest Griffith.

Kansas was ranked at No. 21 (out of 500 college football teams) in the final Litkenhous Ratings for 1947.

The team played its home games at Memorial Stadium in Lawrence, Kansas.

== Schedule ==
Date	Opponent	Rank	Site	Result	Attendance	Source
September 20	vs. TCU*		Blues Stadium; Kansas City, MO	T 0–0	15,000	
September 26	at Denver*		Denver Stadium; Denver, CO	W 9–0	28,000	
October 4	Iowa State		Memorial Stadium; Lawrence, KS	W 27–7	17,500	
October 11	South Dakota State*		Memorial Stadium; Lawrence, KS	W 86–6	14,000	
October 18	at Oklahoma		Oklahoma Memorial Stadium; Norman, OK	T 13–13	34,700	
November 1	Kansas State		Memorial Stadium; Lawrence, KS (Sunflower Showdown)	W 55–0	20,033	
November 8	at Nebraska		Memorial Stadium; Lincoln, NE (rivalry)	W 13–7	37,000	
November 15	at Oklahoma A&M*		Lewis Field; Stillwater, OK	W 13–7	15,000	
November 22	Missouri^{†}	No. 17	Memorial Stadium; Lawrence, KS (Border War)	W 20–14	40,043	
November 29	at Arizona*	No. 13	Arizona Stadium; Tucson, AZ	W 54–28	14,000	
January 1, 1948	vs. No. 10 Georgia Tech	No. 12	Burdine Stadium; Miami, FL (Orange Bowl)	L 14–20	59,578	
*Non-conference game; ^{†}Homecoming; Rankings from AP Poll released prior to the game

== Rankings ==
Ranking movements Legend: ██ Increase in ranking ██ Decrease in ranking — = Not ranked т = Tied with team above or below
	Week									
Poll	1	2	3	4	5	6	7	8	9	Final
AP	—	—	—	—	—	—	17	13	13т	12

== After the season ==
=== NFL draft ===
The following Jayhawks were selected in the 1948 NFL draft following the season.

Round	Pick	Player	Position	NFL club
19	166	Don Ettinger	Guard	New York Giants
20	185	Dick Monroe	Center	Chicago Cardinals
