= 1947 Butler Bulldogs football team =

American college football season

1947 Butler Bulldogs football
- Conference: Mid-American Conference
- Record: 5–3–1 (1–3 MAC)
- Head coach: Tony Hinkle (10th season)
- Captain: Ott Hurrie
- Home stadium: Butler Bowl

1947 Mid-American Conference football standings
	Conf.					Overall
Team	W		L		T	W		L		T
Cincinnati $	3	–	1	–	0	7	–	3	–	0
Western Reserve	2	–	1	–	0	4	–	5	–	0
Butler	1	–	3	–	0	5	–	3	–	1
Ohio	1	–	3	–	0	3	–	5	–	1
Miami (OH) *	2	–	0	–	0	9	–	0	–	1
Western Michigan *	0	–	1	–	0	5	–	4	–	0
$ – Conference champion; * – Miami and Western Michigan were not eligible to compete for the MAC championship because they did not schedule a full slate of games against MAC opponents.

The 1947 Butler Bulldogs football team represented Butler University as a member of the Mid-American Conference (MAC) during the 1947 college football season. In its tenth season under head coach Tony Hinkle, the team compiled a 5–3–1 record (1–3 against MAC opponents) and finished in third place in the MAC. Butler played home games at the Butler Bowl in Indianapolis.

In the final Litkenhous Ratings released in mid-December, Butler was ranked at No. 179 out of 500 college football teams.

== Schedule ==
Date	Opponent	Site	Result	Attendance	Source
September 27	Ball State*	Butler Bowl; Indianapolis, IN	T 6–6	8,000	
October 4	at Ohio	Peden Stadium; Athens, OH	L 7–14		
October 11	Saint Joseph's (IN)*	Butler Bowl; Indianapolis, IN	W 21–0	5,500	
October 18	at Wabash*	Crawfordsville, IN	W 14–0	4,200	
October 25	Western Michigan^{†}	Butler Bowl; Indianapolis, IN	W 21–20	10,000	
November 1	DePauw*	Butler Bowl; Indianapolis, IN	W 35–0	4,890	
November 8	Western Reserve	Butler Bowl; Indianapolis, IN	L 0–6	8,000	
November 15	Valparaiso*	Butler Bowl; Indianapolis, IN	W 27–6		
November 22	at Cincinnati	Nippert Stadium; Cincinnati, OH	L 19–26	8,500	
*Non-conference game; ^{†}Homecoming
