= 1947 Nebraska Cornhuskers football team =

American college football season

1947 Nebraska Cornhuskers football
- Conference: Big Six Conference
- Record: 2–7 (2–3 Big 6)
- Head coach: Bernie Masterson (2nd season)
- Offensive scheme: T formation
- Home stadium: Memorial Stadium

1947 Big Six Conference football standings
	Conf.					Overall
Team	W		L		T	W		L		T
No. 12 Kansas +	4	–	0	–	1	8	–	1	–	2
No. 16 Oklahoma +	4	–	0	–	1	7	–	2	–	1
Missouri	3	–	2	–	0	6	–	4	–	0
Nebraska	2	–	3	–	0	2	–	7	–	0
Iowa State	1	–	4	–	0	3	–	6	–	0
Kansas State	0	–	5	–	0	0	–	10	–	0
+ – Conference co-champions; Rankings from AP Poll

The 1947 Nebraska Cornhuskers football team represented the University of Nebraska as a member of the Big Six Conference during the 1947 college football season. Led by Bernie Masterson in his second and final season as head coach, the Cornhuskers compiled an overall record of 2–7 with a mark of 2–3 in conference play, placing fourth in the Big 6.

Nebraska was ranked at No. 76 (out of 500 college football teams) in the final Litkenhous Ratings for 1947.

Nebraska played home games at Memorial Stadium in Lincoln, Nebraska.

== Before the season ==
Head coach Masterson, hired last year to restore the T formation offense, and Nebraska's historic dominance that had faded over the past several years, returned in his attempt to stem the program's unprecedented string of losing seasons at six. Never before this stretch had the Cornhuskers ever had even two consecutive losing football seasons, and as the fifth head coach of the Cornhuskers in the last eleven years, and with four of the six 1946 assistants departed and replaced with three new position coaches, turnover and instability at the top that had likely contributed to the long run of frustration was still a concern. It remained to be seen whether coach Masterson would be up to the challenge of Nebraska's recovery.

== Schedule ==
Date	Opponent	Site	Result	Attendance	Source
September 27	Indiana*	Memorial Stadium; Lincoln, NE	L 0–17	33,000	
October 4	Minnesota*	Memorial Stadium; Lincoln, NE (rivalry)	L 13–28	34,500	
October 11	at Iowa State	Clyde Williams Field; Ames, IA (rivalry)	W 14–7	12,500	
October 18	at No. 2 Notre Dame*	Notre Dame Stadium; Notre Dame, IN (rivalry)	L 0–31	56,000	
October 25	at Kansas State	Memorial Stadium; Manhattan, KS (rivalry)	W 14–7	17,000	
November 1	at Missouri	Memorial Stadium; Columbia, MO (rivalry)	L 6–47	20,000	
November 8	Kansas^{†}	Memorial Stadium; Lincoln, NE (rivalry)	L 7–13	37,000	
November 22	Oklahoma	Memorial Stadium; Lincoln, NE (rivalry)	L 13–14	28,000	
November 29	Oregon State*	Memorial Stadium; Lincoln, NE	L 6–27	20,000	
*Non-conference game; ^{†}Homecoming; Rankings from AP Poll released prior to the game

== Roster ==
Ackerman, Robert #10 HB; Adams, Dale #25 FB; Becker, Harold #19 T Bostwick, George #11 HB; Cochrane, Alex #67 E Collopy, Frank #28 FB; Copenhagen, Otto #43 E Costello, Robert #12 C Damkroger, Ralph #21 E Doyle, John #45 E Fischer, Cletus #14 QB; Fischer, Kenneth #15 HB; Gade, Gail #44 C Golan, Fred #40 T Hoy, Rex #63 G Hutton, Richard #66 HB; Jacupke, Gerald #74 G Lipps, Robert G Lorenz, Fred #53 G Mandula, Francis #73 G Means, Arden #58 G	Moomey, William #42 HB; Mueller, William #23 HB; Mullen, Robert #17 C Myers, James #70 FB; Novak, Tom #68 C Nyden, Ed #16 E Partington, Joe #20 QB; Pesek, Jack #50 E Riedy, Robert #51 FB; Sailors, Don #65 E Salestrom, Darwin #18 G Samuelson, Carl #55 T Sedlacek, John #24 G Sim, Eugene #29 T Thompson, Edgar #38 T Thompson, Richard #13 QB; Toogood, Charles #77 T Wiegand, Delbert #41 QB; Wilkins, Frank #37 G Young, Philip #46 FB

== Coaching staff ==
Name	Title	First year in this position	Years at Nebraska	Alma mater
Bernie Masterson	Head coach	1946	1946–1947	
L. F. "Pop" Klein	Assistant coach	1945	1945–1958	
John Johnson	Line Coach	1945	1945, 1947	
Ray Prochaska	End Coach	1946	1946–1948, 1950–1954	Nebraska
Tony Blazine	Line Coach	1947	1947–1948	Illinois Wesleyan
Dougal Russell	Backfield Coach	1947	1947–1948	Kansas State

== Game summaries ==
=== Indiana ===
Indiana at Nebraska

Team	1	2	3	4	Total
• Indiana	0	7	3	7	17
Nebraska	0	0	0	0	0

- Date: September 27
- Location: Memorial Stadium • Lincoln, Nebraska
- Game attendance: 37,000

The Hoosiers, long a source of frustration for Nebraska, continued their string of wins in the series by blanking the Cornhuskers to start coach Masterson's second season with a sound defeat. Though Nebraska once held the edge over Indiana at 3–0–2, the Hoosiers had run off seven wins straight to take command of the series.

=== Minnesota ===
Minnesota at Nebraska

Team	1	2	Total
• Minnesota			28
Nebraska			13

- Date: October 4
- Location: Memorial Stadium • Lincoln, Nebraska
- Game attendance: 34,000

The Cornhuskers sought to bounce back from the season opening loss, yet initially found themselves behind 0–14 against longtime rival Minnesota. Nebraska overcame the deficit as the game wore on, eventually drawing up within one point of the Golden Gophers in the fourth quarter, but Minnesota poured on the pressure and put away two more touchdowns to seal the game and take their 7th straight victory in the series, improving their edge over the Cornhuskers to 23–4–2.

=== Iowa State ===
Nebraska at Iowa State

Team	1	2	Total
• Nebraska			14
Iowa State			7

- Date: October 11
- Location: Clyde Williams Field • Ames, Iowa
- Game attendance: 13,590

Underdog Iowa State made their first serious attempt to get a win against Nebraska in several years, and rolled up the statistical advantage for their efforts, yet did not actually obtain the points to match. It was the bad luck of the Cyclones that a blocked punt was recovered by the Cornhuskers to put up the winning points and secure the first Nebraska win of the season and snap their three-game losing streak in the series. Iowa State fell to 8–32–1 against the Cornhuskers overall.

=== Notre Dame ===
Nebraska at #2 Notre Dame

Team	1	2	Total
Nebraska			0
• #2 Notre Dame			31

- Date: October 18
- Location: Notre Dame Stadium • Notre Dame, Indiana
- Game attendance: 56,000

After a long, twenty-six year layoff, Nebraska and Notre Dame finally resumed their series tied at 5–5–1 since their last meeting in 1925. Both schools hoped that the cultural aftereffects of the war in Europe would put to bed the hate-filled interactions that ended the series twenty years prior. Unlike their last meeting, however, Notre Dame was still in the position as national power and ranked #2 entering the game, while the Cornhuskers remained in the throes of trying to recover from a six-season slide. Thus it was not much of a surprise when Nebraska ended the day at Notre Dame Stadium with a shutout loss to the Fighting Irish in front of one of the largest crowds that the Cornhuskers had played in front of in many years. Despite the score, the game should have been closer than it seemed, but numerous scoring opportunities handed to Nebraska were time and again wasted on fumbles and other errors, putting Notre Dame in charge of the series for the first time since 1924. Notre Dame went on to finish 1947 unbeaten at 9–0 and shared the national title with Michigan.

=== Kansas State ===
Nebraska at Kansas State

Team	1	2	Total
• Nebraska			14
Kansas State			7

- Date: October 25
- Location: Memorial Stadium • Manhattan, Kansas
- Game attendance: 17,000

Nebraska was unable to finally put points up until the second half, but by holding Kansas State to a single touchdown, the Cornhuskers remained perfect in conference play. This was the fifth straight win for Nebraska in the series as the Cornhuskers improved over the Wildcats to 26–4–2 overall.

=== Missouri ===
Nebraska at Missouri

Team	1	2	Total
Nebraska			6
• Missouri			47

- Date: November 1
- Location: Faurot Field • Columbia, Missouri
- Game attendance: 22,000

Hopes for a respectable season began to crumble when the mighty Missouri football squad crushed Nebraska in Columbia. With Tiger starters pulled from the game, the Cornhuskers were still unable to prevent the Missouri backups from putting three scores up in the final quarter. Only a third-quarter touchdown prevented the insult of a shutout loss. It was Missouri's eighth win in the last ten meetings of the teams, but the Tigers were still ten wins behind in the series at 24–34–3. The Missouri-Nebraska Victory Bell was re-introduced after a period of inactivity during World War II, but the series trophy remained in custody of Missouri after the game.

=== Kansas ===
Kansas at Nebraska

Team	1	2	Total
• Kansas			13
Nebraska			7

- Date: November 8
- Location: Memorial Stadium • Lincoln, Nebraska
- Game attendance: 35,000

Kansas managed to secure a rare win in Lincoln with a touchdown punched through Nebraska's defenses in the final 40 seconds of the contest to deny celebration to the crowd of 22,000 present for the Cornhusker homecoming game. The Jayhawks went on to finish the season 8–0–2 and ranked 12th by the AP Poll, sharing the Big 6 championship with Oklahoma. Nebraska's firm series ownership was still safe at 40–11–3.

=== Oklahoma ===
Oklahoma at Nebraska

Team	1	2	3	4	Total
• Oklahoma	0	7	7	0	14
Nebraska	0	6	7	0	13

- Date: November 22
- Location: Memorial Stadium • Lincoln, Nebraska
- Game attendance: 25,000

Oklahoma snatched away their fifth straight win over Nebraska in a hard-fought contest decided by a single missed conversion in the second quarter. Attempts by both teams to decide the game in the fourth quarter were turned away. The Cornhuskers still owned a 16–8–3 edge in the series, though the Sooners were slowly and steadily chipping away at the lead. Oklahoma went on to finish 1947 with a 7–2–1 record, a #16 AP Poll ranking, and shared the Big 6 title with Kansas.

=== Oregon State ===
Oregon State at Nebraska

Team	1	2	Total
• Oregon State			27
Nebraska			6

- Date: November 29
- Location: Memorial Stadium • Lincoln, Nebraska
- Game attendance: 20,000

The Oregon State Beavers had not met Nebraska on the field since 1936, and arrived in Lincoln with several losses behind them, leading some to assume the Cornhuskers would not have serious trouble securing a season-ending win. Someone forget to tell Oregon State that they were supposed to lose, however, and the Beavers spent the day romping and outplaying the Nebraska squad in every way. The Cornhuskers managed just a single touchdown as Oregon State out-rushed them 190–42 and out-passed them 254–31. It was a harsh ending to Nebraska's season, as the Beavers secured their first win in the series after six attempts.

== After the season ==
Head coach Masterson's second season was step backwards for a team already in a record-setting slide. This was the seventh losing season in a row, and coach Masterson's first head coaching position became his last. His overall coaching career of 5–13–0 (.278) was the third-lowest in program history to date, though his Big 6 record broke even at 5–5–0 (.500). Nebraska's overall record slipped to 314–140–31 (.679) and the Cornhuskers Big 6 total also fell slightly, to 118–33–11 (.762). Another coaching change was upon Nebraska, where the continuing turnover was causing harm but could not be avoided.
