= 1948 Orange Bowl =

American college football game

- 14th Orange Bowl
- Burdine Stadium in Miami, Florida, hosted the Orange Bowl.
Kansas Jayhawks	Georgia Tech Yellow Jackets
(8–0–2)	(9–1)
Big Six	SEC
14	20
Head coach: George Sauer	Head coach: Bobby Dodd
AP 12	AP 10
	1	2	3	4	Total
Kansas	0	7	0	7	14
Georgia Tech	0	7	13	0	20
- Date: January 1, 1948
- Season: 1947
- Stadium: Burdine Stadium
- Location: Miami, Florida
- Referee: T. G. Kain (SEC; split crew: SEC, Big Six)
- Attendance: 59,578

The 1948 Orange Bowl featured the Kansas Jayhawks and the Georgia Tech Yellow Jackets.

== Background ==
Kansas had completed their second straight Big Six Conference title in their final year under Sauer, and were appearing in their first ever bowl game. The Yellow Jackets had finished 2nd in the Southeastern Conference, appearing in their second straight bowl game under Dodd, and their first Orange Bowl since 1945.

== Game summary ==
The Jayhawks were a team not favored by many, with some favoring the Jackets as a 13 point favorite, and Georgia Tech took the lead first on a James Patton touchdown catch from Jim Stil. Ray Evans would respond with a touchdown run to make it 7-7 at halftime. Still would throw two touchdowns in the third quarter, one each to Billy Queen and Still to make it a 20-7 lead heading into the final quarter. But the Jayhawks would not back down as Evans caught a touchdown pass and narrowed the lead to 20-14, as Kansas was in position to drive for the win. But with :37 seconds left, quarterback Lynne McNutt fumbled on a quarterback sneak and in the ensuing pile, it was determined that Rollo Phillips of Georgia Tech recovered the ball, clinching the victory.

== Aftermath ==
Sauer would leave Kansas after the game, and the Jayhawks would not return to a bowl game until 1961 nor return to the Orange Bowl until 1969. Georgia Tech would go to two more Orange Bowls under Dodd's tenure before his retirement in 1966.

== Statistics ==
Statistics	GT	KU
First downs	9	14
Yards rushing	75	77
Yards passing	129	158
Total yards	204	235
Punts-Average	9-40.0	7/34.0
Fumbles-Lost	1-1	4-1
Interceptions	0	1
Penalties-Yards	10-70	5-37
