= 1947 Western Reserve Red Cats football team =

American college football season

1947 Western Reserve Red Cats football
- Conference: Mid-American Conference
- Record: 4–5 (2–1 MAC)
- Head coach: Tom Davies (4th season; first 5 games); Richard W. Luther (last 4 games)
- Home stadium: League Park

1947 Mid-American Conference football standings
	Conf.					Overall
Team	W		L		T	W		L		T
Cincinnati $	3	–	1	–	0	7	–	3	–	0
Western Reserve	2	–	1	–	0	4	–	5	–	0
Butler	1	–	3	–	0	5	–	3	–	1
Ohio	1	–	3	–	0	3	–	5	–	1
Miami (OH) *	2	–	0	–	0	9	–	0	–	1
Western Michigan *	0	–	1	–	0	5	–	4	–	0
$ – Conference champion; * – Miami and Western Michigan were not eligible to compete for the MAC championship because they did not schedule a full slate of games against MAC opponents.

The 1947 Western Reserve Red Cats football team represented the Western Reserve University in the American city of Cleveland, Ohio, now known as Case Western Reserve University, during the 1947 college football season. The Red Cats were a member of the Mid-American Conference (MAC).

The team was coached by Tom Davies, who was fired and replaced by assistant coach Dick Luther beginning game six.

In the final Litkenhous Ratings released in mid-December, Western Reserve was ranked at No. 145 out of 500 college football teams.

== Schedule ==
Date	Opponent	Site	Result	Attendance	Source
September 27	at Duquesne*	Forbes Field; Pittsburgh, PA	L 0–6	7,608	
October 4	at Rutgers*	Rutgers Stadium; Piscataway, NJ	L 6–21	10,000	
October 11	Ohio	League Park; Cleveland, OH	W 20–7	7,700	
October 18	at Wayne*	University of Detroit Stadium; Detroit, MI	L 13–20	24,375	
October 25	Baldwin–Wallace*	League Park; Cleveland, OH	L 6–13	5,126	
October 31	at Akron*	Rubber Bowl; Akron, OH	W 18–0	5,278	
November 8	at Butler	Butler Bowl; Indianapolis, IN	W 6–0	8,000	
November 15	Cincinnati	League Park; Cleveland, OH	L 6–7	< 2,000	
November 27	Case*	League Park; Cleveland, OH	W 13–12	8,500	
*Non-conference game
