= 1947 Arizona Wildcats football team =

American college football season

1947 Arizona Wildcats football
- Conference: Border Conference
- Record: 5–4–1 (3–2 Border)
- Head coach: Mike Casteel (7th season)
- Captain: Fred Knez
- Home stadium: Arizona Stadium

1947 Border Conference football standings
	Conf.					Overall
Team	W		L		T	W		L		T
Texas Tech $	4	–	0	–	0	6	–	5	–	0
Hardin–Simmons	5	–	1	–	0	8	–	3	–	0
West Texas State	5	–	2	–	0	7	–	4	–	0
Arizona	3	–	2	–	0	5	–	4	–	1
Texas Mines	3	–	3	–	1	5	–	3	–	1
Arizona State	3	–	4	–	0	4	–	7	–	0
New Mexico	1	–	5	–	1	4	–	5	–	1
New Mexico A&M	1	–	4	–	0	3	–	6	–	0
Arizona State–Flagstaff	0	–	4	–	0	1	–	7	–	0
$ – Conference champion

The 1947 Arizona Wildcats football team represented the University of Arizona in the Border Conference during the 1947 college football season. In their seventh season under head coach Mike Casteel, the Wildcats compiled a 5–4–1 record (3–2 against Border opponents), finished in fourth place in the conference, and were outscored by their opponents, 241 to 233. The team captain was Fred Knez. The team played its home games in Arizona Stadium in Tucson, Arizona.

Fred Enke led the team with 1,406 passing yards (88 of 184 passing) and 538 net rushing yards on 146 carries. His combined tally of 1,944 yards of total offense was the best in the country.

Arizona was ranked at No. 92 (out of 500 college football teams) in the final Litkenhous Ratings for 1947.

== Schedule ==
Date	Opponent	Site	Result	Attendance	Source
September 27	Wyoming*	Arizona Stadium; Tucson, AZ	W 27–7	15,000	
October 4	Montana*	Arizona Stadium; Tucson, AZ	W 40–7	14,300	
October 11	at Hardin–Simmons	Fair Park Stadium; Abilene, TX	L 7–35	6,500	
October 18	at Texas Mines	Kidd Field; El Paso, TX	W 14–13	12,000	
October 25	New Mexico	Arizona Stadium; Tucson, AZ (rivalry)	W 22–12	15,000	
November 8	at Texas Tech	Tech Stadium; Lubbock, TX	L 28–41	11,000	
November 15	at Arizona State	Goodwin Stadium; Tempe, AZ (rivalry)	W 26–13	15,000	
November 22	Marquette*	Arizona Stadium; Tucson, AZ	L 21–39	14,500	
November 29	No. 13 Kansas*	Arizona Stadium; Tucson, AZ	L 28–54	14,000	
December 6	Utah*	Arizona Stadium; Tucson, AZ	T 20–20		
*Non-conference game; Rankings from AP Poll released prior to the game
