= 1947 Texas Tech Red Raiders football team =

American college football season

1947 Texas Tech Red Raiders football

Border champion

Sun Bowl, L 12–13 vs. Miami (OH)
- Conference: Border Conference
- Record: 6–5 (4–0 Border)
- Head coach: Dell Morgan (7th season)
- Offensive scheme: Single-wing
- Base defense: 6–2
- Home stadium: Tech Stadium, Jones Stadium

1947 Border Conference football standings
	Conf.					Overall
Team	W		L		T	W		L		T
Texas Tech $	4	–	0	–	0	6	–	5	–	0
Hardin–Simmons	5	–	1	–	0	8	–	3	–	0
West Texas State	5	–	2	–	0	7	–	4	–	0
Arizona	3	–	2	–	0	5	–	4	–	1
Texas Mines	3	–	3	–	1	5	–	3	–	1
Arizona State	3	–	4	–	0	4	–	7	–	0
New Mexico	1	–	5	–	1	4	–	5	–	1
New Mexico A&M	1	–	4	–	0	3	–	6	–	0
Arizona State–Flagstaff	0	–	4	–	0	1	–	7	–	0
$ – Conference champion

The 1947 Texas Tech Red Raiders football team was an American football team that represented Texas Technological College (later known as Texas Tech University) as a member of the Border Conference during the 1947 college football season. In its seventh season under head coach Dell Morgan, the team compiled a 6–5 record (4–0 against conference opponents), lost to Miami (OH) in the 1948 Sun Bowl, and outscored all opponents by a total of 228 to 184.

In the final Litkenhous Ratings released in mid-December, Texas Tech was ranked at No. 140 out of 500 college football teams.

The team played its first four home games at Tech Stadium in Lubbock, Texas. The final home game of the season was played on November 29, 1947, at the new Clifford B. and Audrey Jones Stadium. The new concrete and steel stadium was built at a cost of $400,000 and was named in honor of the college's president emeritus and his wife.

== Schedule ==
Date	Opponent	Site	Result	Attendance	Source
September 20	at Texas*	Memorial Stadium; Austin, TX (rivalry)	L 0–33	30,000	
September 27	vs. Texas A&M*	Alamo Stadium; San Antonio, TX (rivalry)	L 7–29	20,000	
October 4	West Texas State	Tech Stadium; Lubbock, TX	W 21–13	11,000	
October 11	Tulsa*	Tech Stadium; Lubbock, TX	W 14–7	12,500	
October 18	Baylor*	Tech Stadium; Lubbock, TX (rivalry)	L 6–32	13,000–13,106	
October 25	at Denver*	DU Stadium; Denver, CO	W 36–7	17,947	
November 1	at Rice*	Rice Field; Houston, TX	L 7–40	16,000	
November 8	Arizona	Tech Stadium; Lubbock, TX	W 41–28	11,000	
November 22	at New Mexico	Zimmerman Field; Albuquerque, NM	W 26–20	10,000	
November 29	Hardin–Simmons^{†}	Jones Stadium; Lubbock, TX	W 14–6	20,000	
January 1, 1948	vs. Miami (OH)*	Kidd Field; El Paso, TX (Sun Bowl)	L 12–13	15,000	
*Non-conference game; ^{†}Homecoming
