= Administration Building (Texas Tech University) =

Coordinates: 33.5832°N 101.8746°W

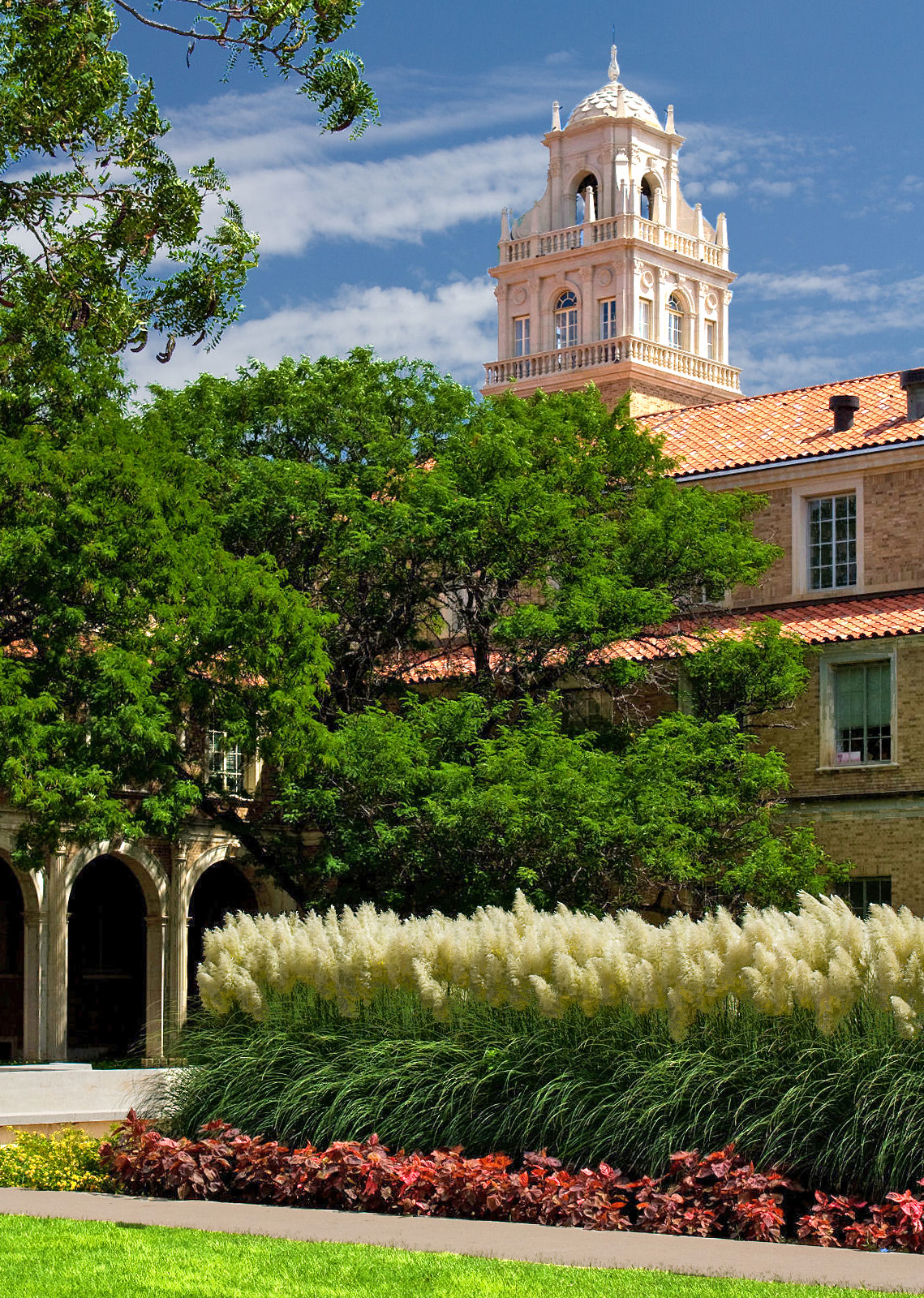
- The Administration Building on the Texas Tech University campus
- Interactive map of the Administration Building area

General information
- Architectural style: Spanish Renaissance
- Location: Lubbock, Texas
- Construction started: 1924
- Completed: 1925

Technical details
- Floor count: 4

Design and construction
- Architect: Wyatt C. Hedrick

The Administration Building is a structure on the campus of Texas Tech University in Lubbock, Texas. It was one of the original buildings on the campus, and is modeled after the Universidad de Alcala de Henares in Alcalá de Henares, Spain. The Admin building has three floors and a basement and includes twin bell towers, double wings, and a courtyard. Some of the offices housed in the building include the Chancellor's Office, President's Office and Board of Regents Office.

== Architecture ==
Although the north facade draws inspiration from the Universidad de Alcala de Henares, the Administration Building is reminiscent of a typical mid-sixteenth-century, Plateresque period Spanish Alcaldia or city hall. The north facade of the building contains fine detailed ornamentation and is symbolic of the historical background of the region, and the philosophical aims and goals of the early Texas Technological College. The selection of much of the ornamentation of the building is credited to Texas Tech College's first president, Dr. Paul Horn, including two quotes on the north facade. The seals of Spain, France, Mexico, the Confederacy, the United States and Texas are also depicted on the north facade and symbolize the six nations that have had sovereignty over Texas at various times. Over the ten twin-arched windows of the second level of the north facade appear ten portrait medallions of significant figures in American and Texas history: Christopher Columbus, George Washington, Abraham Lincoln, Robert E. Lee, Woodrow Wilson, Jim Hogg, Albert Sidney Johnston, Davy Crockett, Stephen F. Austin, and Sam Houston.

== Victory Bells ==
The Victory Bells consists of two bells, one large and one small, and are housed in the east bell tower. The bells were given to Texas Tech as a class gift in 1936 and were first rung at the class of 1936's graduation. Each graduate contributed $2 towards the cost of the bells.

The Saddle Tramps and High Riders ring the Victory Bells after every varsity team's win. The tradition began on September 19, 1936, after the Red Raiders football team defeated Texas Wesleyan 26–7. The following Friday at a pep rally, head yell leader Arch Lamb told Texas Tech students, "if we gig the Horned Frogs the victory bells will be rung until 6 o'clock Sunday morning." After the Red Raiders defeated the TCU Horned Frogs 7–0 the following day, the team's first victory over a Southwest Conference opponent, the bells rang, keeping Lubbock residents up all through the night. Thereafter, the bell ringing was limited to 30 minutes.

== Baird Memorial Carillon ==
In 1973, Ruth Baird Larabee donated money to the university to buy and install a carillon in the west bell tower, in memory of her parents Charles and Ruth Baird. Originally consisting of 36 bells, the carillon was refurbished and extended in 2005, bringing the total range of the instrument to 3 1/2 octaves. Twelve of the original bells were cast by the Whitechapel Bell Foundry in England, the remaining twenty-four original bells were cast in France by the Paccard Foundry, and the newest bells were cast by the Meek & Watson Foundry in Ohio. The estimated value of the collection is $250,000.

The carillon has been featured in the Carol of Lights every year since its inception in 1959. The carillon is played at 1:00 p.m. on July 4 in conjunction with the ceremonial ringing of the Liberty Bell, in Philadelphia, Pennsylvania. The carillon also features Sunday evening concerts each summer.

== Double T Bench ==
The Double T Bench, a bench in the shape of the Double T, is located in the courtyard of the Admin Building. The bench was a gift to the university by the class of 1931. It was an announced tradition that no freshmen were allowed to sit on the bench, a tradition that had faded by the 1950s.

== Photo gallery ==
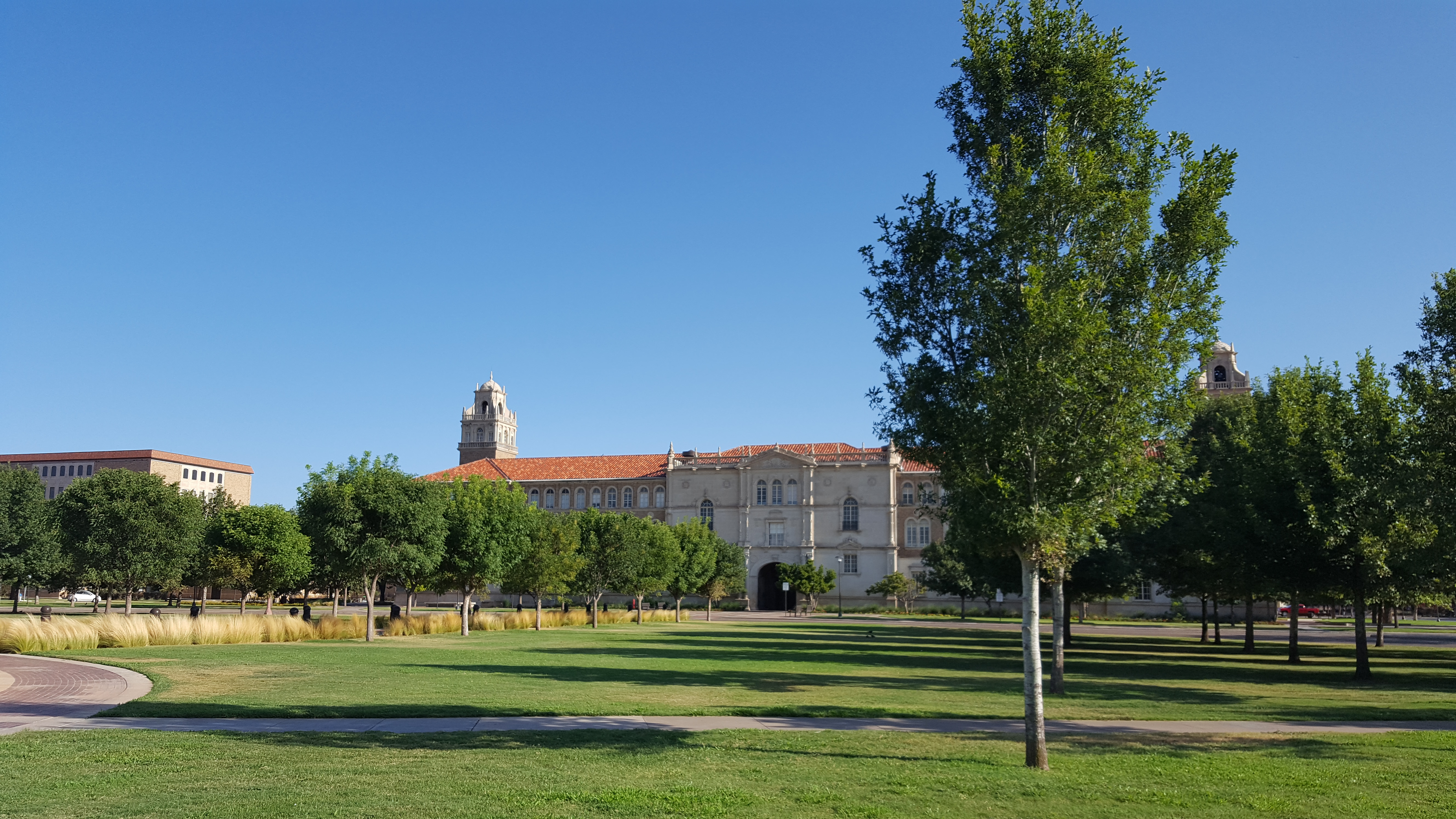
Administration Building in 2019

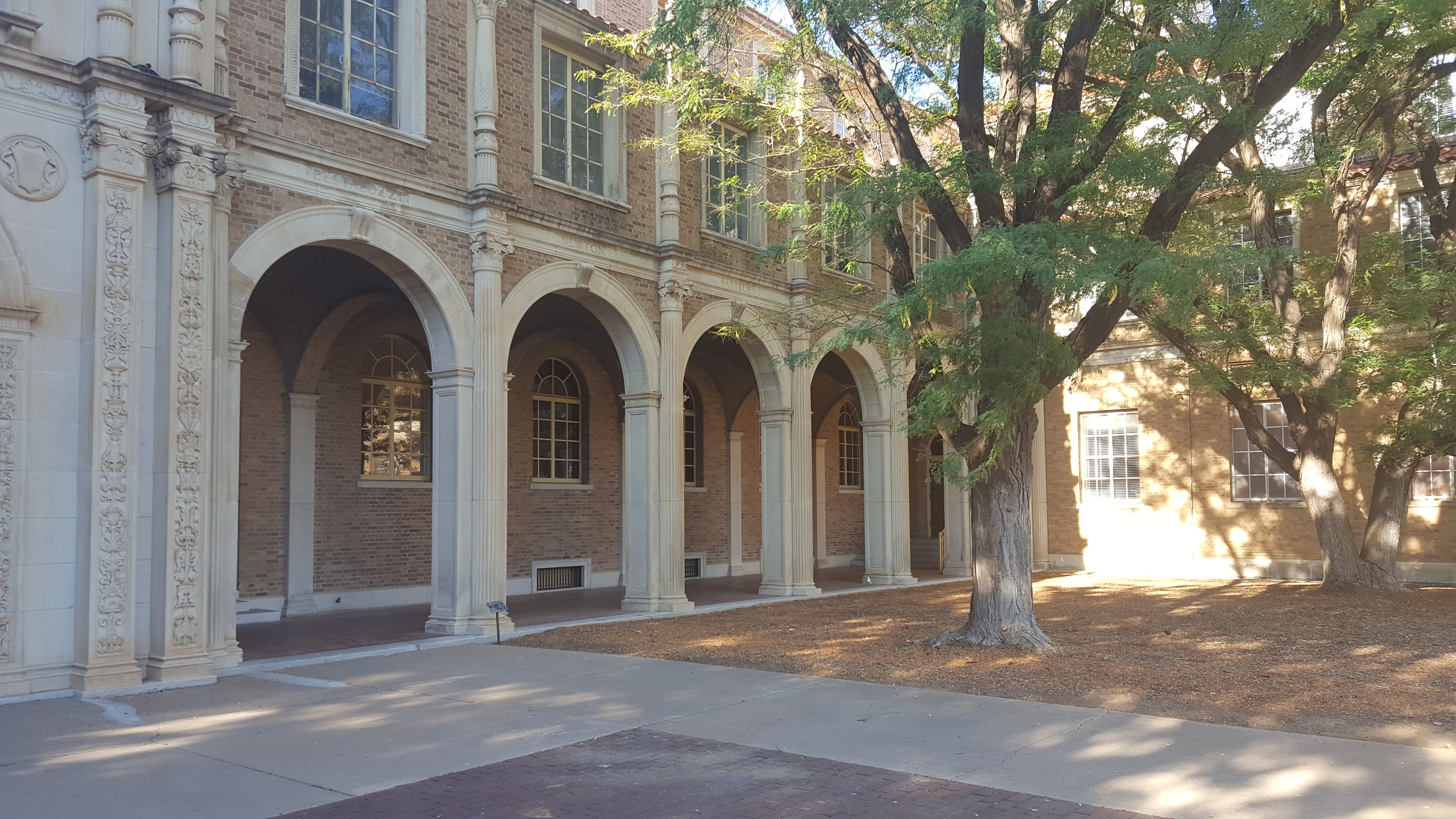
Administration Building Courtyard

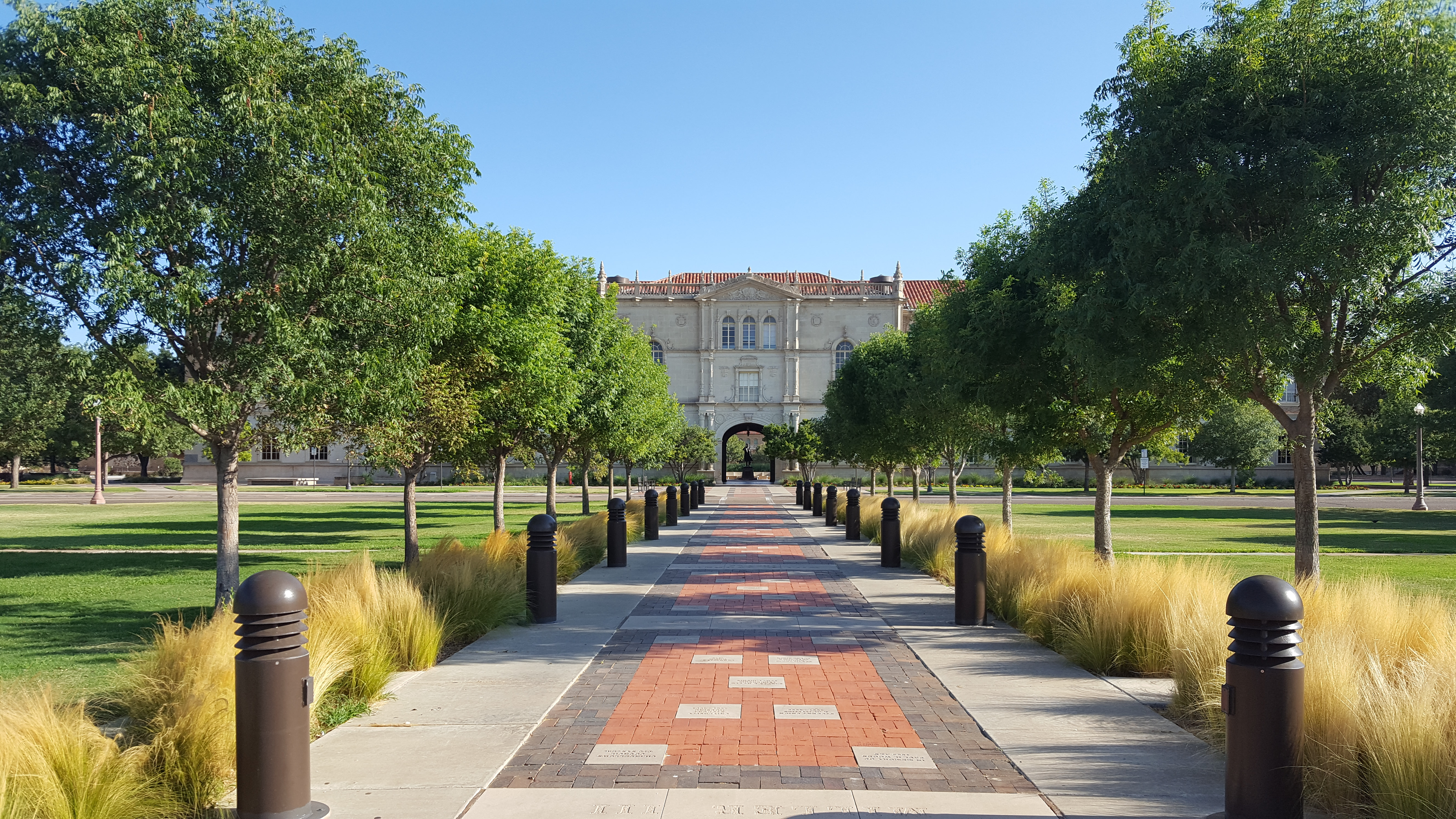
View from Memorial Circle
