= Galaxy Stadium =

Stadium in Lubbock, Texas

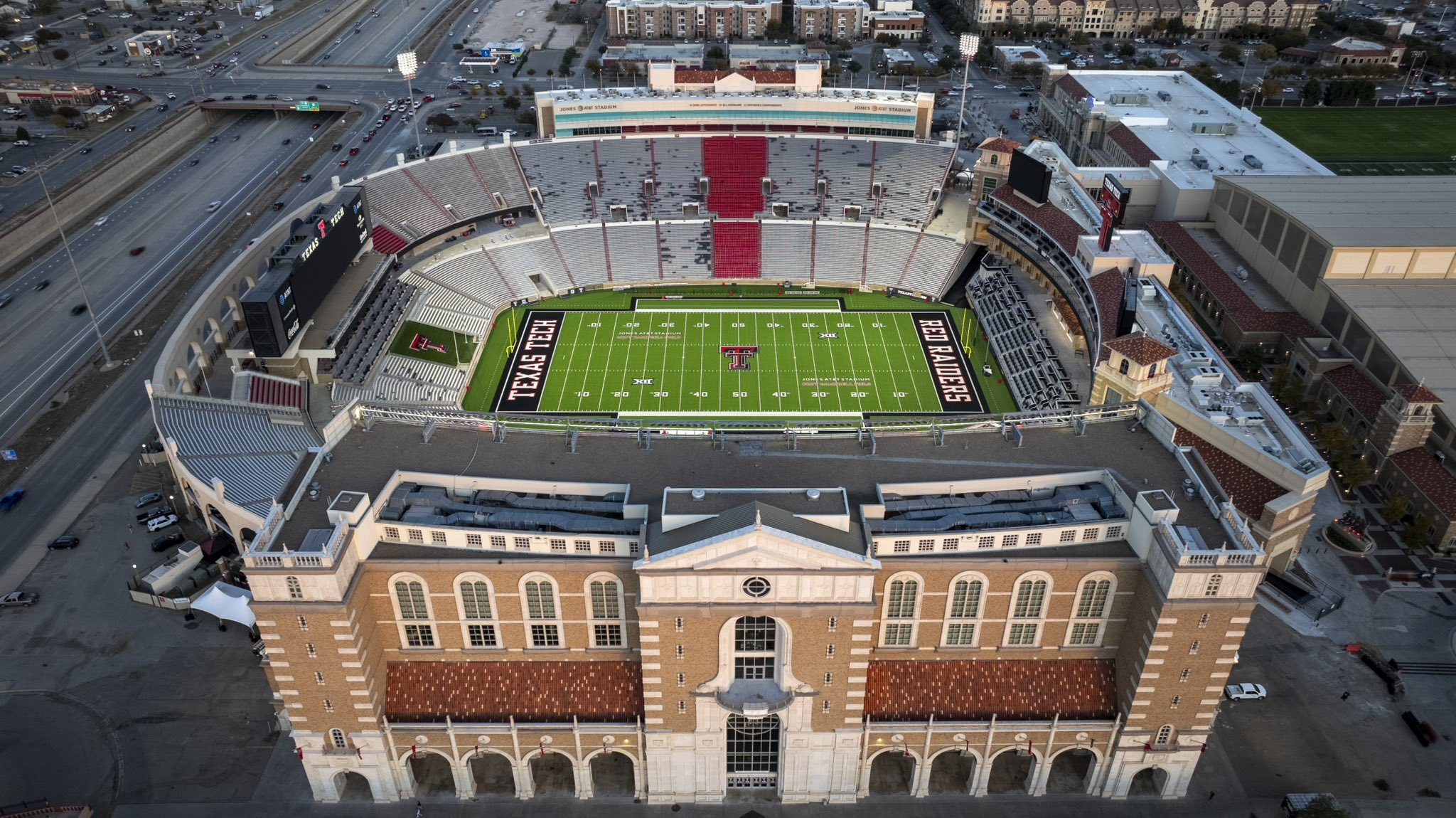
- Aerial view from west in 2024

- Location within the United States Location within Texas
- Interactive map of Galaxy Stadium
- Former names: Jones AT&T Stadium (2006–2026); Jones SBC Stadium (2000–2006); Clifford B. & Audrey Jones Stadium (1947–2000)
- Address: 2526 Mac Davis Lane
- Location: Texas Tech University; Lubbock, Texas, U.S.
- Coordinates: 33°35′28″N 101°52′22″W
- Elevation: 3,215 feet (980 m) AMSL
- Owner: Texas Tech University
- Operator: Texas Tech University
- Capacity: 60,229 Former capacity: 56,200 (2023); 60,454 (2010–2022); 58,930 (2009); 53,000 (2003–2008); 48,000 (1972–2002); 41,500 (1959–1971); 27,000 (1947–1958)
- Executive suites: 102
- Surface: Hellas Matrix Helix (2023–present); FieldTurf (2006–2022); AstroTurf (1970–2005); Natural grass (1947–1969)
- Scoreboard: Daktronics; North: 139.4' by 37.2'; South: 2 × 27' by 48'
- Record attendance: 61,836 (vs. Oklahoma State, November 2, 2013)

Construction
- Groundbreaking: March 17, 1947
- Opened: November 29, 1947; 78 years ago
- Renovated: 2003, 2009–2010, 2022–2024
- Expanded: 1959, 1972, 2003, 2005, 2010, 2013
- Cost: $400,000 ($5.77 million in 2025)
- Architects: Haynes & Kirby; Parkhill, Smith & Cooper; Ellerbe Becket (renovation)
- General contractor: Oldt-Mid West Company

Tenants
- Texas Tech Red Raiders (NCAA) (1947–present); Coaches All-America Game (AFCA) (1970–1976)

Website
- texastech.com/jones-at&t-stadium

Galaxy Stadium (commonly referred to as "The Jones") is an outdoor athletic stadium on the campus of Texas Tech University in Lubbock, Texas. Built in the style of Spanish Renaissance architecture, it is the home field of the Texas Tech Red Raiders of the Big 12 Conference.

== History ==
=== Planning and funding ===
Clifford B. and Audrey Jones Stadium opened 78 years ago on November 29, 1947, with a seating capacity of 27,000. It was named after Clifford B. Jones, Texas Tech's third president (1939–1944), and his wife, Audrey, who donated $100,000 (equivalent to $1.44 million in 2025) towards its construction. The inaugural game was held on November 29, with Texas Tech defeating Hardin–Simmons 14–6.

=== Expansion ===
The stadium's first expansion in 1959 raised the seating capacity to 41,500. The existing east stands were moved in sections a few feet at a time via steel rollers upon Santa Fe Railway rails and moved 150 feet (46 m) further east, and the playing surface was lowered 28 feet (8.5 m) below street level to accommodate the new lower bowl. The stadium was expanded again in 1972 with new red metal seats on the north side, increasing capacity to 48,000.

=== Modernization ===
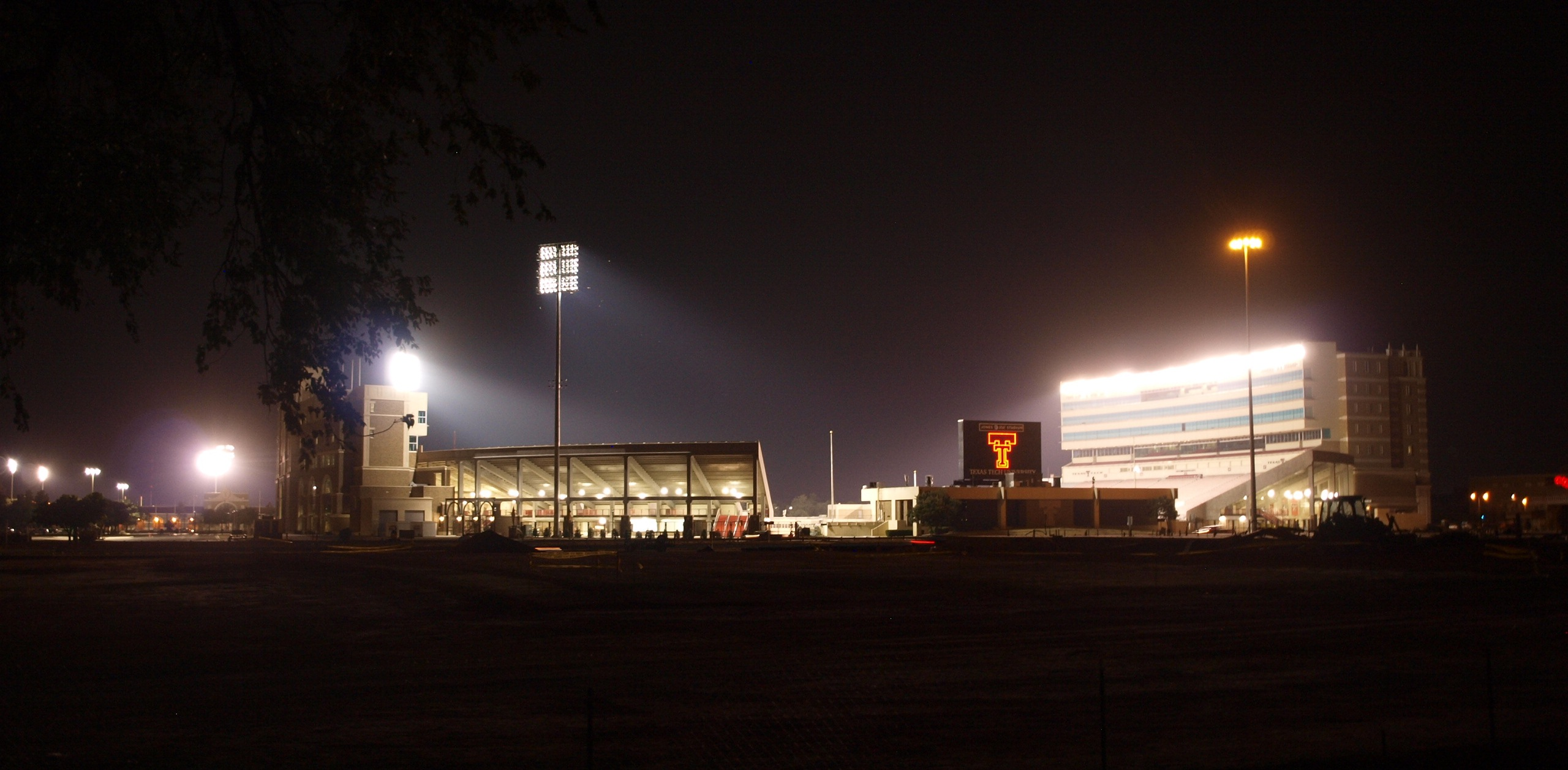
View (looking south) at night in August 2010 with construction of the east side ongoing

The largest renovation project to date was the construction of a $51.9 million, 175,000-square-foot (16,300 m^{2}) press box on the stadium's west side that included luxury suites, club seating and decks for television cameras and the press. The project added 2,000 seats and was completed during the 2003 season.

The stadium name was changed to Jones SBC Stadium in 2000 due to a naming rights agreement with SBC Communications, then led by Texas Tech alumnus and CEO Edward Whitacre, Jr. SBC Communications funded a large part of the stadium's West Stadium Club expansion. On April 6, 2006, the facility officially changed to its next name of Jones AT&T Stadium as a result of SBC's purchase of AT&T Corporation and adoption of AT&T as its new corporate name.

For 2006, the stadium was upgraded with a $2 million inner field wall that matches the traditional Texas Tech style brick façade. An inscribing of the Matador Song at the Double T in the north and south end zones was also added.

In February 2006, the university announced plans to add $60 million worth of upgrades including additional luxury suites, a 1,000-car parking garage, an upper deck, a facade on the east side of the stadium and more seating. The entire project was set to begin following the 2006 season but was cancelled before being re-initiated as a different project in 2008.

=== East Side Building ===
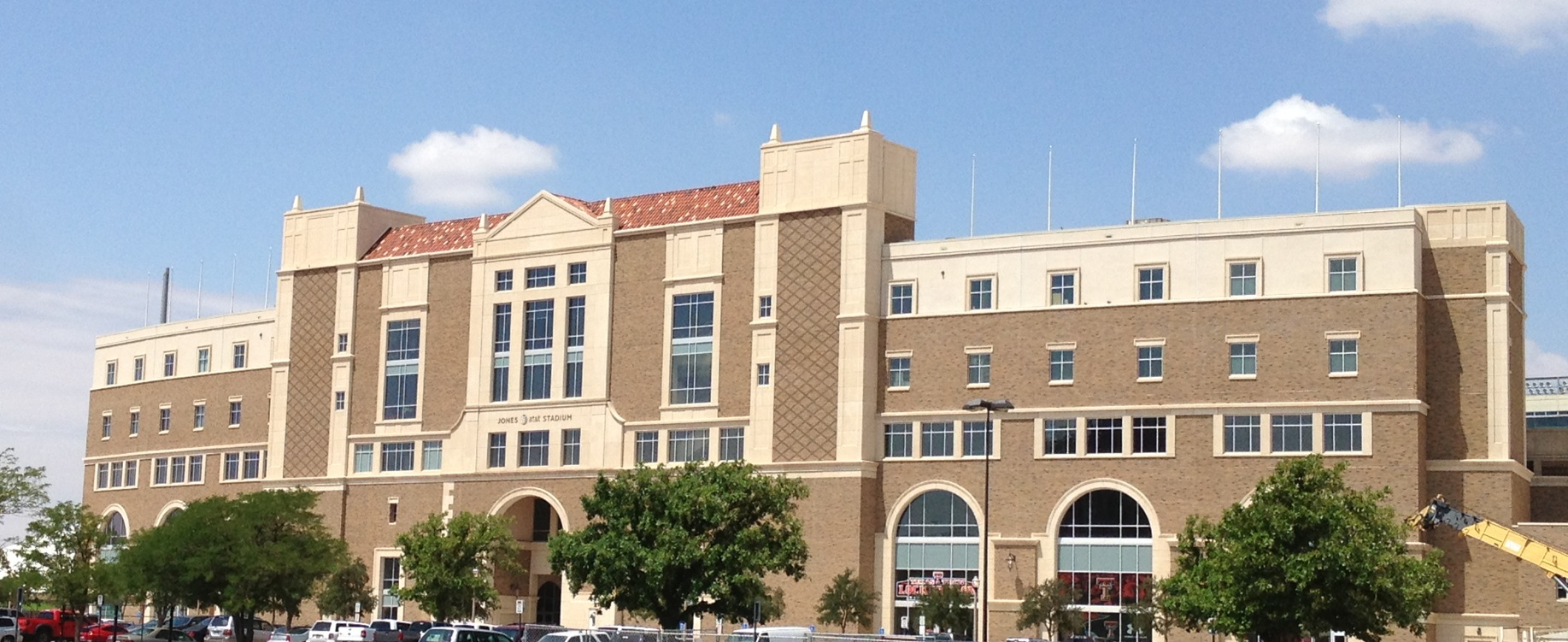
The east side building post-completion

On August 7, 2008, the Texas Tech University System Board of Regents announced a $25 million expansion project. The planned expansion added a Spanish Renaissance-themed façade to the east side of the stadium. In addition to the improvements to the exterior of the facility, the expansion added 1,000 general-admission seats, 550 club seats, and 26 suites. Texas Tech allocated a total of $19 million to the expansion and added another $6 million through fund-raising initiatives.

On November 20, 2008, university officials announced that the project's fundraising goal had been exceeded. Most of the money came from private donations, including a large contribution from AT&T and a $1 million matching gift from Board of Regents member Larry Anders. A small amount of the funds was delegated to come from future ticket sales. Groundbreaking ceremonies for the expansion took place on November 29, 2008. Construction began following the 2008 season, and was completed in 2010, bringing the total amount of suites to 89 and seating capacity to 60,454.

=== North end zone ===
In May 2009, it was announced an additional 6,100 seats would be added in the northeast and northwest end zones by mid-season. The additional general admission seating was opened in the north end of the stadium on October 24, 2009, bringing capacity at that time to 58,930.

In January 2013, construction began adding another 368 seats in the north end zone, in addition to an observation decks that holds 40. The $16 million project also included a significantly upgraded jumbotron with a new sound system, a Spanish Renaissance-themed colonnade, and a new north end zone concourse connecting the two stadium halves. Along with the other additions, 157 feet of ribbon board were added on the north end zone; more than 160 linear feet in the northeast and northwest corners of the stadium, and 94 lineal feet in the south end zone over the athletic offices. The construction was completed in November 2013.

As part of these renovations, the Double T scoreboard was also updated with new white LED panels and many seats in the stadium were repainted red. Additionally, AT&T completed an upgrade to its distributed antenna system in the stadium, increasing data capacity and call reliability.

Prior to the 2016 season, the north end zone was further renovated. What was the ticket office was converted into a club area and premium loge seating was added outside. A remnant of the grass berm that originally encircled the north bowl was converted from grass to artificial turf as well.

=== South end zone ===
On August 29, 2014, a $185 million fundraising campaign was announced for multiple athletic projects. It is the first solely athletic focused campaign started by the university. The headlining project of the campaign is a renovation of the south end zone athletic offices into a premium seating area with luxury suites. Replacing of stadium seatbacks and FieldTurf is also included in the project's budget.

On December 2, 2021, Cody Campbell, a former player and Board of Regents member, donated $25 million towards the south end zone project. In recognition of his donation, the playing field was named Cody Campbell Field. Construction began on November 27, 2022, and is expected to last until May 2024.

=== 2026–27 name changes ===
On February 19, 2026, Texas Tech athletic director Kirby Hocutt announced that AT&T would not renew its naming agreements for the stadium, though it would continue its exclusive telecommunications partnership with the university after the naming rights expire in June 2026; the stadium would likely be named just Jones Stadium for the 2026 season, with Hocutt stating a naming rights agreement with a possible new corporate partner that could begin in early 2027. On July 17, 2026, the name was changed to Galaxy Stadium after a new 15-year deal was signed with Galaxy Digital, a tech infrastructure company whose Helios Data Center is located in Dickens County.

== Features ==
=== Scoreboard ===
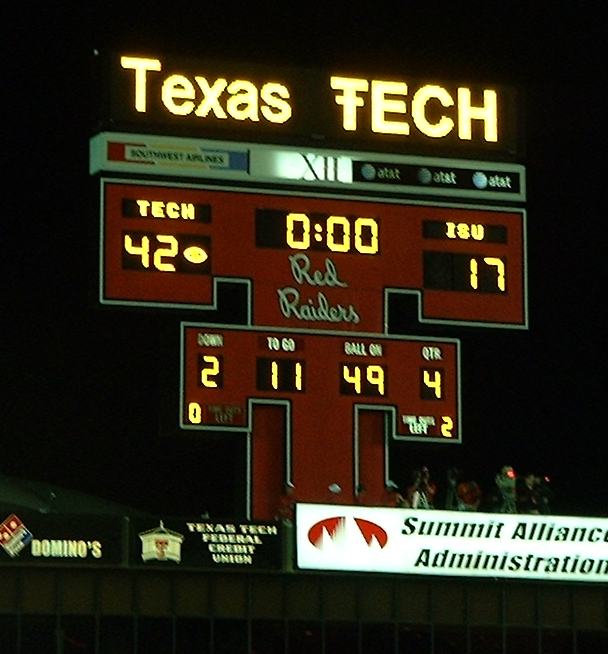
Double T scoreboard

The unique Double T scoreboard modeled in the fashion of Texas Tech's logo is emplaced on the roof of the athletic department offices in the south end zone and was installed prior to the beginning of the 1978 season. The scoreboard has remained in place through multiple stadium renovations due to its iconic and symbolic value, and received upgraded white LED panel installations in 2013. The iconic scoreboard was removed on December 1, 2022 as part of the Southeast End Zone Expansion, but a new version was installed in the South Endzone area on March 4, 2024.

=== Playing surface ===
The playing field runs in the traditional north-south configuration and sits thirty feet (9 m) below grade at an elevation of 3,215 feet (980 m) above sea level. It was natural grass from 1947 through 1969; AstroTurf was first installed in 1970, and replaced by infilled FieldTurf in 2006.

=== Seating ===
After numerous renovations and expansions, Galaxy Stadium currently seats 60,229. The capacity makes the stadium the 44th largest college football stadium in the United States. Officially, Galaxy Stadium has the third-highest seating capacity of any college-specific venue in Texas behind Darrell K Royal-Texas Memorial Stadium in Austin and Kyle Field in College Station, but when referred to by actual seating capacity the stadium drops to fourth behind San Antonio's Alamodome. The Alamodome's main football tenant, the UTSA Roadrunners, normally sells tickets only in the stadium's lower bowl, whose capacity is less than 35,000. Rice Stadium was once larger, but now seats 47,000, and is scheduled to be further downsized to about 30,000 by the end of the 2020s.

There are 13,750 seats designated for students between 14 sections. An additional section was allotted to students following record demand during the 2013 season.

=== Video board ===
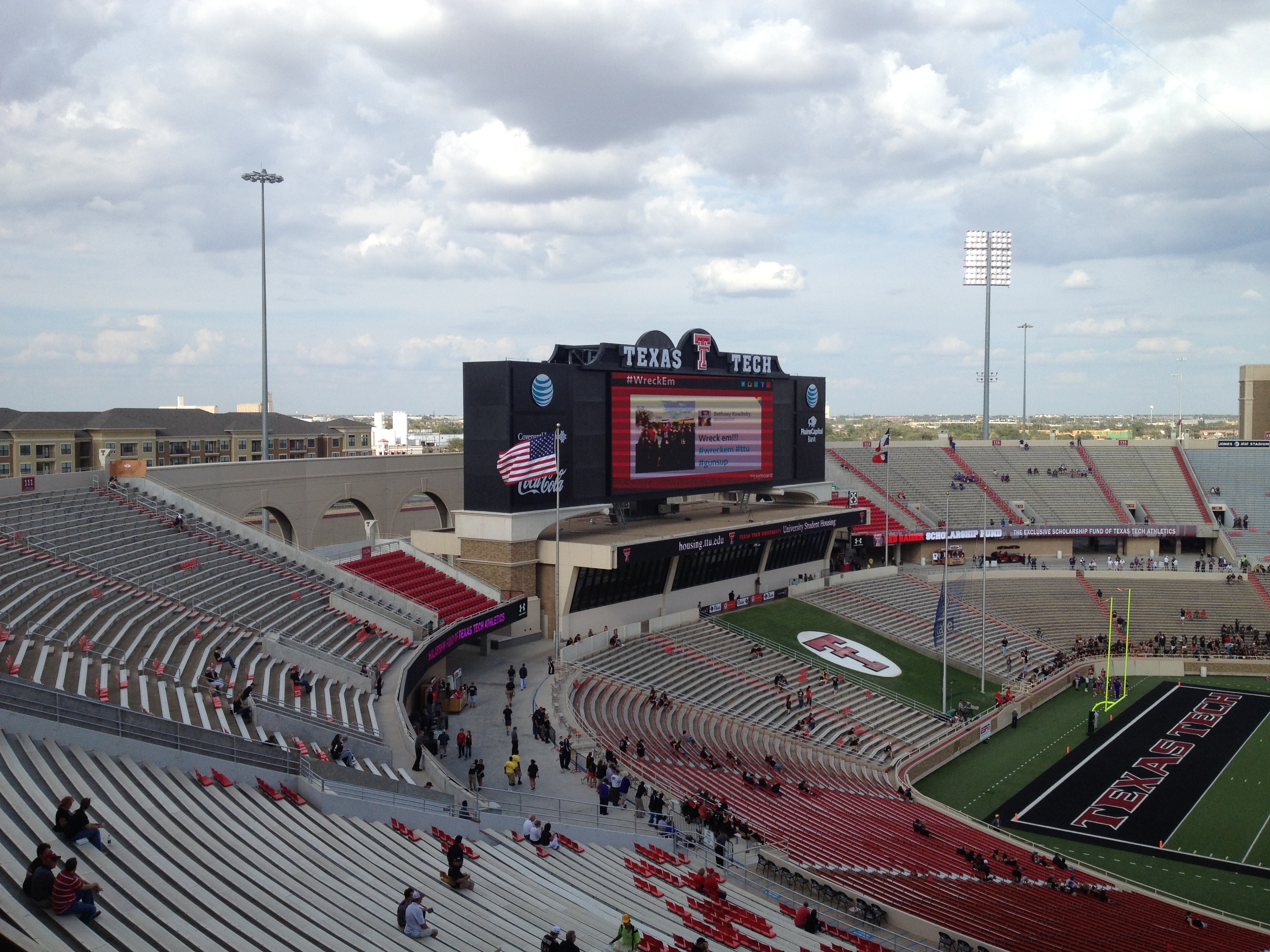
View of the video board and north end zone renovations at Jones AT&T Stadium completed in 2013

Due for completion prior to the commencement of the 2013 season, the $11 million jumbotron mounted in the north end zone of the stadium is one of the largest in the country. The high-definition jumbotron measures 100 feet wide by 38 feet tall with 3,800 square feet (350 m^{2}) of screen space, placing it at a ranking of 16th nationally by square footage in purely NCAA football stadiums, and 8th among HD screens. Additionally, the board ranks fifth in the Big 12 Conference in square footage behind Utan's Rice–Eccles Stadium, Houston's TDECU Stadium, West Virginia's Milan Puskar Stadium, UCF's Acrisure Bounce House, and Baylor University's McLane Stadium.

The entire support structure measures 190 feet wide and 57 feet tall, making it the largest overall in the Big 12. The entire project includes 275 tons of steel above ground and 54 tons below ground, embedded in about 400 cubic yards (310 m^{3}) of concrete. Six piers on each side of the structure plunge to a depth of near 50 feet (15 m). The video board, with a pixel pitch of 16mm and 4 megapixels, also includes sound banks 38 feet tall and 16 feet wide. The video board supports were covered with a decorative Spanish Renaissance architecture facade and feature wells for shooting pyrotechnics.

== Usage ==
=== Coaches All-America Game ===
The Coaches All-America Game, a postseason college football all-star game that served as the concluding game of the college football season, was hosted at Jones AT&T Stadium from 1970–1975. The all-star game was sponsored by the American Football Coaches Association (AFCA) and profits from ticket sales and television rights went to fund AFCA scholarships. Prior to the Coaches All-America Game relocating to Lubbock, from 1961 to 1965, War Memorial Stadium in Buffalo, New York, served as host and prior to relocating to Lubbock due to attendance issues, Atlanta Stadium hosted the game from 1966 to 1969. Lubbock won the bid to host the game over newer stadiums in larger cities, Memorial Stadium in Memphis, Tennessee and San Diego Stadium in San Diego, after the AFCA was convinced that Lubbock's advantages as a college town without competing entertainment would fill the stands with existing college football fans from West Texas.

The first game held at Jones Stadium took place only 47 days after downtown Lubbock was hit by a tornado in 1970. The stadium's newly installed AstroTurf was unharmed, but some of the light towers on the east side—which had recently been fitted with extra lights for the color telecast of the All-America Game—were bent or snapped off. Even with the surrounding circumstances, the inaugural Jones Stadium game drew 42,150 in attendance, a record attendance that broke set in any prior Coaches All-America Game in Buffalo or Atlanta. The game finally found success by an attendance standard, drawing 285,786 attendees over 7 years. By the time of the final Coaches All-America Game in 1976, more players declined to participate in the all-star game as rookies and NFL owners had little to gain, and much to lose due to injury risks. The AFCA reluctantly dropped the Coaches All-America Game, but continued to bestow All-America honors.

=== Texas Tech Red Raiders ===
Neither the biggest nor the loudest, Jones Stadium and its crowd helped the Raiders pull off recent upsets of Texas and Oklahoma.

— Dave Curtis of Sporting News

The Texas Tech Red Raiders played their first game in Jones AT&T Stadium on November 29, 1947—a 14–6 win against the Hardin–Simmons Cowboys. The Red Raiders have a posted a 336-162-13 (.670) record at Jones AT&T Stadium through the 2013 victory over Iowa State. Dave Curtis, a writer for Sporting News listed the stadium as having the number one ranking amongst college stadiums in home field advantage. The attendance record of 61,836 was set during the 2013 season against the Oklahoma State Cowboys. The 2012 Texas Tech Red Raiders football team set a season average attendance record of 57,108, breaking the record set previously in 2010. A 34-27 win over the Oklahoma Sooners on November 17, 2007, was the start of a 12-game winning streak, the longest Red Raider winning streak at Jones AT&T Stadium that lasted through October 24, 2009, with a 52-30 loss to Texas A&M. Texas Tech has gone undefeated at Jones AT&T Stadium in 14 seasons, with the most recent coming in 2005 and 2008.

== Attendance and student section ==
A student attendance record of 16,092 was set on September 12, 2013 against Texas Christian University, breaking the record 14,915 set just one week earlier. The increased demand for student seating in 2013 led to Texas Tech allocating additional sections for the purpose, which contributed to the setting of a total yearly student attendance record in addition to the individual game records. Since 2009, Texas Tech has seen a 25 percent increase in the student attendance average, bucking a national trend of declining attendance. The student section has been named as the best such section in the Big 12 Conference by ESPN and The Norman Transcript.

As of April 2014, there were 34,100 season tickets sold for the 2014 season, surpassing the previous season ticket record of 32,227 that were purchased prior to the start of the 2010 season. In July 2014, the athletic department announced that all season tickets had sold out for the first time in school history with a record 38,502 tickets sold.

The 10 highest overall attendance records for Texas Tech football games at Jones AT&T Stadium:

Attendance	Opponent	Season	TTU Result
61,836	Oklahoma State Cowboys	2013	L, 34–52
61,283	TCU Horned Frogs	2015	L, 52–55
60,997	Texas State Bobcats	2013	W, 33–7
60,975	Texas Longhorns	2022	W, 37-34 OT
60,961	Texas Longhorns	2014	L, 13-34
60,901	Oklahoma State Cowboys	2017	L, 34-41
60,879	Texas Longhorns	2012	L, 22-31
60,803	Texas Longhorns	2016	L, 37-45
60,800	Oklahoma Sooners	2012	L, 20-41
60,778	Central Arkansas Bears	2014	W, 42-35

== Gallery ==
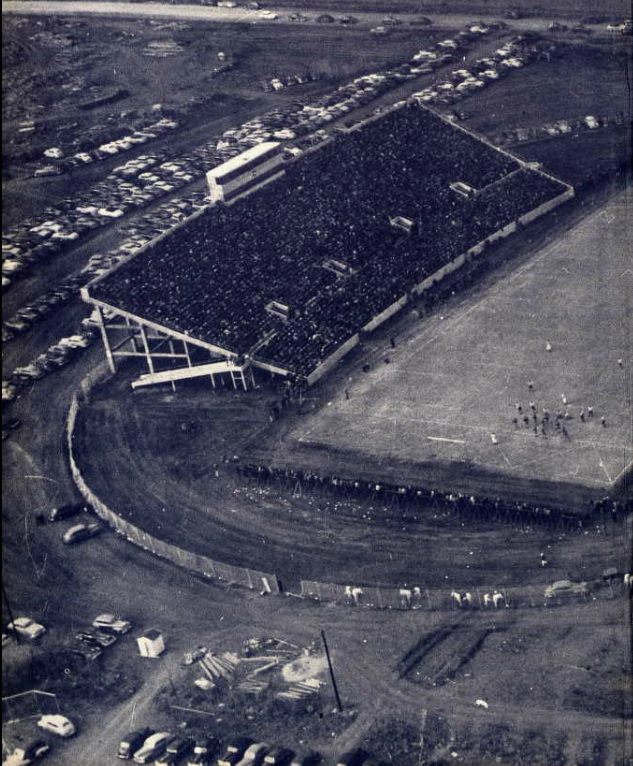
Clifford B. and Audrey Jones Stadium circa 1948

== See also ==
- List of NCAA Division I FBS football stadiums
- List of American football stadiums by capacity
- Lists of stadiums
