= January 1948 =

Month of 1948

<<	January 1948					>>
Su	Mo	Tu	We	Th	Fr	Sa
				1	2	3
4	5	6	7	8	9	10
11	12	13	14	15	16	17
18	19	20	21	22	23	24
25	26	27	28	29	30	31

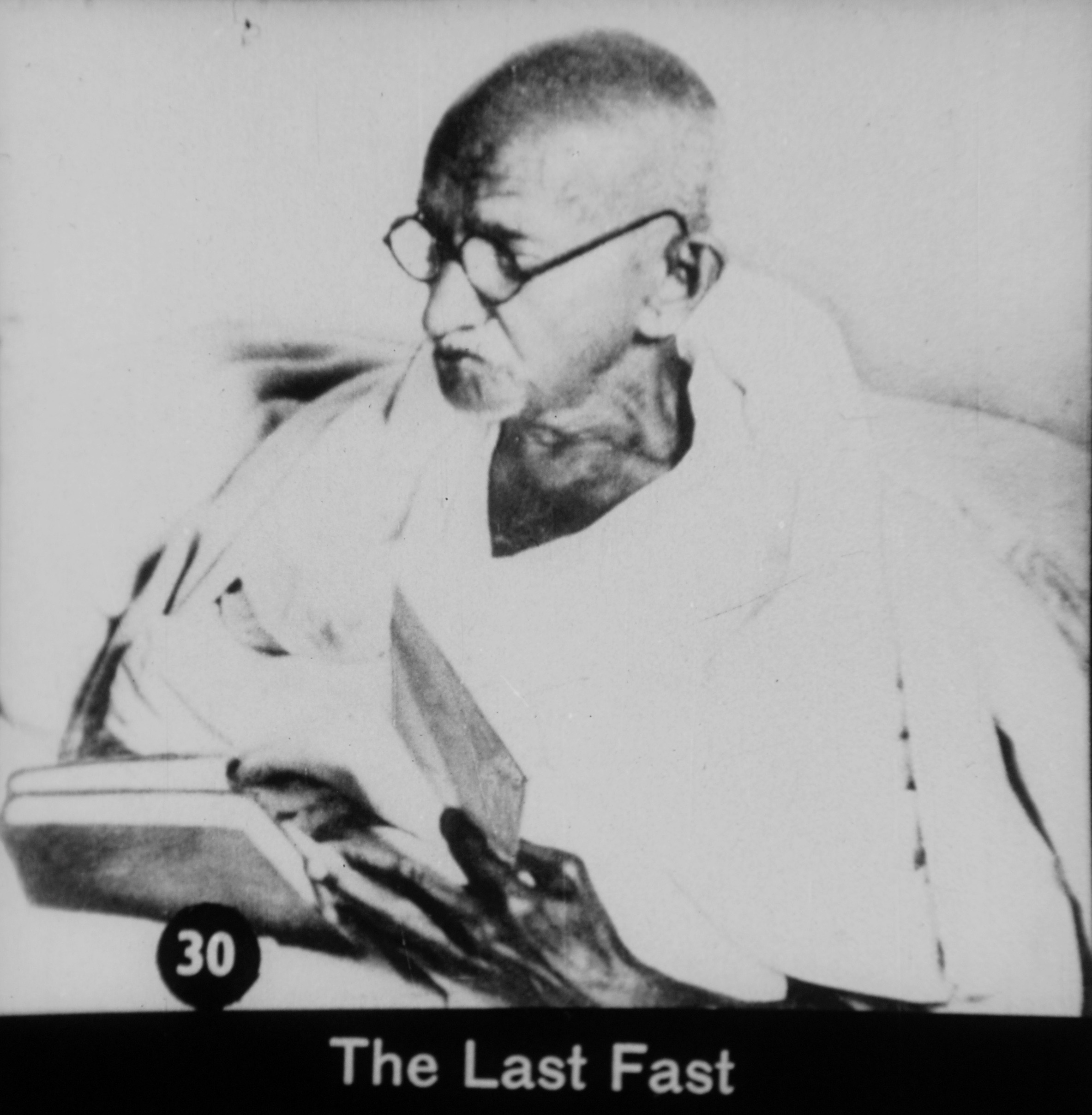
January 30, 1948: The Mahatma Mohandas K. Gandhi, leader of the independence movement of India, is assassinated.

January 4, 1948: The Union of Burma (now Myanmar) is granted independence from the British Empire.

The following events occurred in January 1948:

== January 1, 1948 (Thursday) ==
- Nationalization of railways in Great Britain took effect under the Transport Act 1947. This has caused the Big four railway companies (LMS, LNER, GWR, SR) to become British Railways.
- The General Agreement on Tariffs and Trade (GATT) came into effect.
- A nationwide ban on music recording took effect in the United States by order of American Federation of Musicians President James Petrillo. The ban was aimed at a provision in the Taft-Hartley Act which criminalized a union's collection of money directly from employers "for services that are not performed or not to be performed," which made the AFM's recording fund to support unemployed musicians illegal.
- King George VI bestowed the 1948 New Year Honours.
- In college bowl games across the United States, the Michigan Wolverines shut out the USC Trojans 49-0 in the Rose Bowl, the Georgia Tech Yellow Jackets beat the Kansas Jayhawks 20-14 in the Orange Bowl, the Miami (Ohio) Redskins edged the Texas Tech Red Raiders in the Sun Bowl and the Texas Longhorns defeated the Alabama Crimson Tide 27-7 in the Sugar Bowl, while the Cotton Bowl Classic ended in a 13-13 tie between the Penn State Nittany Lions and SMU Mustangs.
- Born: Ismael "El Mayo" Zambada, Mexican drug lord; in El Álamo, Mexico
- Died: Edna May, 69, American actress and singer

== January 2, 1948 (Friday) ==
- Indian Prime Minister Jawaharlal Nehru threatened to invade Pakistan to stop Muslim attacks in Kashmir.
- The government of Yugoslavia sent a note to the United States demanding the release of $60–70 million worth of Yugoslav funds which had been deposited with the Federal Reserve Bank in New York prior to the German invasion in 1941. Washington had frozen these assets pending the settlement of various debts and claims.
- The Gongzhutun Campaign began in the Chinese Civil War.
- White House Press Secretary Charlie Ross unveiled plans to add a second-floor balcony to the White House at a projected cost of $15,000. The idea would prove to be controversial, as the White House mail room would soon be flooded with protest letters demanding that the historic building be left unaltered.
- Born: Judith Miller, journalist, in New York City; Joyce Wadler, journalist, in the United States; Deborah Watling, actress, in Loughton, England (d. 2017)
- Died: Vicente Huidobro, 54, Chilean poet

== January 3, 1948 (Saturday) ==
- British Prime Minister Clement Attlee made his strongest and most specific attack on communism to date when he declared that "today in eastern Europe the Communist Party, while overthrowing the economic tyranny of landlordism and capitalism, has renounced the doctrines of individual freedom and political democracy and rejected the whole spiritual heritage of western Europe."
- A large TNT shipment bound for Palestine was seized at Jersey City, New Jersey after a box fraudulently marked as industrial machinery was accidentally dropped. Police said there was little doubt that the explosives were intended for use in the Jewish-Arab conflict in Palestine.

== January 4, 1948 (Sunday) ==
- Burma formally gained independence from the United Kingdom. Sao Shwe Thaik became the country's first president and U Nu its first prime minister.
- The Al-Wathbah uprising began in Iraq when students from al-Karkh and Al-Adhamiyah secondary schools went on a march in protest of a statement attributed to foreign minister Muhammad Fadhel al-Jamali suggesting that the monarchy may renew the Anglo- Iraqi Treaty of 1930. Many students were wounded when the police attempted to break up the protest.
- An Irgun car bomb blew up a government complex in Jaffa, killing 26 Arabs.

== January 5, 1948 (Monday) ==
- The Interim Committee of the United Nations General Assembly held its opening session and elected Luis Padilla Nervo of Mexico as its chairman.
- Semiramis Hotel bombing: Members of Haganah blew up a hotel in west Jerusalem, killing 24-26 civilians.
- Sexual Behavior in the Human Male by Dr. Alfred Kinsey was published. This landmark book about human sexuality, together with 1953's Sexual Behavior in the Human Female, are commonly referred to as the Kinsey Report.
- The novel Raintree County by Ross Lockridge Jr. was published.
- Born: Wally Foreman, sports administrator and commentator, in Kalgoorlie, Australia (d. 2006); Charlie Hough, baseball player, in Honolulu, Hawaii; Ted Lange, actor and director, in Oakland, California
- Died: Mary Dimmick Harrison, 89, second wife of U.S. President Benjamin Harrison

== January 6, 1948 (Tuesday) ==
- The Ministries Trial began in Nuremberg. Twenty-one officials of various ministries of the Third Reich went on trial, facing an assortment of charges for their roles in atrocities committed by the Nazis.
- The adventure drama film The Treasure of the Sierra Madre starring Humphrey Bogart was released.

== January 7, 1948 (Wednesday) ==
- U.S. President Harry S. Truman delivered the annual State of the Union address to Congress. Truman outlined five goals for the future: " to secure fully the essential human rights of our citizens," "to protect and develop our human resources," "to conserve and use our natural resources so that they can contribute most effectively to the welfare of our people," "to lift the standard of living for all our people by strengthening our economic system and sharing more broadly among our people the goods we produce," and "to achieve world peace based on principles of freedom and justice and the equality of all nations."
- An Irgun bomb attack at the Jaffa Gate in Jerusalem killed 25 Arabs.
- The Gongzhutun Campaign ended in Communist victory.
- Mantell UFO incident: Kentucky Air National Guard pilot Thomas F. Mantell died in the crash of his F-51 Mustang fighter plane after being sent in pursuit of an unidentified flying object.
- Born: Shobhaa De, columnist and novelist, in Satara, India; Kenny Loggins, singer-songwriter, in Everett, Washington; Ichirou Mizuki, musician and actor, in Tokyo (d. 2022)

== January 8, 1948 (Thursday) ==
- German officials accepted a US-British offer to assume responsibility for a new economic government in the Bizone, to be called the Bizonal Economic Administration.
- U.S. Secretary of State George Marshall appeared before the Senate to make the case for Truman's request for $6.8 billion to cover the first 15 months of the Marshall Plan, warning that U.S. failure to help rebuild Europe's economy would turn the continent into "the dictatorship of police states."
- Died: Edward Stanley Kellogg, 77, United States Navy Captain and 16th Governor of American Samoa; Kurt Schwitters, 60, German artist

== January 9, 1948 (Friday) ==
- A record Chinese budget of 96 trillion yuan (about $427 million US) for the first six months of 1948 was announced in Nanjing.
- The U.S. Navy Department announced the transfer of four large submarines and eleven other naval vessels to Turkey and six submarines to Greece.

== January 10, 1948 (Saturday) ==
- The U.S. State Department designated radar equipment as "arms" so it could not be exported without a license after concerns were raised that some such equipment was going to the Soviet Union and its satellite states.
- Born: Donald Fagen, musician (Steely Dan), in Passaic, New Jersey; Teresa Graves, actress and singer, in Houston, Texas (d. 2002); Mischa Maisky, cellist, in Riga, Latvian SSR

== January 11, 1948 (Sunday) ==
- The acting president of the American University of Beirut announced the development of the most complete and effective cholera serum known to science.
- Born: Larry Harvey, artist, activist and co-founder of the Burning Man event, in San Francisco, California (d. 2018); Danne Larsson, Swedish musician

== January 12, 1948 (Monday) ==
- President Truman presented Congress with a $39.7 billion budget, the second-largest in peacetime history.
- The U.S. Supreme Court decided Sipuel v. Board of Regents of the University of Oklahoma, ruling that black students were entitled to the same education as whites.
- Born: Kenny Allen, footballer, in Thornaby-on-Tees, England; Anthony Andrews, actor, in Finchley, London, England

== January 13, 1948 (Tuesday) ==
- Fistfights broke out in the French National Assembly. The Communists broke up the session by shouting and fighting in the aisles after the Assembly rejected their demand that Jacques Duclos be re-elected first vice-president.
- The Mahatma Gandhi began fasting for a "reunion of hearts" between the Muslims, Hindus and Sikhs of India.
- Died: Solomon Mikhoels, 57, Soviet Jewish actor and director of the Moscow State Jewish Theater (assassinated on the orders of Joseph Stalin in a hit-and-run car crash)

== January 14, 1948 (Wednesday) ==
- U.S. Secretary of State Marshall rejected Yugoslavia's request for the return of its funds until all outstanding claims were settled, including the concern of the two American planes shot down over Yugoslavia in August 1946.
- The Battle of 3 Shevat was fought when Arab forces attacked Gush Etzion but were repulsed with heavy casualties.
- The American Communist Party held two rallies in New York City to mark the twenty-fourth anniversary of Vladimir Lenin's death. National chairman William Z. Foster hailed the presidential candidacy of Henry A. Wallace, telling his followers that millions of Americans believe that "the Wallace movement is the one movement that has the possibility to put a halt to this drive to a new war." A combined total of about 5,000 people attended the two rallies.
- Born: T Bone Burnett, music producer and guitarist, as Joseph Burnett III in St. Louis, Missouri; Valeri Kharlamov, ice hockey player, in Moscow, USSR (d. 1981); Muhriz of Negeri Sembilan, eleventh Yamtuan Besar of Negeri Sembilan, in Kuala Pilah, Malayan Union; Carl Weathers, actor and football player, in New Orleans, Louisiana
- The Treasure of the Sierra Madre (film) premieres in Los Angeles, California

== January 15, 1948 (Thursday) ==
- A spokesman for the Arab League in Cairo said that regular armies of the Arab countries would occupy all of Palestine as soon as the British withdrew, and that any intervention by an international police force or large contingent of foreign troops "will be considered an unfriendly act by the Arab states, and the Council of the League, which is always in session, will take steps to meet the emergency."
- General Hoyt S. Vandenberg, Vice Chief of Staff, United States Air Force, approved a policy calling for the development of earth satellites at the proper time.
- Born: Ronnie Van Zant, singer and founding member of the rock band Lynyrd Skynyrd, in Jacksonville, Florida (d. 1977)
- Died: Josephus Daniels, 85, American newspaper editor and publisher and United States Secretary of the Navy during World War I

== January 16, 1948 (Friday) ==
- Bulgarian leader Georgi Dimitrov signed a pact of mutual assistance with Romania. Speaking before several hundred thousand in Victory Square in Bucharest, Dimitrov made reference to the civil war in Greece as he declared, "We united our forces today not as aggressors but to protect our people from a new fire that may be kindled there and spread to our countries."
- 1947–48 Civil War in Mandatory Palestine: Jerusalem was shaken just after midnight by a massive explosion on the roof of a food store near the Western Wall. Later in the day in Haifa, seven Arab children were killed when a house was blown up by Haganah.
- The Convoy of 35, a convoy of Haganah fighters sent on foot to resupply the blockaded kibbutzism of Gush Etzion, was destroyed by Arab villagers and militiamen.
- New York Governor and failed 1944 Republican presidential candidate Thomas E. Dewey formally entered the race for the Republican nomination for president, announcing through an aide that he "cannot actively seek the nomination of his party for President, but if nominated he would accept."
- The film noir I Walk Alone starring Burt Lancaster, Lizabeth Scott and Kirk Douglas was released.
- Born: John Carpenter, filmmaker, in Carthage, New York; Gregor Gysi, attorney and politician, in East Berlin, Germany; Cliff Thorburn, professional snooker player, in Victoria, British Columbia, Canada; Tsuneo Horiuchi, baseball player, in Kōfu, Japan

== January 17, 1948 (Saturday) ==
- Renville Agreement: A UN-brokered ceasefire in the Indonesian conflict was signed between Dutch and Indonesian representatives aboard the U.S. Navy transport ship Renville off the Java coast.
- Manchester United got the fourth highest home attendance recorded in English football.
- Born: Davíð Oddsson, 21st Prime Minister of Iceland, in Reykjavík;

== January 18, 1948 (Sunday) ==
- The Mahatma Gandhi ended his five-day fast after leaders of the Hindu, Sikh and Muslim communities presented a pledge signed by 200,000 persons promising peace. "If today's solemn pledge is fulfilled," Gandhi said, "it will revive with doubled force my intense wish to live a full span of life doing service to humanity." Gandhi said that by a full span he meant "at least 125 years, or as some say 133 years."
- Born: M. C. Gainey, actor, in Jackson, Mississippi

== January 19, 1948 (Monday) ==
- About 150 people drowned when the steamship Cautin sank near Puerto Saavedra, Chile.
- The U.S. Supreme Court decided Oyama v. California, ruling that Fred Oyama, an American citizen of Japanese descent, owned land in California purchased by his Japanese father despite the state's Alien Land Law.
- The novel Other Voices, Other Rooms by Truman Capote was published.
- Born: Frank McKenna, businessman, politician and diplomat, in Apohaqui, New Brunswick; Michael J. Jackson, actor, in Liverpool, England; Mal Reilly, English rugby league footballer

== January 20, 1948 (Tuesday) ==
- The UN Security Council voted 9–0 to establish a three-member commission to mediate the Indo-Pakistani dispute over Kashmir.
- Republican politician John Foster Dulles accused the Soviet Union of trying "by every art short of war" to ruin Europe. Dulles urged Congress to set up a European aid plan that would bind western Europe into a mutual defense pact to contain the Soviets.
- William Lyon Mackenzie King announced that he would retire as Prime Minister of Canada after the Liberal Party held a national convention in the summer to select a new leader.

== January 21, 1948 (Wednesday) ==
- First Lord of the Admiralty Viscount Hall announced the scrapping of the battleships Queen Elizabeth, Valiant, Nelson and Rodney and the battlecruiser Renown. Hall said at the press conference that even if the British government could afford to keep the five big ships that "they would be of very little value in any future war."
- The flag of Quebec became the first provincial flag to be officially adopted in Canada.
- Born: M. R. S. Rao, scientist, in Mysore, India (d. 2023)
- Died: Ermanno Wolf-Ferrari, 72, Italian composer and teacher; Gertrude Bustill Mossell, 92, African-American journalist, author, teacher and activist

== January 22, 1948 (Thursday) ==
- The Congress of Industrial Organizations voted 33-11 in favor of a resolution declaring it "politically unwise to inject a third party into the political scene in 1948."
- The historical drama film Anna Karenina starring Vivien Leigh premiered in London.
- Died: Ludwig Plagge, 37, German SS officer (hanged for crimes against humanity)

== January 23, 1948 (Friday) ==
- Dwight D. Eisenhower definitively renounced any attempt to draft him to run for president by publicizing a letter declaring that he could not accept the nomination "even under the remote circumstances that it were tendered me."
- Soviet Deputy Foreign Minister Andrei Gromyko sent a note informing the United Nations that its Korea commission would not be allowed to enter the Soviet-controlled zone of Korea.
- Born: Katharine Holabird, author, in Cambridge, Massachusetts; Mitoji Yabunaka, politician, in Japan

== January 24, 1948 (Saturday) ==
- Hungary and Romania signed a 20-year friendship and military treaty.
- Died: Bill Cody, 57, American Western film actor; Charles Dudley Rhodes, 82, United States Army Major General

== January 25, 1948 (Sunday) ==
- The Lady Caycay earthquake struck Panay Island in the Philippines, causing an estimated 50 casualties.
- The French government announced that it would devalue the franc, revising the exchange rate from 119 francs to the US dollar to 214.392, and allow free market trading in gold. The announcement came over the formal objection of the International Monetary Fund whose statutes forbade any member country to "engage in multiple-currency practices" without the authorization of the Fund.

== January 26, 1948 (Monday) ==
- An international manpower conference opened in Rome with representatives of sixteen countries participating in the Marshall Plan. The main issue under consideration was that of redistributing manpower from countries that had an excess of workers to countries that had a shortage.
- At a branch of Imperial Bank in Tokyo, a man masquerading as a doctor fatally poisoned 12 bank employees and then robbed the bank of all the money he could find. Tempera painter Sadamichi Hirasawa was later arrested and charged with the crime, but was never executed because of doubts about his guilt.
- Poland and the Soviet Union signed a trade agreement worth more than $1 billion US.
- Died: Georg Bruchmüller, 84, German artillery officer

== January 27, 1948 (Tuesday) ==
- The cabinet of Iraqi Prime Minister Salih Jabr resigned after 24 hours of rioting over a British-Iraqi treaty of friendship and mutual military aid that had yet to be ratified. 70 people were reported killed and 300 wounded in the rioting.
- The Norwegian reefer ship Argo with the crew of twelve, transporting tomatoes from Venice to Rijeka, struck a WW2 mine south of the Cape Crna Punta south of Skitača just before 12:30 local time and sank; the only survivor, 25-year-old Nils Mikalsen Hovland, managed to swim to the Vošćice cove east of Koromačno.
- Born: Mikhail Baryshnikov, dancer, choreographer and actor, in Riga, Latvian SSR

== January 28, 1948 (Wednesday) ==
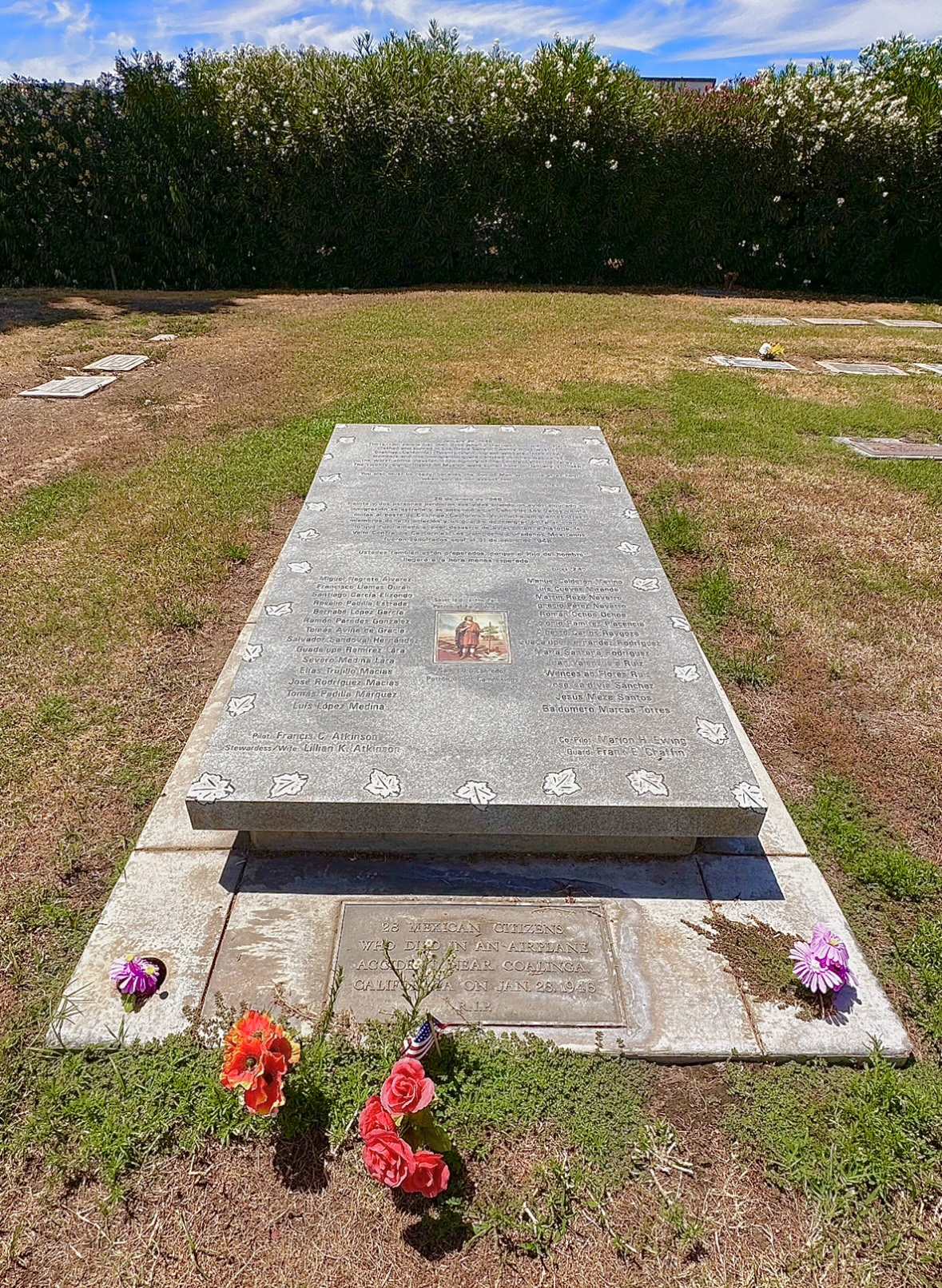
Graveside of the victims who were killed in the incident

- 1948 Los Gatos DC-3 crash: A Douglas DC-3 crashed in the Diablo Range west of Coalinga, California. All 29 passengers, mostly Mexican farm workers, and 3 crew were killed. The crash would later be commemorated in the Woody Guthrie protest song "Deportee (Plane Wreck at Los Gatos)".
- The 400-ton Japanese freighter Joo Maru struck a mine in the Inland Sea and sank. As many as 316 of the 425 persons aboard were believed drowned.
- Born: Charles Taylor, 22nd President of Liberia, in Arthington, Liberia

== January 29, 1948 (Thursday) ==
- Mohammad Hatta became 3rd Prime Minister of Indonesia after Amir Sjarifuddin resigned following a backlash over the Renville Agreement.
- The Pakistan Socialist Party was founded in Karachi.
- Muhammad as-Sadr became the new Prime Minister of Iraq.
- Born: Marc Singer, actor, in Vancouver, British Columbia
- Died: Prince Aimone, Duke of Aosta, 47

== January 30, 1948 (Friday) ==
- At 5:17 p.m. Indian Standard Time, The Mahatma Mohandas K. Gandhi was assassinated by Nathuram Godse on the steps of the Birla House in New Delhi.
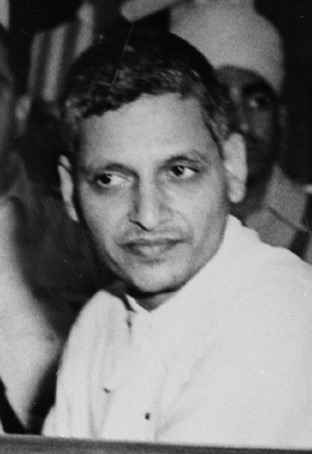
  The assassin of Gandhi
- The 1948 Winter Olympics, the first to be held after World War II, opened in St. Moritz, Switzerland.
- BSAA Star Tiger disappearance: An Avro Tudor of British South American Airways disappeared while flying from the Azores to Bermuda with 31 on board. Speculation about what happened to the flight helped develop the legend of the Bermuda Triangle.
- Born: Paul Magee, Provisional Irish Republican Army member, in Belfast
- Died:
  - The Mahatma Gandhi, 78, Indian independence leader (assassinated)
  - Herb Pennock, 53, American baseball player (cerebral hemorrhage);
  - Orville Wright, 76, American inventor and aviation pioneer
  - Nigel De Brulier, 70, English film actor; Arthur Coningham, 53, Australian RAF officer (presumed dead in the Star Tiger disappearance)

== January 31, 1948 (Saturday) ==
- Gandhi's body was carried in a five-hour procession through the streets of Delhi to the bank of the Jumna River where it was cremated on a funeral pyre of sandalwood logs strewn with flowers. An estimated one million Indians witnessed the procession and cremation ceremony.
- Soviet finance minister Arseny Zverev presented a record budget to a joint session of the Supreme Soviet, estimating revenue at 428 billion rubles and expenditure at 387.9 billion rubles in 1948.
- Born: Paul Jabara, actor, singer and songwriter, in Brooklyn, New York (d. 1992); Muneo Suzuki, politician, in Ashoro, Hokkaido, Japan
- Died: John T. Daniels, 74, American amateur photographer who took the photograph of the Wright brothers' first flight
