= December 1947 =

Month of 1947

<<	December 1947					>>
Su	Mo	Tu	We	Th	Fr	Sa
	1	2	3	4	5	6
7	8	9	10	11	12	13
14	15	16	17	18	19	20
21	22	23	24	25	26	27
28	29	30	31

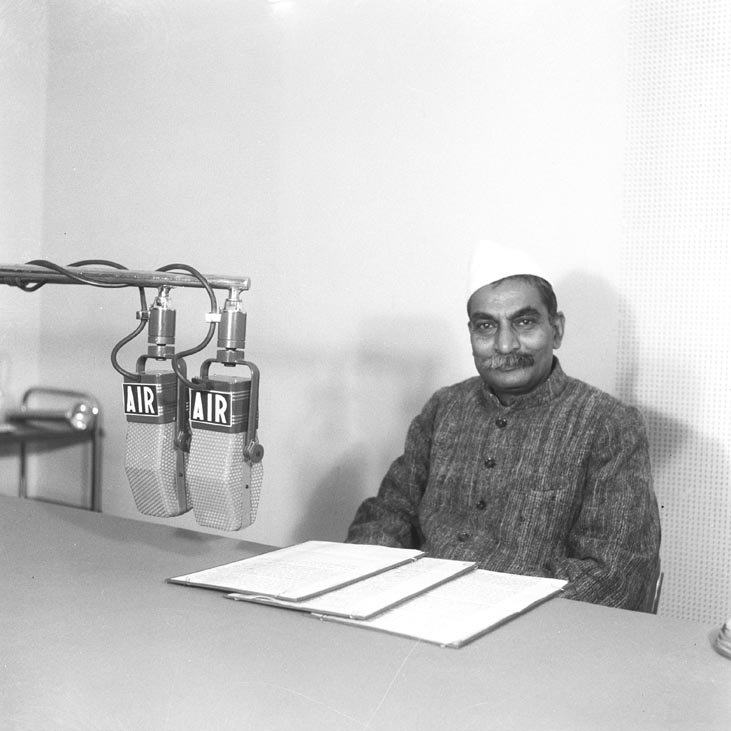
Indian politician Rajendra Prasad during a radio broadcast in December, 1947.

The following events occurred in December 1947:

== December 1, 1947 (Monday) ==
- With 60 percent of France's production tied up by strikes, a thirty-three hour filibuster waged by the Communists to prevent a vote in the National Assembly on Prime Minister Robert Schuman's anti-strike bill came to a head at 11 p.m. when Communist Deputy Raoul Calas disobeyed an order to leave the tribune and other Communists massed around him to prevent his ejection. The sit-down strike finally ended at 6 a.m. the next morning when the Communists got up and marched out just as forty Republican Guards entered the chamber to eject them by force.
- University of Notre Dame quarterback Johnny Lujack was named the winner of the Heisman Trophy.
- Born: Bob Fulton, Australian rugby league footballer, in Warrington, England (d. 2021)
- Died: Aleister Crowley, 72, English occultist; G. H. Hardy, 70, English mathematician

== December 2, 1947 (Tuesday) ==
- 1947 Aden riots: A peaceful protest by Arabs in Yemen Aden Protectorate against the United Nations vote on Palestine descended into rioting. 20 Jews and 15 Arabs were killed.
- The ruling body of Al-Azhar University in Cairo called on the Muslim world to proclaim jihad against the proposed partition of Palestine.
- Born: Isaac Bitton, musician, in Casablanca, Morocco

== December 3, 1947 (Wednesday) ==
- 16 were killed and about 30 injured in a train derailment in Arras, France. Authorities reported that the disaster was an act of sabotage and accused communists of being responsible in the midst of the country's ongoing labor strife.
- The Motion Picture Association of America voted for stronger regulations to prevent glorification of crime on the screen, while the Screen Directors Guild barred communists from holding office.
- The Tennessee Williams play A Streetcar Named Desire starring Jessica Tandy and rising star Marlon Brando premiered at the Ethel Barrymore Theatre on Broadway.

== December 4, 1947 (Thursday) ==
- The Judges' Trial ended in Nuremberg. 10 of the 15 German jurists and lawyers on trial were found guilty of Nazi war crimes and given prison sentences of varying lengths, including life for four of them.
- The Egyptian government banned public demonstrations in Cairo after police clashed with 15,000 marchers protesting against the partition of Palestine.
- Died: Jesse B. Jackson, 76, United States consul and eyewitness to the Armenian genocide

== December 5, 1947 (Friday) ==
- More rioting between Arabs and Jews in Aden killed 75 people.
- A federal grand jury in Washington indicted The Hollywood Ten for contempt of Congress for refusing to tell the House Un-American Activities Committee whether or not they were Communists.

== December 6, 1947 (Saturday) ==
- The University of Cambridge voted to accept women for the first time.
- Leo Durocher was reinstated as manager of the Brooklyn Dodgers after serving his one-season suspension.

== December 7, 1947 (Sunday) ==
- A drastic new anti-strike law went into effect in France, raising the maximum penalty for sabotage from six months to ten years in jail, and providing five year sentences for anyone convicted of using fraud or violence to disrupt freedom of work. That night the Interior Ministry reported that nearly 1,000 arrests had been made.
- Born: Johnny Bench, baseball player, in Oklahoma City, Oklahoma; Wendy Padbury, actress, in Warwickshire, England; Garry Unger, ice hockey player, in Calgary, Canada
- Died: Tristan Bernard, 81, French playwright, novelist, journalist and lawyer; Nicholas Murray Butler, 85, American philosopher, diplomat, Nobel laureate and 12th president of Columbia University; Charles McGuinness, 54, Irish adventurer, author and sailor

== December 8, 1947 (Monday) ==
- The Krupp Trial began in Nuremberg. Twelve former directors of the Krupp Group stood accused of having actively participated in the Nazis' plans for a war of aggression as well as for having used slave labor.
- The US Supreme Court decided Patton v. Mississippi, ordering a new trial for Eddie Patton, an African-American on death row in Mississippi. The 9–0 decision found that blacks had been excluded from the jury that convicted Patton of killing a white man.
- Nations of the Arab League meeting in Cairo promised "immediate measures" to help Palestinian Arabs resist partition.
- Born: Gérard Blanc, singer, guitarist and actor, in France (d. 2019); Thomas Cech, chemist and Nobel laureate, in Chicago, Illinois

== December 9, 1947 (Tuesday) ==
- Royal Netherlands East Indies Army forces committed the Rawagede massacre in West Java, killing an estimated 431 civilian men in the village of Rawagede because the inhabitants would not tell where the Indonesian independence fighter Lukas Kustario was hiding.
- The Western Tai'an Campaign began during the Chinese Civil War.
- The romantic comedy film The Bishop's Wife starring Cary Grant, Loretta Young and David Niven premiered in New York City.
- Born: Tom Daschle, politician, in Aberdeen, South Dakota
- Died: Hanns Ludin, 42, Nazi SA general and diplomat; Hermann Höfle, 49, Nazi SS general. Both hanged in Bratislava for war crimes.

== December 10, 1947 (Wednesday) ==
- The 1947 Nobel Prizes were given out in Stockholm. The recipients were Edward Victor Appleton (United Kingdom) for Physics, Robert Robinson (United Kingdom) for Chemistry, Carl Ferdinand Cori (United States), Gerty Cori (United States) and Bernardo Houssay (Argentina) for Medicine and André Gide (France) for Literature. In Oslo, the Friends Service Council (United Kingdom) and American Friends Service Committee (United States) were awarded the Nobel Peace Prize on behalf of the Religious Society of Friends.
- Labour leaders in Rome called for a general strike to begin at midnight after the government did not respond to an ultimatum containing various demands from the Communist-controlled Chamber of Labour.

== December 11, 1947 (Thursday) ==
- An estimated 500,000 workers participated in Rome's general strike. The Interior Ministry announced that 100 arrests had been made during clashes with Communists trying to keep workers from their jobs.
- Britain announced that it would end its mandate over Palestine on May 15.
- A reshuffle of the Bulgarian cabinet gave 13 of 23 ministerial posts to communists.

== December 12, 1947 (Friday) ==
- In Jerusalem, members of the Jewish underground killed six more Arabs and threw grenades at the office of the newspaper of the exiled Grand Mufti Amin al-Husseini.
- After a second day of violence in Rome in which 200 policemen clashed with 3,000 strikers, the Communist-led general strike ended at midnight, 48 hours after it began. The strikers and the government both claimed success.
- Born: Will Alsop, architect, in Northampton, England (d. 2018)

== December 13, 1947 (Saturday) ==
- Irgun bombs killed at least 16 people and injured 67 in Jerusalem and Jaffa.
- "Ballerina" by Vaughn Monroe and His Orchestra hit #1 on the Billboard Best Sellers in Stores record chart.
- Died: Nicholas Roerich, 73, Russian painter, archaeologist and philosopher

== December 14, 1947 (Sunday) ==
- Italy became the first of the defeated Axis countries to regain its sovereignty following a military occupation when the last American troops withdrew from the country in accordance with the terms of the Treaty of Peace with Italy.
- The Soviet government announced plans to fight inflation by issuing new currency and abolishing food rationing by December 16.
- Santiago Bernabéu Stadium opened in Madrid, Spain.
- Born:
  - Christopher Parkening, classical guitarist, in Los Angeles, California
  - John Mearsheimer, American political scientist and international relations scholar, in New York City
  - Dilma Rousseff, 36th president of Brazil, in Belo Horizonte, Brazil
- Died: Stanley Baldwin, 80, British Conservative politician and three-time prime minister of the United Kingdom; Edward Higgins, 83, 3rd General of the Salvation Army

== December 15, 1947 (Monday) ==
- The French-administered Saar Protectorate was established.
- The Soviet Union announced the withdrawal of its troops from Bulgaria in accordance with the terms of the Paris Peace Treaties.
- Died: Arthur Machen, 84, Welsh author and mystic

== December 16, 1947 (Tuesday) ==
- A Boeing B-29 Superfortress crashed minutes after taking off from the Davis–Monthan Air Force Base in Arizona. 12 of the 20 crew were killed.
- Born: Ben Cross, actor, in London, England (d. 2020); Vincent Matthews, Olympic gold medalist sprinter, in Queens, New York

== December 17, 1947 (Wednesday) ==
- Bulgaria and Albania concluded a friendship treaty obligating both to boycott the UN Balkan Commission.
- WEWS-TV, the first commercially licensed television station in Ohio, signed on in Cleveland.
- Died: Johannes Nicolaus Brønsted, 68, Danish physical chemist

== December 18, 1947 (Thursday) ==
- The Al-Khisas raid took place in Palestine.
- Pope Pius XII published the encyclical Optatissima pax, prescribing public prayers for social and world peace.
- Born: Leonid Yuzefovich, writer, in Moscow, USSR

== December 19, 1947 (Friday) ==
- President Truman asked Congress to approve a $17 billion four-year European recovery program in time to put it into effect by April 1 as part of the fight against "selfish totalitarian aggression."
- Just before midnight, a munitions storage explosion at Mitholz in Switzerland largely destroyed the village and killed nine.
- The 1948 NFL draft was held in Pittsburgh. The Washington Redskins selected halfback Harry Gilmer of the University of Alabama as the #1 overall pick.
- Born: Chris Jagger, musician and younger brother of Mick Jagger, in Dartford, England

== December 20, 1947 (Saturday) ==
- Italy was hit with a new wave of labor strife when 300,000 workers in flour mills and food-processing factories went on strike.
- On the 30th anniversary of the creation of the Cheka, newspaper editorials told Russian citizens that a foreign intelligence campaign had persisted for 40 years and that they should be on constant alert against "imperialist" threats.
- The Greek Liberty cargo steamship Kalliopi, sailing empty from Ancona to Rijeka, struck a WW2 mine at 07:40 local time in the Vela vrata strait and sank; one crew member died.

== December 21, 1947 (Sunday) ==
- Arab People's Army leader Fawzi al-Qawuqji stated the Arab plan to gain military control of Palestine and set up an all-Arab state.
- The first postwar elections of deputies to local Soviets was held in the Soviet Socialist Republics of Russia, Ukraine, Moldavia, Armenia and Karelia, with the Communist Party running unopposed.
- The Italian food workers' strike was called off after less than 48 hours when the workers won a promise of increased wages and severance pay.
- Born: Paco de Lucía, flamenco guitarist, in Algeciras, Spain (d. 2014)

== December 22, 1947 (Monday) ==
- The Constitution of Italy was enacted by the Constituent Assembly.
- Sentencing was handed down in the Flick Trial. German industrialist Friedrich Flick was found guilty of war crimes by the US military court at Nuremberg and sentenced to seven years in prison from the time of his arrest in August 1945. Two other defendants received shorter sentences and the remaining three were acquitted.
- 41 people were killed in a train accident between Niederlahnstein and Neuwied, Germany.
- Born: Mitsuo Tsukahara, Olympic gold medalist artistic gymnast, in Japan, Porfirio Lobo Sosa, 54th president of Honduras, in Trujillo, Honduras

== December 23, 1947 (Tuesday) ==
- President Truman signed a bill providing $522 million in stopgap relief for France, Italy and Austria, $18 million for China and $340 million for US occupational expenses.
- Acting on the advice of his three-man Amnesty Board, President Truman granted pardons to 1,523 men convicted during the war of violating the Selective Service Act. All but three had already finished serving their prison sentences.
- John Bardeen, Walter Brattain, and William Shockley create the first practically-implemented transistor.

== December 24, 1947 (Wednesday) ==
- The Communist Party of Greece proclaimed the Provisional Democratic Government with Markos Vafiadis as its leader.
- The Bulgarian National Assembly nationalized most mines and factories.
- The Orson Welles-directed film noir The Lady from Shanghai starring Welles, Rita Hayworth and Everett Sloane premiered in France.
- Died: C. C. Young, 78, American teacher, politician and 26th Governor of California

== December 25, 1947 (Thursday) ==
- The Constitution of the Republic of China went into effect.
- The North American blizzard of 1947 began. By the time it ended the following day, a total of 26.4 inches of snow was recorded at Central Park in Manhattan.
- The comedy film Road to Rio starring Bing Crosby, Bob Hope and Dorothy Lamour was released.
- Died: Gaspar G. Bacon, 61, Lieutenant Governor of Massachusetts from 1933 to 1935

== December 26, 1947 (Friday) ==
- Speaking in his own defense at his war crimes trial in Tokyo, former Japanese prime minister Hideki Tojo claimed that war was justified in 1941 because pressure from the United States and Britain had maneuvered Japan into firing the first shot "in self-defense." Tojo accepted responsibility for Japan's defeat but denied any "legal or criminal" responsibility.
- The Heard and McDonald Islands were transferred from Britain to Australia.
- Born: Carlton Fisk, baseball player, in Bellows Falls, Vermont

== December 27, 1947 (Saturday) ==
- 1947 Korangi Creek crash: An Air India Douglas DC-3 crashed shortly after takeoff from Karachi to Bombay, killing all 23 aboard.
- The first episode of Howdy Doody aired on the NBC television network while the show itself became a pioneer in the early days of children's television.
- Died: Johannes Winkler, 50, German rocket scientist

== December 28, 1947 (Sunday) ==
- The Chicago Cardinals beat the Philadelphia Eagles 28-21 in the 1947 NFL Championship Game at Comiskey Park in Chicago.
- Born: Mamphela Ramphele, politician and activist, in Bochum District, Transvaal, South Africa; Aurelio Rodríguez, baseball player, in Cananea, Mexico (d. 2000)
- Died: Victor Emmanuel III of Italy, 78, King of Italy from 1900 to 1946

== December 29, 1947 (Monday) ==
- Henry A. Wallace announced that he intended to run as a third-party candidate for president in 1948, pledging a "positive peace program of abundance and security, not scarcity and war."
- Born: Ted Danson, actor, in San Diego, California; Cozy Powell, rock drummer, in Cirencester, England (d. 1998)

== December 30, 1947 (Tuesday) ==
- King Michael I of Romania was forced to abdicate by the pro-Soviet government.
- The Haifa Oil Refinery massacre occurred in Palestine. 39 Jews and 6 Arabs were killed.
- The High Command Trial, the last of the twelve Nuremberg Trials, began. Thirteen German generals and one admiral stood accused of having participated in Nazi atrocities.
- Born:
  - Jeff Lynne, singer, songwriter, composer and record producer (Electric Light Orchestra, Traveling Wilburys), in Shard End, Birmingham, England
  - Janet Mills, American politician, 75th Governor of Maine (2019-present), in Farmington, Maine
- Died: Han van Meegeren, 58, Dutch painter and art forger

== December 31, 1947 (Wednesday) ==
- The Balad al-Shaykh massacre was perpetrated during the night of December 31—January 1. The Palmach, an arm of the Haganah, attacked the Palestinian Arab village of Balad al-Sheikh in retaliation for the Haifa Oil Refinery massacre. 17 were reported killed and 33 injured.
- Western film stars Roy Rogers and Dale Evans were married on a ranch in Davis, Oklahoma.
- Born: Burton Cummings, musician, singer and songwriter (The Guess Who), in Winnipeg, Canada; Tim Matheson, actor, director and producer, in Glendale, California
