= Battle of Roanoke Inlet =

American Revolution skirmish in North Carolina

Coordinates: 35.93°N 75.62°W

- Part of American Revolutionary War
Date	August 15, 1776
Location	Near Manteo, North Carolina
Result	Patriot victory

Belligerents
(Kingdom of Great Britain) Great Britain	(United States) Patriot militia

Commanders and leaders
Bernard Glass (WIA)(POW)	Dennis Dauge

Strength
25	Unknown

Casualties and losses
All killed or captured	None killed Unknown wounded

The Skirmish at Roanoke Inlet near present day Manteo, on August 15, 1776, involved the American Outer Banks Independent Company, led by Captain Dennis Dauge, repelling a British foraging party. The British were attempting to capture cattle, but the Patriot militia intercepted them, killed some of the soldiers, and captured the rest. This event was one of many skirmishes during the American Revolutionary War in North Carolina. The skirmish highlights the constant threat of British foraging parties along the North Carolina coast during the Revolutionary War and the effective resistance put up by local Patriot militias.
