= Signal tower =

Signal tower may refer to:

- Towers used for signalling control on railways
- Signal stations used for directing traffic on waterways
- Optical telegraph stations
- Stations used in other forms of early telegraphy
- Communications towers used for telecommunications and broadcasting
