= Theodore S. Meekins House =

Historic house in North Carolina, United States

- U.S. National Register of Historic Places
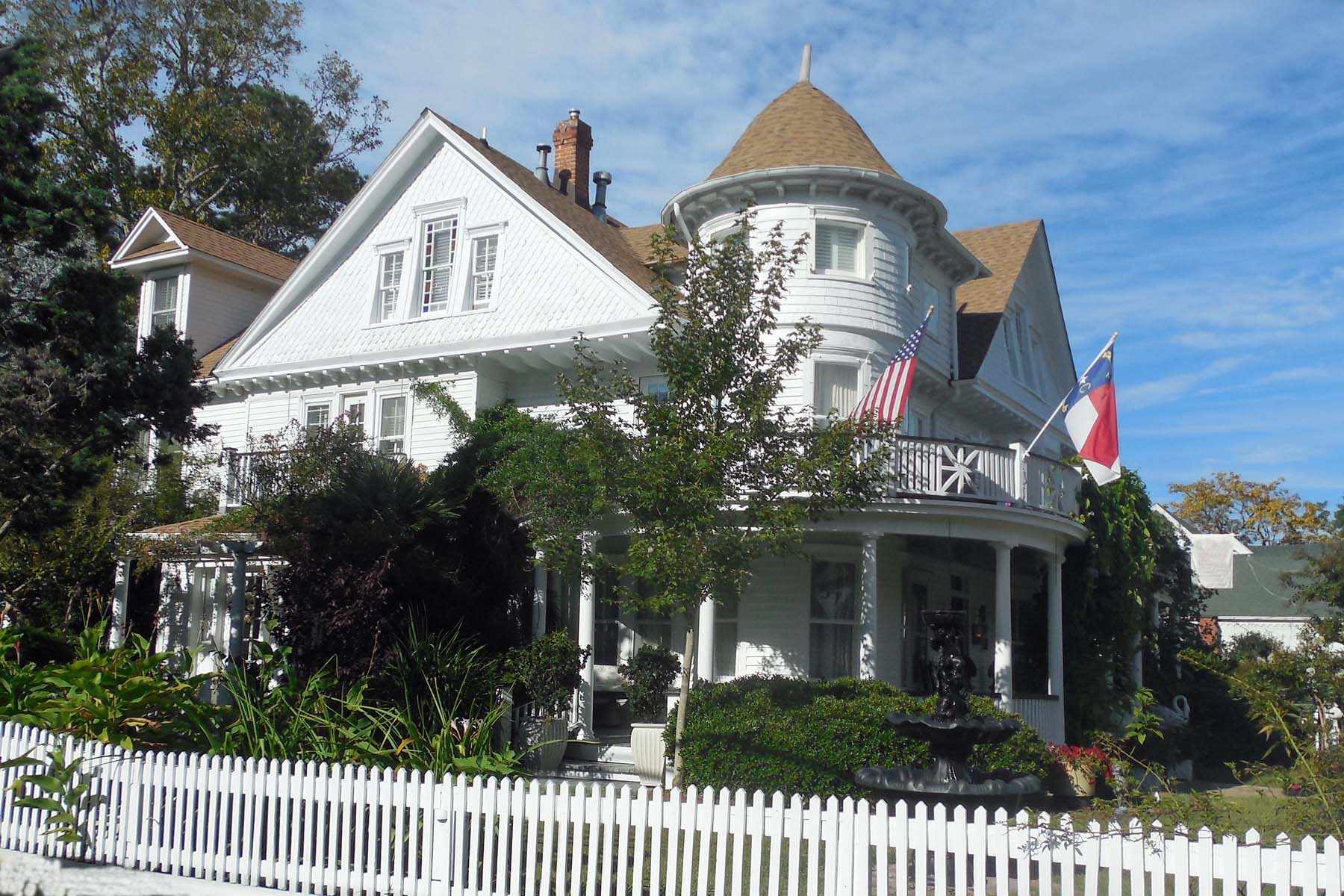
- Meekins House, September 2013

- Location within North Carolina Location within the United States
- Location: 319 Sir Walter Raleigh St., Manteo, North Carolina
- Coordinates: 35°54′31″N 75°40′22″W
- Area: less than one acre
- Built: 1904, 1910-1912
- Built by: Wilson, John; Dailey, Joe
- Architectural style: Queen Anne
- NRHP reference No.: 82001295
- Added to NRHP: December 17, 1982

Theodore S. Meekins House is a historic home located at Manteo, Dare County, North Carolina. The original one-story section, now the kitchen ell, was built in 1904. Between 1910 and 1912, the 2 1/2-story, Queen Anne style main section was added. It features a three-story corner tower and one-story wraparound porch.

It was listed on the National Register of Historic Places in 1982.
