= Eben Ezra Roberts =

American architect

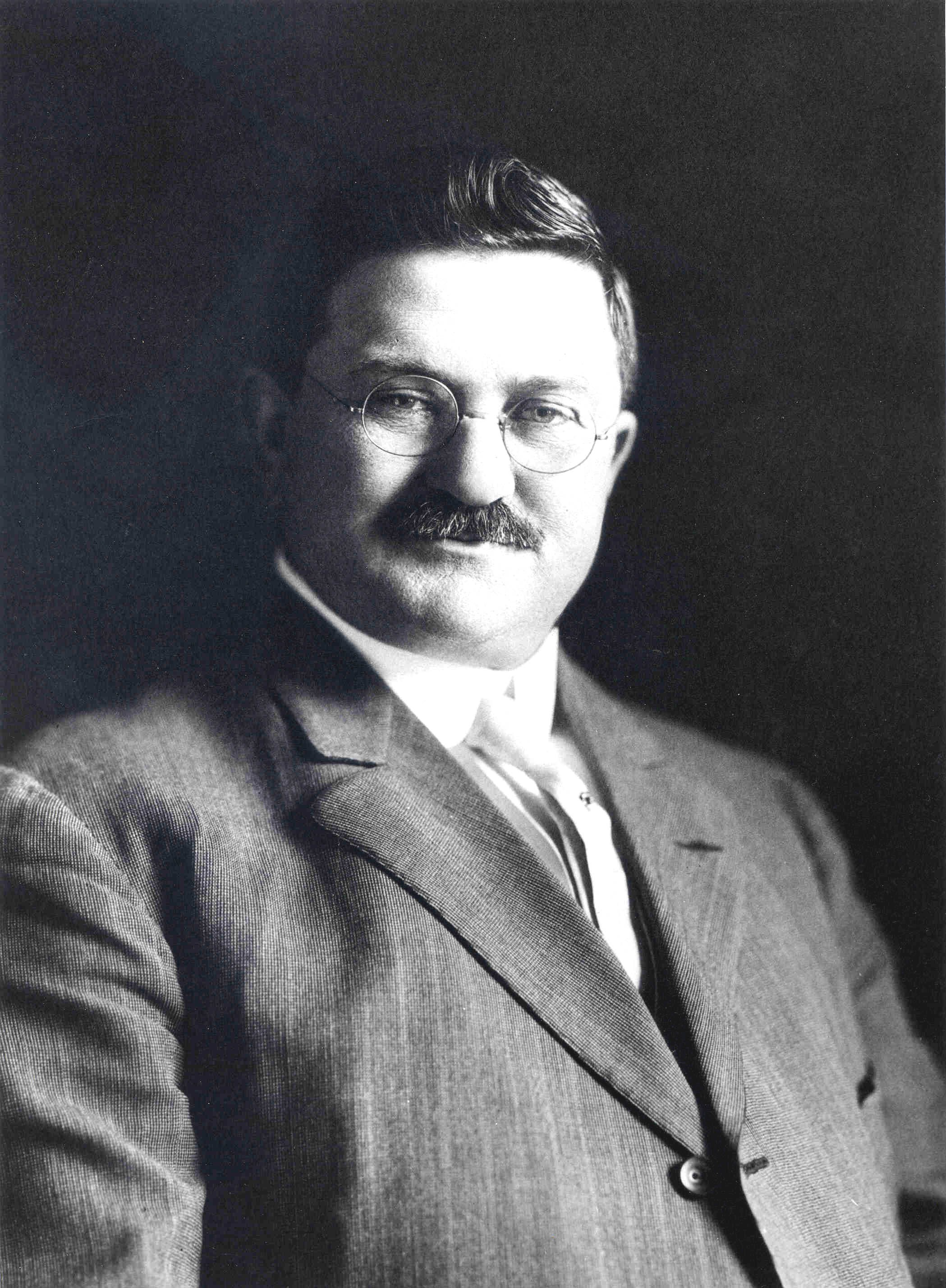
- Born: 1866; Boston, Massachusetts
- Died: 1943 (aged 76–77)
- Education: Tilton School
- Occupation: Architect
- Practice: E.E. Roberts Architect and Superintendent (1893-1924); E.E. and Elmer C. Roberts, Inc. (1924-1943)

Eben Ezra Roberts (1866–1943) was an American architect known for his work in the early modern Prairie style, pioneered by Frank Lloyd Wright, as well as other traditional residential styles. Roberts was born in Boston and attended architectural school at Tilton Seminary in New Hampshire. After moving to Chicago he eventually established a practice in the suburb of Oak Park, Illinois. In Oak Park alone, Roberts designed over 200 houses.

== Early life ==
Eben Ezra Roberts was born in Boston and attended public school. His father trained him in both mechanical and freehand drawing as he grew up. His family moved to Meredith, New Hampshire where Roberts' education continued in public schools there. He went on to study architecture at Tilton Seminary, now known as Tilton School, in New Hampshire.

== Career ==
In 1888 Roberts moved to Chicago where he worked as a site superintendent for S.S. Beman at Pullman, on the south side of the city. Roberts remained at that job until 1893. Roberts moved to the Chicago suburb of Oak Park in 1893 and established his own practice which eventually grew to become the largest architecture firm in the village of Oak Park, rivaling even architecture giant Frank Lloyd Wright's practice. In Oak Park he designed over 200 homes which span a multitude of architectural styles. Wright and Roberts were not, themselves, professionally associated, other than the fact that they were competing architects.

Once in Oak Park Roberts focused on residential work until he moved his office to Chicago in 1912 where he focused on larger, commercial projects. Roberts' practice in Oak Park grew quickly and he soon employed several draftsmen. Despite eventually working in Chicago, Roberts remained an Oak Park resident until he died in 1943. Roberts and his wife Rossie Roberts (née Willey) lived in the Eben Ezra Roberts House on Superior Street in Oak Park for most of the time they were in the village. At that home, now a contributing property to the U.S. federally Registered Frank Lloyd Wright-Prairie School of Architecture Historic District, Roberts and his wife raised their two children Margaret and Elmer C. Roberts.

Roberts' Oak Park firm, established in 1893, maintained two offices: one was at Marion Street and North Blvd in the Dunlop Brothers Bank Building, the other was along Superior Street. After the office moved to 82 West Washington Street in Chicago in 1912 Roberts' son, Elmer, began to work in the practice as a draftsman until he left for architectural school in 1913. When the younger Roberts graduated he became a staff member and in 1924 he became a full partner. E.E. Roberts became ill in 1926 and went into retirement, though he worked as an adviser to the firm for some time after leaving. In 1930 the pair designed the Borden Dairy Building on Vincennes Road in Blue Island, Illinois in the Art Deco style.

== Works and style ==
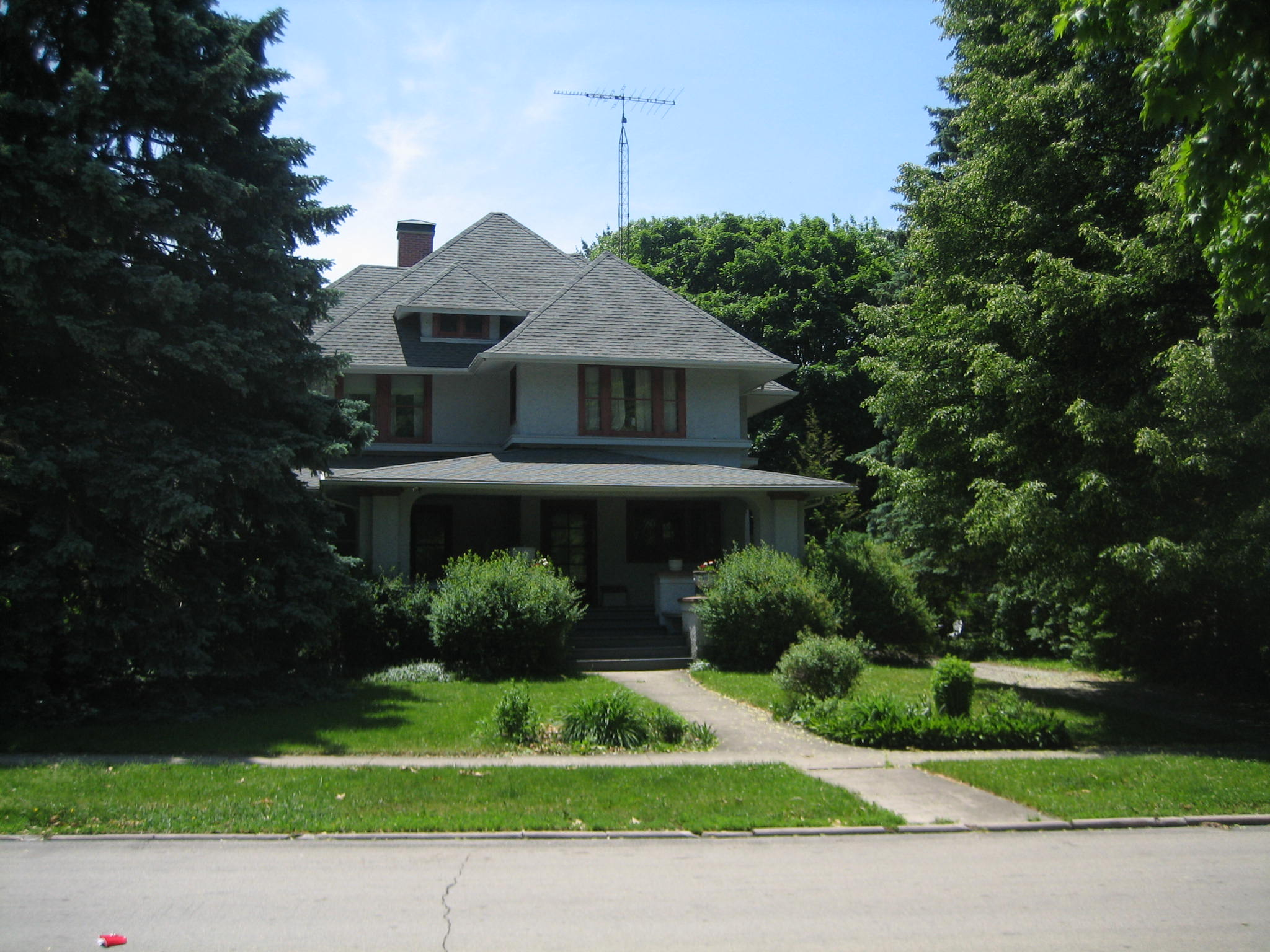
The E.J. Wiswall House, an E.E. Roberts building in DeKalb, Illinois.

Roberts designed buildings in many styles but after he began accepting mostly commercial commissions he favored Prairie style and its emphasis on horizontal lines. It is his work in this early modern style and the architectural transformation that took place in the early 20th century for which he is remembered. Roberts 1890s designs were aimed at popular tastes at the time. He designed homes across the gamut of architectural styles, Queen Anne, Shingle style and Tudor Revival are but some of the examples of the styles his homes conformed to.

In 1900 Roberts work underwent a distinct shift with the design of the A.J. Redmond House in Oak Park. His residential work began to adapt a more horizontal emphasis, featuring broad windows, hip roofs, wide eaves and large pier-supported porches dominating the front facade. Many of Roberts' early 20th century residential works are of this type, commonly following the stock American Foursquare plan with wood-trimmed stucco exteriors and full-width porches with massive corner piers. The homes varied in decorative details such as dormers and other exterior features. The horizontal emphasis, broad, overhanging eaves and hip roofs are all common elements of Prairie style, a school many houses of the foursquare tradition adhere to. Other examples of Roberts' Prairie style residential work is found in Oak Park houses such as the Henry P. Magill House, the Frank W. Hall House, Charles Schwerin House and the Louis Brink House.

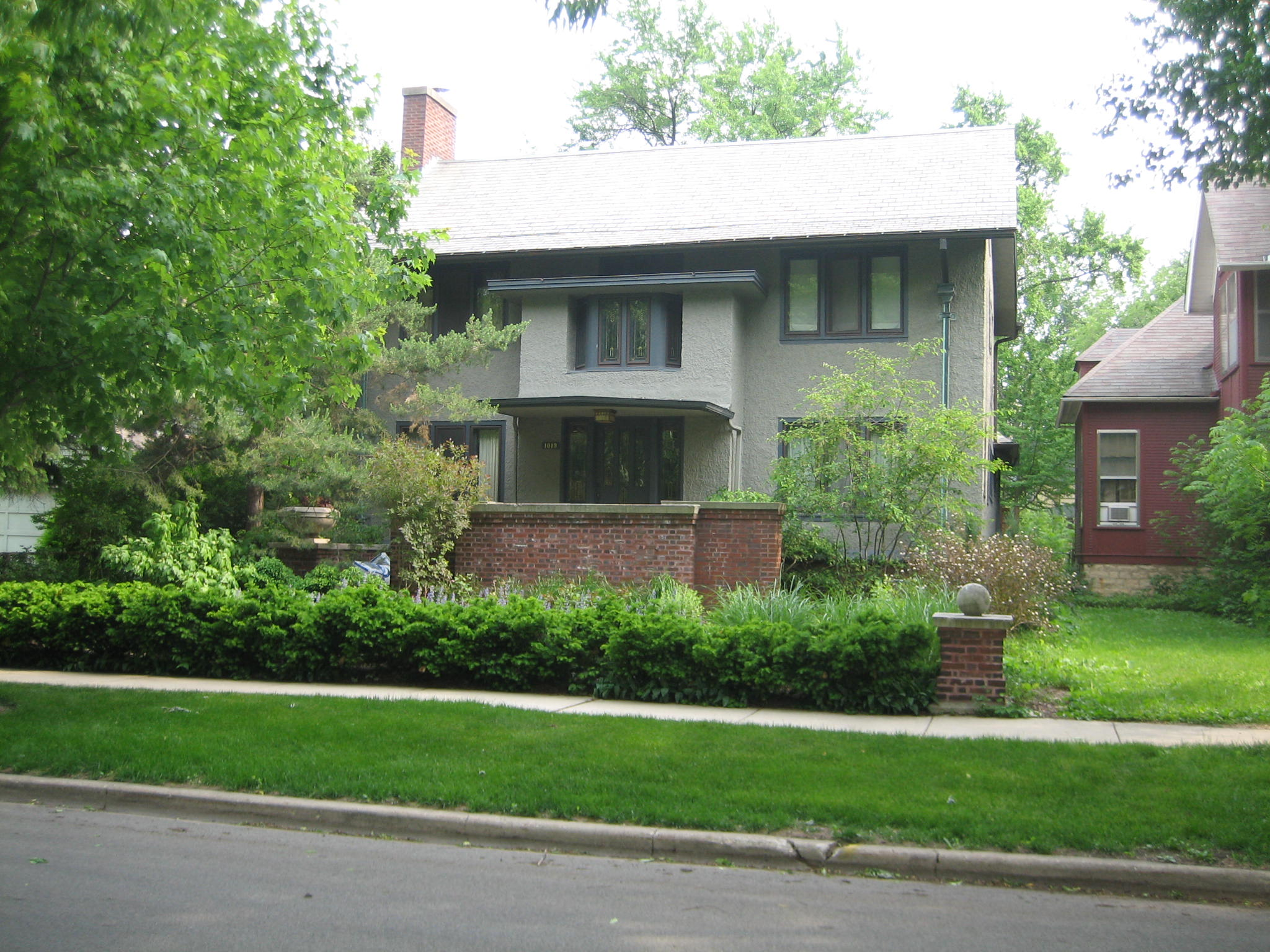
The Eben Ezra Roberts House in Oak Park, Illinois.

One example of Roberts' commercial work in Oak Park, the Prairie style Scoville Square, is listed on the U.S. National Register of Historic Places.

== Other works ==
- 1111 South Boulevard in Oak Park, theater building later adapted for use as film production space for Atlas Educational Film Company. Extant.
- 1136 Ontario Street in Oak Park, 12-unit residential building constructed in 1926. Extant.
