= John T. Daniels House =

Historic house in North Carolina, United States

- U.S. National Register of Historic Places
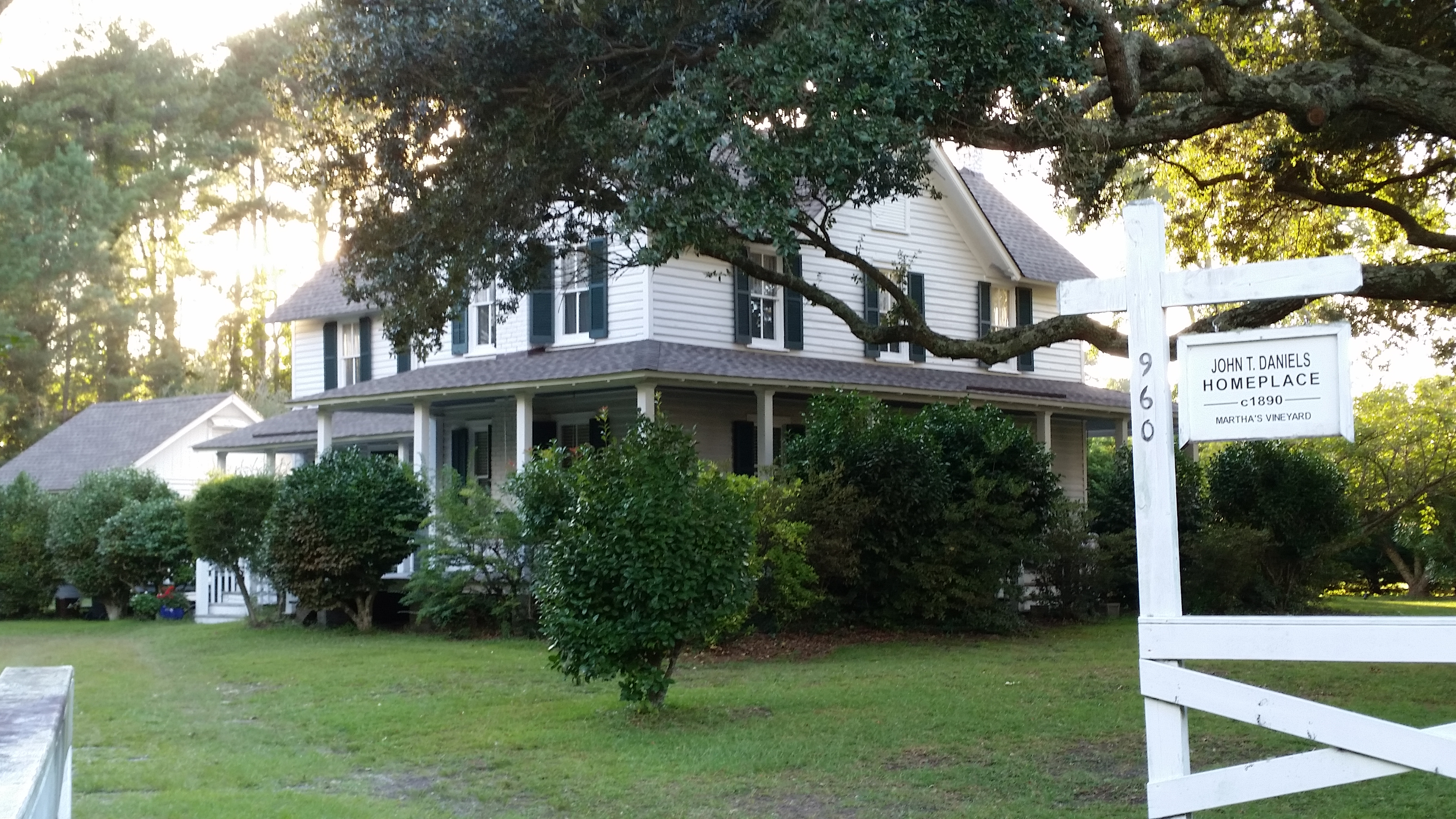

- Location within North Carolina Location within the United States
- Location: 960 Burnside Rd., Manteo, North Carolina
- Coordinates: 35°54′25″N 75°41′0″W
- Area: 8.2 acres (3.3 ha)
- Built: c. 1900
- Architectural style: Queen Anne
- NRHP reference No.: 03000339
- Added to NRHP: May 1, 2003

John T. Daniels House is a historic home located at Manteo, Dare County, North Carolina. It was built about 1900, and is a two-story frame I-house dwelling with a two-story rear ell and Queen Anne design elements. Also on the property is the former kitchen. It was the home of John T. Daniels, a surfman of the United States Life-Saving Service who photographed the first flight of the Wright Flyer.

It was listed on the National Register of Historic Places in 2003.

== See also ==
- John T. Daniels
