= Coastal warning display tower =

Type of signal station

A coastal warning display tower, also known as a storm warning tower, is a type of signal station in the United States in the form of skeletal towers designed to provide warnings of hazardous wind conditions in coastal areas. The towers were developed in 1898 on the orders of US president William McKinley. Through a system of flags, the towers can indicate not only wind-related warnings, but also major aspects of the local daily weather forecast.

Warning pennant

Warning flag

A single red pennant was shown from the top of the tower as a small craft advisory; for a gale warning, two such pennants were used. Two square flags, red with a black square at center, indicate an approaching hurricane or winds greater than 73 miles per hour (117 km/h). One such flag warns of storm-force winds or an approaching tropical storm.

Three lights, two red and one white, carry the signal at night. Red over white indicates a small craft advisory, white over red indicates a gale warning, red over red indicates a storm warning. All three lights together, red-white-red, warns of a hurricane or other hurricane-force wind event.

Other flags can be used to indicate the direction of winds during a tropical storm or storm warning, to indicate the temperature change relative to the previous day, to warn of an approaching cold front, and to show the forecast coverage of precipitation (widespread fair weather, scattered precipitation, or widespread precipitation), although this practice largely became obsolete after about 1925 as radio began to take over the role of disseminating weather forecasts.

== Remaining towers ==
- Manteo, North Carolina, operated by the North Carolina Maritime Museum
- Portsmouth, New Hampshire
- Providence, Rhode Island
- New Haven, Connecticut
- Southport, North Carolina
- Hammond, Oregon
- Oswego, New York, at Fort Ontario State Historic Site
- Washington, North Carolina, operated by the City of Washington

== See also ==
- Weather beacon
