= Elizabeth B. Grimball =

American theatrical producer (1875–1953)

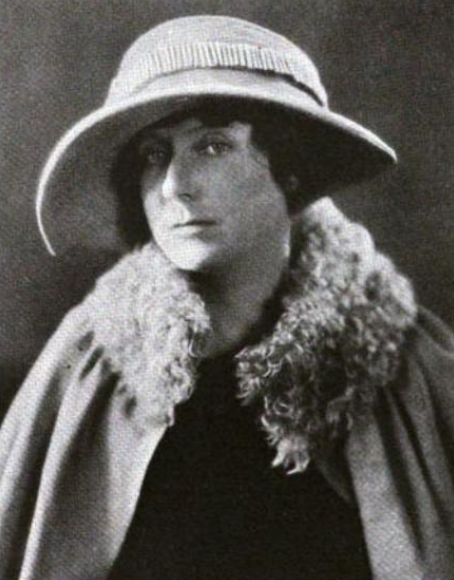
- Elizabeth B. Grimball, from a 1925 publication
- Born: November 11, 1875; Union, South Carolina, U.S.
- Died: August 30, 1953 (aged 77); Charleston, South Carolina, U.S.
- Education: Curry School of Expression; University of Oxford
- Occupations: Theatrical and film producer; writer; director; entrepreneur; educator

Elizabeth Berkley Grimball (November 11, 1875 – August 30, 1953) was an American theatrical and film producer, writer, director, entrepreneur, and educator. She founded and directed Inter-Theater Arts in New York, and produced more than two dozen historical pageants.

== Early life ==
Grimball was born in Union, South Carolina, the daughter of Harry Morris Grimball and Helen Emily Trenholm Grimball. Her mother was born in Liverpool. The Grimball family were prominent planters and slaveholders near Charleston before the American Civil War. She earned a General Culture Diploma (GCD) from the Curry School of Expression in Boston in 1898, and attended courses at the University of Oxford.

== Career ==
Grimball worked in France during World War I, as part of the YMCA's Overseas Entertainment Bureau, producing entertainment for American troops. In the 1930s, she taught and produced shows at the Mozarteum Summer Academy of Music, Theatre, and Dance in Salzburg, Austria.

Grimball was founder and director of Inter-Theater Arts, a theater school and workshop in Greenwich Village. She taught speech and drama classes at The Berkeley Institute in Brooklyn for two years and produced directed shows in Greenwich Village through the 1920s. "It always fires me up to think that my work is to make other people play," she said in a 1925 interview. Helen Gahagan was one of her students.

In the South, Grimball wrote and produced more than two dozen historical and patriotic pageants and plays for children, some with "immense" casts of nonprofessional performers. She made one silent film for Atlas Educational Film Company, The Lost Colony (1921), written by educator Mabel Evans Jones and meant for use in North Carolina schools and communities. She taught elocution at Converse College, and was head of the Oral English department at the Summer School of the Alabama Girls' Technical Institute.

== Publications ==
- The Snow Queen: A Fairy Play for Children in Two Acts (1920)
- The Torch Bearers of the Western World: A Pageant of South America (1920)
- The Waif: A Christmas Morality of the Twentieth Century (1923)
- Costuming a Play: Inter-Theatre Arts Handbook (1925, with Rhea Wells)
- Pelham Pageant, 1776-1926 (1926, with William R. Montgomery and F. E. Montgomery)
- The Flag of the Free: A program and ceremonial for Independence Day (1926)
- Where to go in Charleston : a service view of America's most historic city, Charleston, South Carolina (1944, a guide for military personnel)

== Personal life ==
Grimball died in 1953, in a Charleston hospital.
