= Enemies of Youth =

1925 silent film

- Directed by: Arthur Berthelet
- Written by: S. A. Van Patten
- Starring: Mahlon Hamilton; Gladys Leslie; J. Barney Sherry
- Production company: Atlas Educational Film Company
- Distributed by: Moeller Theater Service
- Release date: March 6, 1925
- Running time: 60 minutes
- Country: United States
- Languages: Silent; English intertitles

Enemies of Youth is a 1925 American independent silent drama film directed by Arthur Berthelet and starring Mahlon Hamilton, Gladys Leslie and J. Barney Sherry.

== Cast ==
- Mahlon Hamilton
- Gladys Leslie
- J. Barney Sherry
- Jack Drumier
- Jane Jennings
- Burr McIntosh
- Charles Delaney
- Gladys Walton

== Bibliography ==
- Munden, Kenneth White. The American Film Institute Catalog of Motion Pictures Produced in the United States, Part 1. University of California Press, 1997.
