= Atlas Educational Film Company =

Film production business in Chicago, Illinois

Atlas Educational Film Company was a film production business in Chicago, Illinois. It had a production studio at 1111 South Boulevard in Oak Park, a former theater building designed by E. E. Roberts. It is still standing. Addresses for the company were also listed as 3 Wabash Avenue and 63 East Adams Street. Atlas was also a dealer of portable projectors, slides, and offered a catalog of educational slides and films.

C. A. Rehm was the company's secretary and a film was contracted for the building of his model home.

== History ==
In 1914 it was reported to be part of Atlas School Supply and offered "motion picture services" to schools and colleges. It advertised projector sales as well as educational films and slides. In 1914 it was using 35 mm film.

In 1918, the company was contracted to film a demonstration tour of power trucks.

One of their movie soundtracks, titled "Radio magic", was recorded on wax cylinder by Victor Records.

The Cleveland Public Library has a publication from the company titled Answers from Atlas. The Smithsonian Institution holds a collection of trade catalogs issued by the company.

== Filmography ==
- Lost Colony (1921) by Elizabeth Grimball, about early colonists
- All Around with the Cameraman (1921)
- Along the Green Bay Trail (1922), directed by George Frederic Wheeler, scenario by A. VanPatten, extant
- Enemies of Youth (1925)
- My Home Town (1925), appears to be a film promoting Beloit that was part of a business promotion campaign in the city
- Making Blue Prints
- Elisha and the Shunnamite, portraying a biblical story
- The Drill Press
- Bar Work; Magnesium Part 1, United States Office of Education training video about use of a turret lathe
- Bar Work; Magnesium Part 2, film about lathing magnesium
- Bar Work; Part 3 (1945)
- First Impressions, Navy Department training video on new employee orientation best practices
- Discipline (1943), U.S. Navy training video
- North Carolina Pictorial History
- Student Flyer (1944)
- Whenever You Eat (1949), extant
- 500,000 to 1 (1954), extant film documenting the battle against bugs and promoting insecticide
