= George Washington Creef House =

Historic house in North Carolina, United States

- U.S. National Register of Historic Places
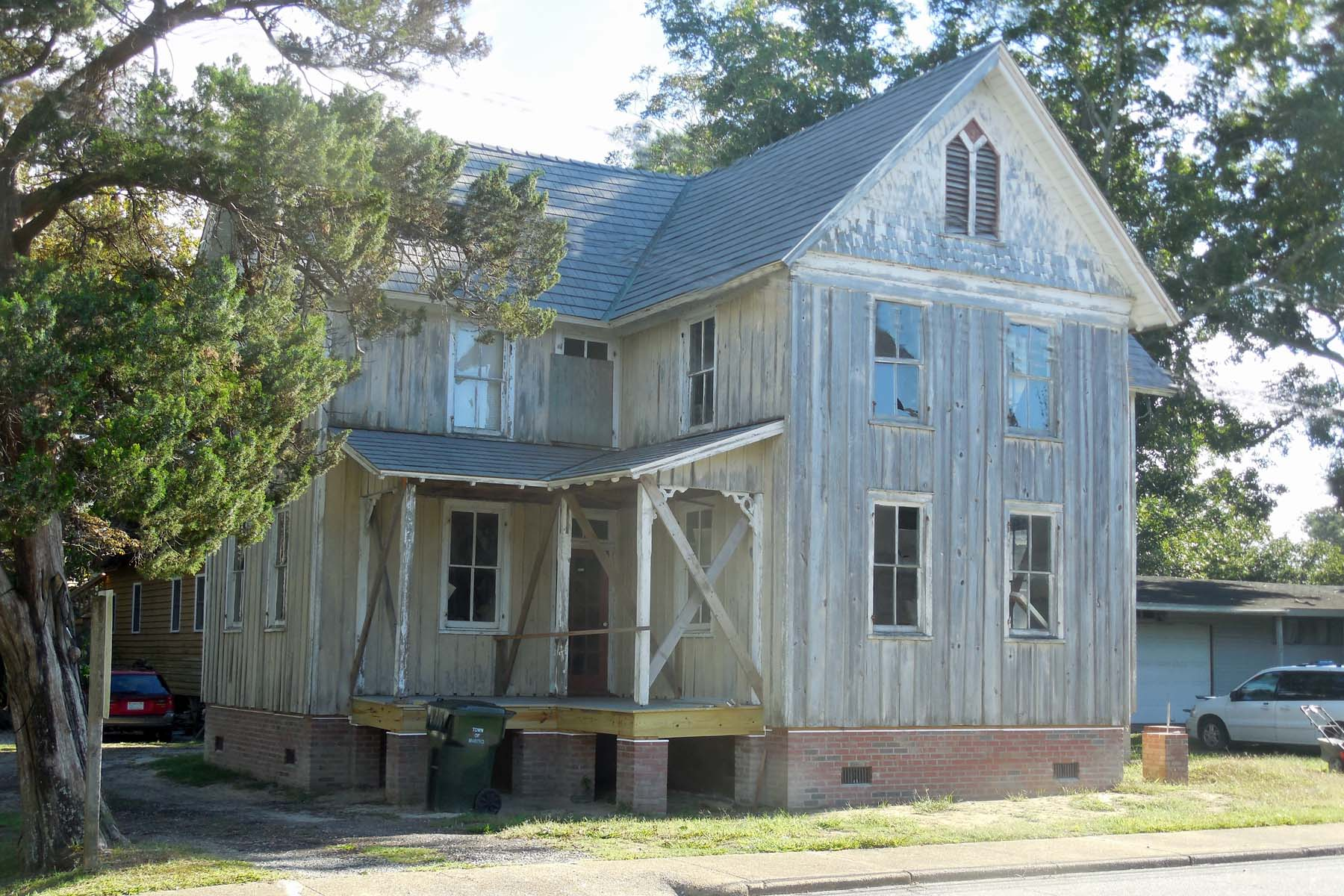
- Creef House, September 2012

- Location within North Carolina Location within the United States
- Location: 304 Budleigh St., Manteo, North Carolina
- Coordinates: 35°54′29″N 75°40′18″W
- Area: less than one acre
- Built: c. 1895
- Architectural style: Victorian cottage
- NRHP reference No.: 82004798
- Added to NRHP: August 12, 1982

George Washington Creef House is a historic home located at Manteo, Dare County, North Carolina. It was built about 1895, and is a two-story, L-shaped, frame dwelling with Victorian design elements.

It was listed on the National Register of Historic Places in 1982.
