= Mabel Evans Jones =

American educator

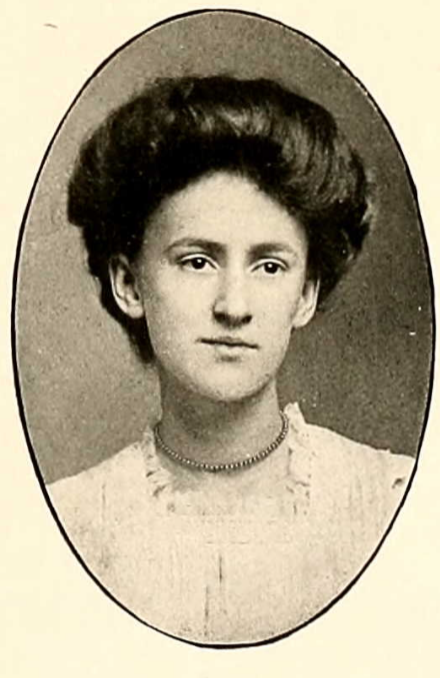
- Mabel Augusta Evans (later Jones), from the 1908 yearbook of Greensboro College
- Born: Mabel Augusta Evans; December 6, 1888; Manteo, North Carolina, U.S.
- Died: August 31, 1982; Elizabeth City, North Carolina, U.S.
- Occupation(s): Educator, writer, school administrator
- Notable work: The Lost Colony (1921 film)

Mabel Augusta Evans Jones (December 6, 1888 – August 31, 1982) was an American educator and writer. As superintendent of schools in Dare County, North Carolina, she wrote and produced the silent film The Lost Colony (1921), directed by Elizabeth B. Grimball and intended for classroom and community educational use.

== Early life ==
Mabel Augusta Evans was born in Manteo, North Carolina, the daughter of Richard Coles Evans and Cordelia Augusta Cofield Evans. She graduated from Greensboro College in 1908. In the 1920s she studied at the University of North Carolina at Chapel Hill, and she completed a master's degree at Teachers College, Columbia University.

== Career ==
Mabel Evans Jones was superintendent of schools in Dare County, North Carolina, beginning in 1920. She visited the island schools in her county by boat. She wrote the script for The Lost Colony (1921), a silent film directed by Elizabeth B. Grimball for use in classrooms and community education. Jones also produced the movie and appeared on screen as Eleanor Dare. She stayed involved with organizing The Lost Colony performances at Manteo into the 1960s.

Evans supervised the elementary schools in Northampton County, North Carolina in the late 1920s. She taught in Alabama for ten years, and worked at Seatone Children's Camp near Manteo. In 1950, she was a member of the Dare County Board of Education. Much later in life, in 1971 and 1976, Evans recorded commentaries about the making of the film.

== Personal life ==
Evans married grocer Onslow Jennings Jones in 1939. Her husband died in 1958, and Mabel Evans Jones died in 1982, aged 93 years, in Elizabeth City, North Carolina. The Roanoke Island Historical Association holds a copy of the 1921 film she wrote and produced. Her great-niece Patricia Baum Salgado was producer of The Lost Colony in Manteo in the 1990s.
