= Scoville Square =

- Masonic Temple Building
- U.S. National Register of Historic Places
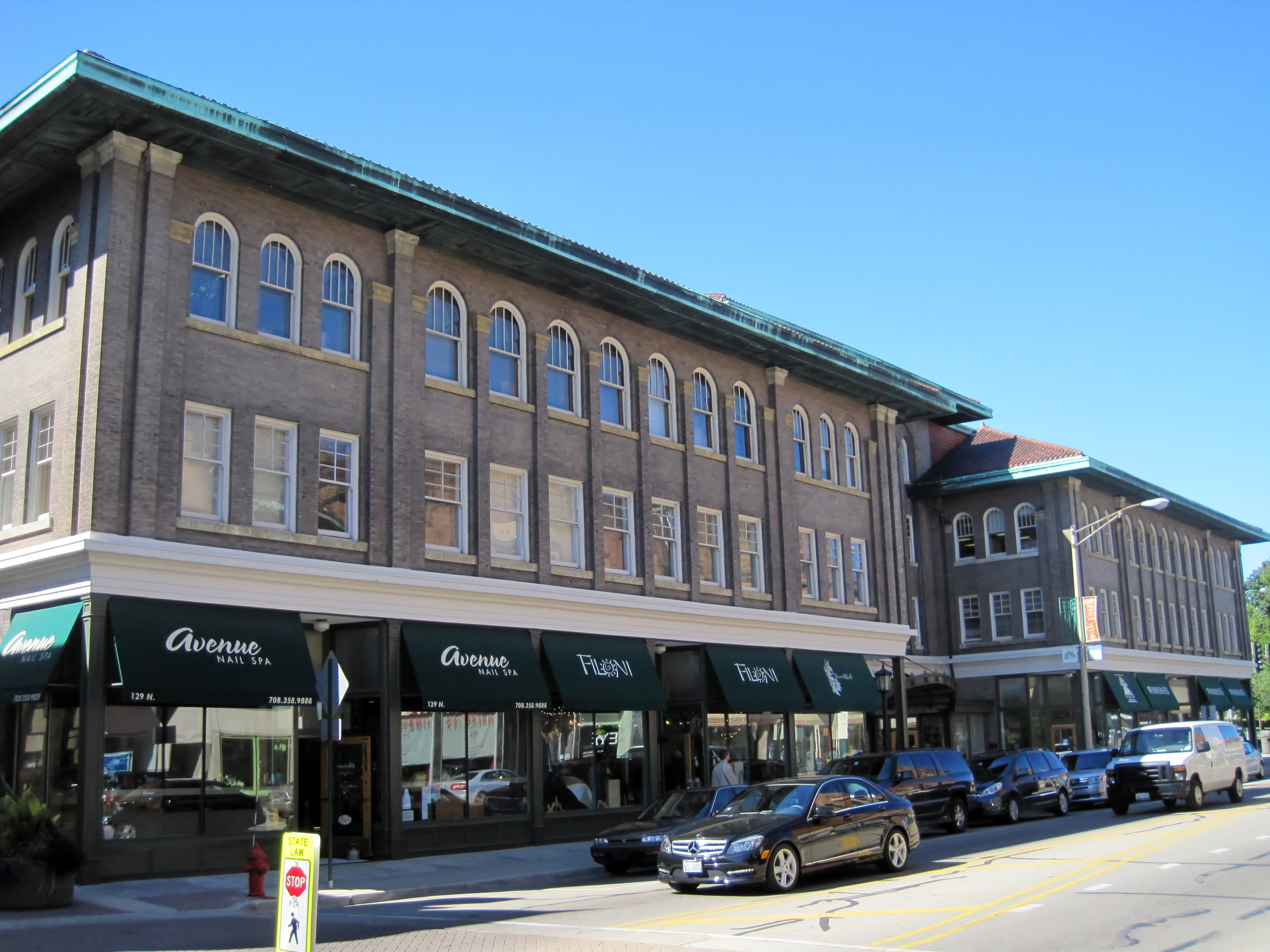

- Location within Illinois Location within the United States
- Location: 119—137 N. Oak Park Ave., Oak Park, Illinois
- Coordinates: 41°53′17″N 87°47′41″W
- Area: 0.5 acres (0.20 ha)
- Built: 1906–1909
- Architect: Eben Ezra Roberts
- Architectural style: Prairie School
- NRHP reference No.: 82002532
- Added to NRHP: February 11, 1982

The Masonic Temple Building (also known as the Scoville Block, Gilmore's Store, and Scoville Square Building) is a historic Prairie-style building in Oak Park, Illinois, at the corner of Oak Park Avenue and Lake Street. It is in the Ridgeland-Oak Park Historic District and was individually listed on the National Register of Historic Places in 1982.

The building is one of only a few commercial buildings built in the Prairie School architectural style. The three-story building was built for C. B. Scoville to a design by E. E. Roberts and was constructed between 1906 and 1909. The first floor was designed for retail use, with iron and glass storefronts. A course of limestone separates the storefronts from the upper stories, which are faced with brick. A fourth story was added in 1914. Architectural details in the interior include an oak staircase and a lobby with leaded art-glass windows and marble wainscoting.

Oak Park's Masonic lodges were among the building's first tenants. After the Masons vacated the premises, the building was sold to Gilmore's Department Store. The department store used the building from 1930 until it closed in the 1970s. After Gilmore's department store closed, the village of Oak Park bought the building to save it from demolition and contributed public money toward its restoration and renovation. Restoration work including removal of a black glass facade that Gilmore's had applied to the building. The building is now known as the Scoville Square building and houses retail business on the ground floor and offices on its upper floors.

== See also ==
- National Register of Historic Places listings in Cook County, Illinois
