= Manteo, North Carolina =

- Town
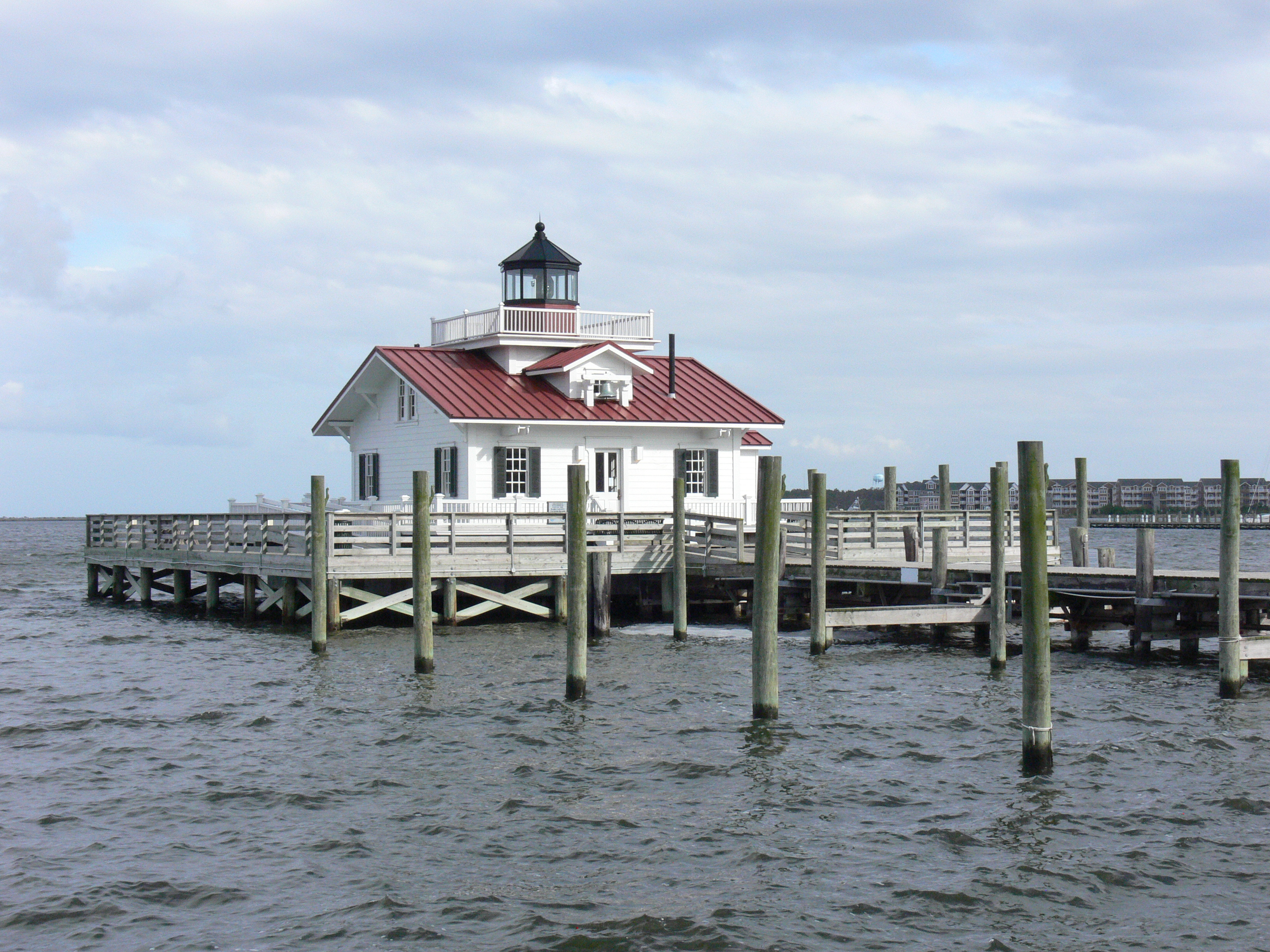
- Reconstructed Roanoke Marshes Light on the waterfront of Manteo

- Flag Seal
- Motto: "Preserve • Prosper"
- Location in Dare County, North Carolina

- Location within North Carolina Location within the United States
- Coordinates: 35°54′17″N 75°40′10″W
- Country: United States
- State: North Carolina
- County: Dare
- Founded: 1865
- Incorporated: 1899
- Named for: Manteo (Native American leader)

Government
  - Mayor: Bobby Owens
  - Mayor Pro Tem: Betty Selby

Area
  - Total: 1.94 sq mi (5.02 km^{2})
  - Land: 1.88 sq mi (4.86 km^{2})
  - Water: 0.058 sq mi (0.15 km^{2})
- Elevation: 6.6 ft (2 m)

Population (2020)
  - Total: 1,600
  - Density: 852.5/sq mi (329.15/km^{2})
- Time zone: UTC-5 (Eastern (EST))
  - Summer (DST): UTC-4 (EDT)
- ZIP code: 27954
- Area code: 252
- FIPS code: 37-41060
- GNIS feature ID: 0989291
- Website: www.manteonc.gov

Manteo (/ˈmæni.oʊ/ MAN-ee-oh) is a town in Dare County, North Carolina, United States, located on Roanoke Island. The population was 1,602 at the 2020 census. It is the county seat of Dare County.

== History ==
The town is named for an American Indian named Manteo, a Croatan. Manteo traveled with the English to London in 1584 where he and another Indian, Wanchese, learned to become the liaisons between the Roanoke Colony settlers and the Indians. He also had favorable interaction with British colonist John White. In fact, Manteo was christened and given the name Lord of Roanoke, making him the first American Indian to receive a title of nobility. Eventually, John White's daughter Eleanor married Ananias Dare, and they had the first American-born English child, Virginia Dare. In 1587, Manteo was friendly to White when he returned to find what the final stage of the Roanoke Colony became. When the colonists disappeared after supplies from England were delayed for three years, the ongoing mystery of "The Lost Colony" began.

Manteo was named the seat of government for Dare County in 1870, and was incorporated in 1899.

Dare County is named for Virginia Dare.

In 1999, North Carolina public radio (NPR), WUNC, began broadcasting in Manteo as part of an effort to bring public radio to one of the largest areas on the East Coast of the United States without such service.

In 2005, Manteo restored its coastal warning display tower, and it is now operated by the Manteo branch of the North Carolina Maritime Museum.

The George Washington Creef House, John T. Daniels House, Fort Raleigh National Historic Site, and Theodore S. Meekins House are listed on the National Register of Historic Places. The Flag of Manteo is the Saint George's Cross.

== Geography ==
Manteo is located at 35°54′17″N 75°40′10″W (35.904595, −75.669385), on the north central area of Roanoke Island. It is located off the exit at the South 16 mile post on US Hwy 158 at Whalebone Junction, the junction of NC Highways 158, 64, and 12, known as the Beach Road.

According to the United States Census Bureau, the town has a total area of 1.98 square miles (5.13 km^{2}), of which 1.92 square miles (4.97 km^{2}) is land and 0.06 square miles (0.16 km^{2}), or 3.09%, is water.

=== Climate ===
Manteo has a humid subtropical climate (Cfa) like most of North Carolina with long, hot summers and short, cool winters. Precipitation is very heavy year round and falls on around 87 days. Snow is a rare sight.

Climate data for Manteo, North Carolina (Dare County Regional Airport) (1991–2020 normals, extremes 1929–present)
| Month | Jan | Feb | Mar | Apr | May | Jun | Jul | Aug | Sep | Oct | Nov | Dec | Year |
|---|---|---|---|---|---|---|---|---|---|---|---|---|---|
| Record high °F (°C) | 77 (25) | 84 (29) | 88 (31) | 93 (34) | 95 (35) | 101 (38) | 102 (39) | 103 (39) | 97 (36) | 94 (34) | 88 (31) | 81 (27) | 101 (38) |
| Mean maximum °F (°C) | 68.0 (20.0) | 69.0 (20.6) | 75.5 (24.2) | 81.6 (27.6) | 88.0 (31.1) | 93.4 (34.1) | 95.2 (35.1) | 94.1 (34.5) | 88.8 (31.6) | 83.2 (28.4) | 75.2 (24.0) | 69.4 (20.8) | 96.8 (36.0) |
| Mean daily maximum °F (°C) | 50.7 (10.4) | 52.5 (11.4) | 58.6 (14.8) | 67.9 (19.9) | 74.8 (23.8) | 82.2 (27.9) | 85.8 (29.9) | 84.2 (29.0) | 79.3 (26.3) | 71.4 (21.9) | 61.4 (16.3) | 54.9 (12.7) | 68.6 (20.3) |
| Daily mean °F (°C) | 43.1 (6.2) | 44.9 (7.2) | 50.6 (10.3) | 59.6 (15.3) | 67.4 (19.7) | 75.5 (24.2) | 79.6 (26.4) | 78.2 (25.7) | 73.9 (23.3) | 64.8 (18.2) | 54.5 (12.5) | 47.5 (8.6) | 61.6 (16.4) |
| Mean daily minimum °F (°C) | 35.6 (2.0) | 37.3 (2.9) | 42.7 (5.9) | 51.4 (10.8) | 60.0 (15.6) | 68.9 (20.5) | 73.4 (23.0) | 72.3 (22.4) | 68.5 (20.3) | 58.2 (14.6) | 47.6 (8.7) | 40.2 (4.6) | 54.7 (12.6) |
| Mean minimum °F (°C) | 21.3 (−5.9) | 23.7 (−4.6) | 29.0 (−1.7) | 37.6 (3.1) | 46.9 (8.3) | 56.2 (13.4) | 64.2 (17.9) | 63.3 (17.4) | 57.7 (14.3) | 44.3 (6.8) | 34.2 (1.2) | 27.7 (−2.4) | 19.6 (−6.9) |
| Record low °F (°C) | −2 (−19) | 10 (−12) | 10 (−12) | 23 (−5) | 34 (1) | 44 (7) | 53 (12) | 54 (12) | 40 (4) | 29 (−2) | 20 (−7) | 12 (−11) | −2 (−19) |
| Average precipitation inches (mm) | 3.78 (96) | 3.16 (80) | 3.80 (97) | 2.93 (74) | 3.52 (89) | 4.46 (113) | 5.26 (134) | 5.64 (143) | 4.54 (115) | 3.24 (82) | 2.88 (73) | 3.34 (85) | 46.55 (1,182) |
| Average snowfall inches (cm) | 0.7 (1.8) | 0.4 (1.0) | 0.0 (0.0) | 0.0 (0.0) | 0.0 (0.0) | 0.0 (0.0) | 0.0 (0.0) | 0.0 (0.0) | 0.0 (0.0) | 0.0 (0.0) | 0.0 (0.0) | 0.0 (0.0) | 1.1 (2.8) |
| Average precipitation days (≥ 0.01 in) | 7.6 | 7.6 | 8.1 | 6.8 | 7.0 | 7.6 | 8.9 | 8.1 | 6.5 | 5.8 | 6.0 | 6.9 | 86.9 |
| Average snowy days (≥ 0.1 in) | 0.3 | 0.2 | 0.0 | 0.0 | 0.0 | 0.0 | 0.0 | 0.0 | 0.0 | 0.0 | 0.0 | 0.1 | 0.6 |
Source: NOAAIEM

== Demographics ==
Historical population
| Census | Pop. | Note | %± |
|---|---|---|---|
| 1940 | 571 | | — |
| 1950 | 635 | | 11.2% |
| 1960 | 587 | | −7.6% |
| 1970 | 547 | | −6.8% |
| 1980 | 902 | | 64.9% |
| 1990 | 991 | | 9.9% |
| 2000 | 1,052 | | 6.2% |
| 2010 | 1,434 | | 36.3% |
| 2020 | 1,600 | | 11.6% |
| 2021 (est.) | 1,625 | ▲ | 1.6% |

=== 2020 census ===
Manteo racial composition
| Race | Number | Percentage |
|---|---|---|
| White (non-Hispanic) | 1,326 | 82.88% |
| Black or African American (non-Hispanic) | 74 | 4.63% |
| Native American | 6 | 0.38% |
| Asian | 8 | 0.5% |
| Other/Mixed | 50 | 3.13% |
| Hispanic or Latino | 136 | 8.5% |

As of the 2020 United States census, there were 1,600 people, 865 households, and 491 families residing in the town.

=== 2010 census ===
As of the census of 2010, there were 1,434 people, 681 households, and 373 families residing in the town. The population density was 843.5 people per square mile (318.7/km2˜). There were 1,353 housing units at an average density of 795.9 per square mile (300.7/km2˜). The racial makeup of the town was 84.7% White, 8.4% African American, 0.8% Native American, 0.3% Asian, 2.6% from other races, and 3% from two or more races. Hispanic or Latino of any race was 9% of the population.

There were 681 households, out of which 25.4% had children under the age of 18 living with them, 38.8% were married couples living together, 12.5% had a female householder with no husband present, and 45.2% were non-families. 39.1% of all households were made up of individuals, and 14.7% had someone living alone who was 65 years of age or older. The average household size was 2.11 and the average family size was 2.77.

In the town, the population was spread out, with 22.5% aged 19 or younger, 4.5% from 20 to 24, 25.6% from 25 to 44, 30.2% from 45 to 64, and 17.1% who were 65 years of age or older. The median age was 42.8 years. For every 100 females, there were 83.1 males. For every 100 females age 18 and over, there were 79.4 males.

The median income for a household in the town was $29,803, and the median income for a family was $40,625. The per capita income for the town was $23,803. About 26.5% of families and 32% of the population were below the poverty level, including 63.7% of those under age 18 and 12.6% of those age 65 or over.

Manteo is part of North Carolina's 3rd congressional district, represented by Republican Walt Jones, elected in 1994, until his death on February 10, 2019, where he was succeeded by Greg Murphy.

== Festivals and events ==
Dare Day — An annual celebration for the people of Dare County. The festival is free and open to all residents and visitors. There is a variety of entertainment, food, and shopping with all activities in walking distance. This festival is held on the first Saturday of June.

The New World Festival of the Arts — Held on the Manteo waterfront, It is an exhibition that features over 80 selected artists displaying and selling their work. It is a two-day outdoor art show that has been held for over 23 years running.

Pirate's Cove Billfish Tournament — This fishing tournament takes place annually in mid-August. Teams and boats come from around the world to participate. In the 2014 tournament, the boat with the highest cash prize was the Waste Knot (Captain Barry Sawyer) and angler of the winning fish (Denise LaCour). The team took home a cash prize of over $60,000.

== Education ==
Dare County Schools is the area school district. The local schools are Manteo Elementary School, Manteo Middle School, and Manteo High School.

Dare County Library has a branch in Manteo.

== Twin towns ==
The town claimed it is twinned with Bideford, Devon in England, based on a long-forgotten informal meeting. In April 2008, members of Bideford's town council visited Manteo in preparation to formalize the twinning in 2009.

Manteo has been twinned with Youghal, County Cork, Ireland since July 4, 2006.

== Notable people ==
- George Ackles, professional basketball player
- Marc Basnight, served as a Democratic member of the North Carolina State Senate
- Emanuel Davis, defensive back in the Canadian Football League
- Andy Griffith, actor, comedian, television producer, Southern gospel singer, and writer was a longtime resident of Manteo prior to his death in 2012
- Mabel Evans Jones, educator
- William Ivey Long, costume designer for stage and film
