= Signal station =

Visual Aid to Navigation

A signal station is a form of aids to navigation that is defined by the IHO simply as "a place on shore from which signals are made to ships at sea". While this broad definition would include coastal radio stations and fog signal stations, the term is most often used for shore installation that use visual signals to communicate with ships at sea.

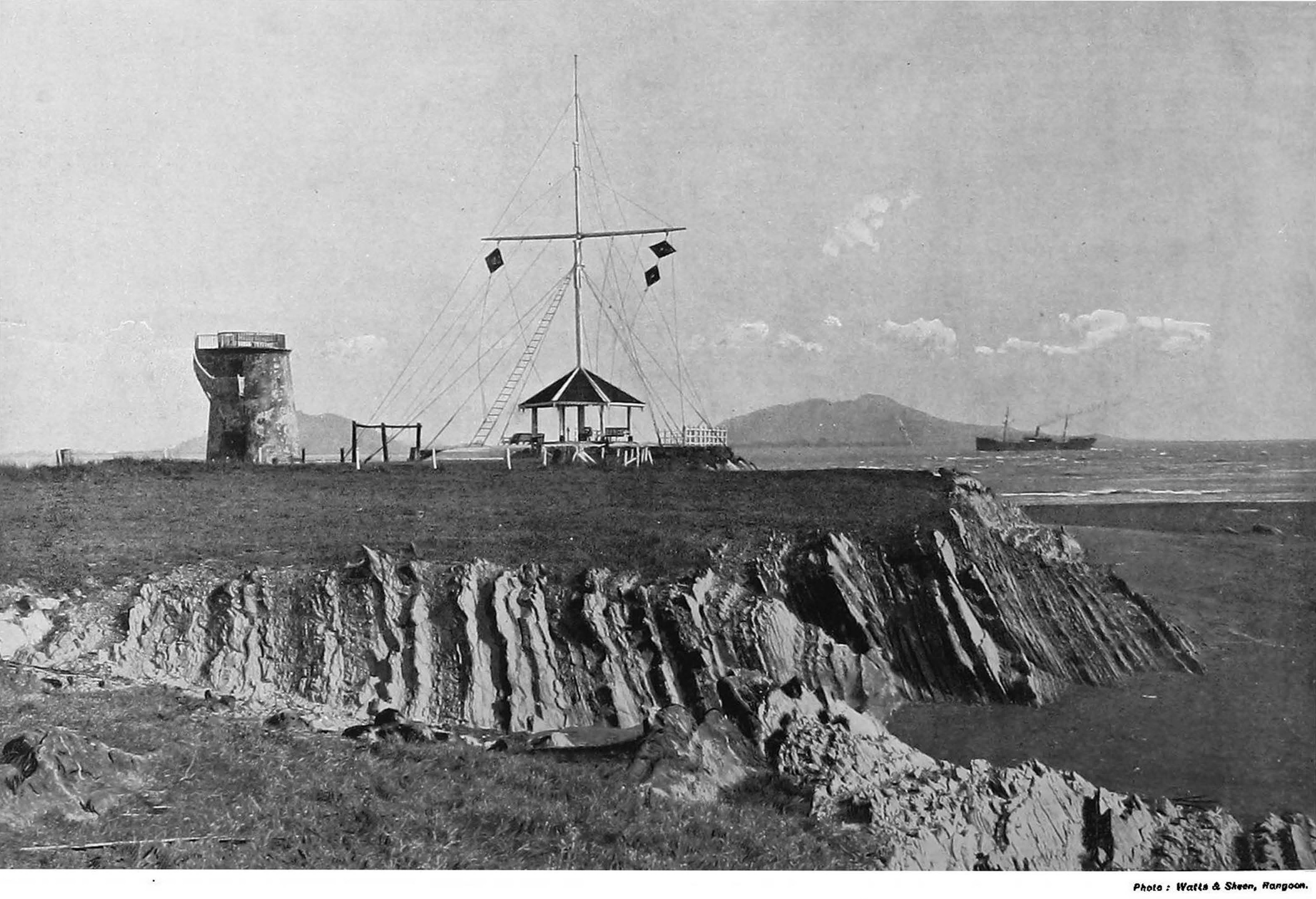
Lloyd's Signalling Station, Burma, late 1890's.

== History ==
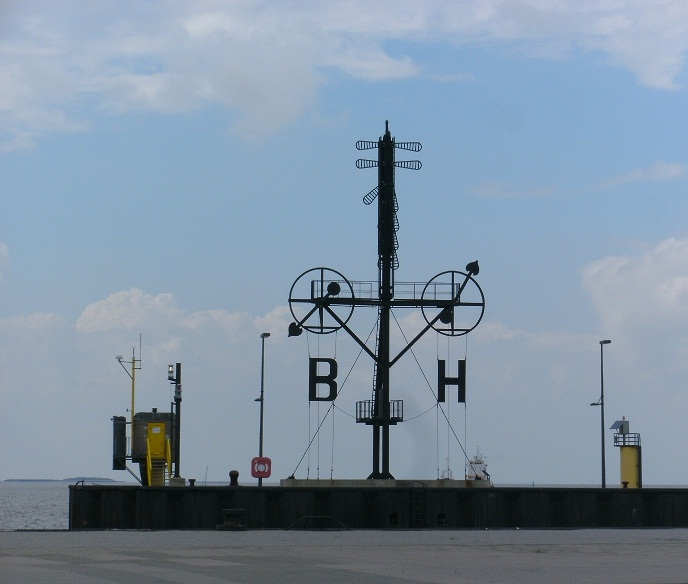
The Semaphor in the harbour of Bremerhaven, Germany.

Signal stations were the only practical mean of communicating with passing ships until the development of radio, and played a critical role in both navigation safety and commercial operation of fleets. As they were normally located in high places with extensive fields of view, surviving signal stations are often in scenic locations, and have become local landmarks.

The remains of a Roman signal station have been uncovered at Filey Brigg in North Yorkshire, England.

Signal stations used a variety of means to communicate shore-to-ship: Chappe Telegraph or other forms of pole-and-arm optical telegraph, flag semaphore, heliograph, slat semaphore, and port-specific signals (like flag and ball weather warnings). The most widespread method was through different forms of flaghoist. Signals were often private signals, requiring local knowledge or code books.

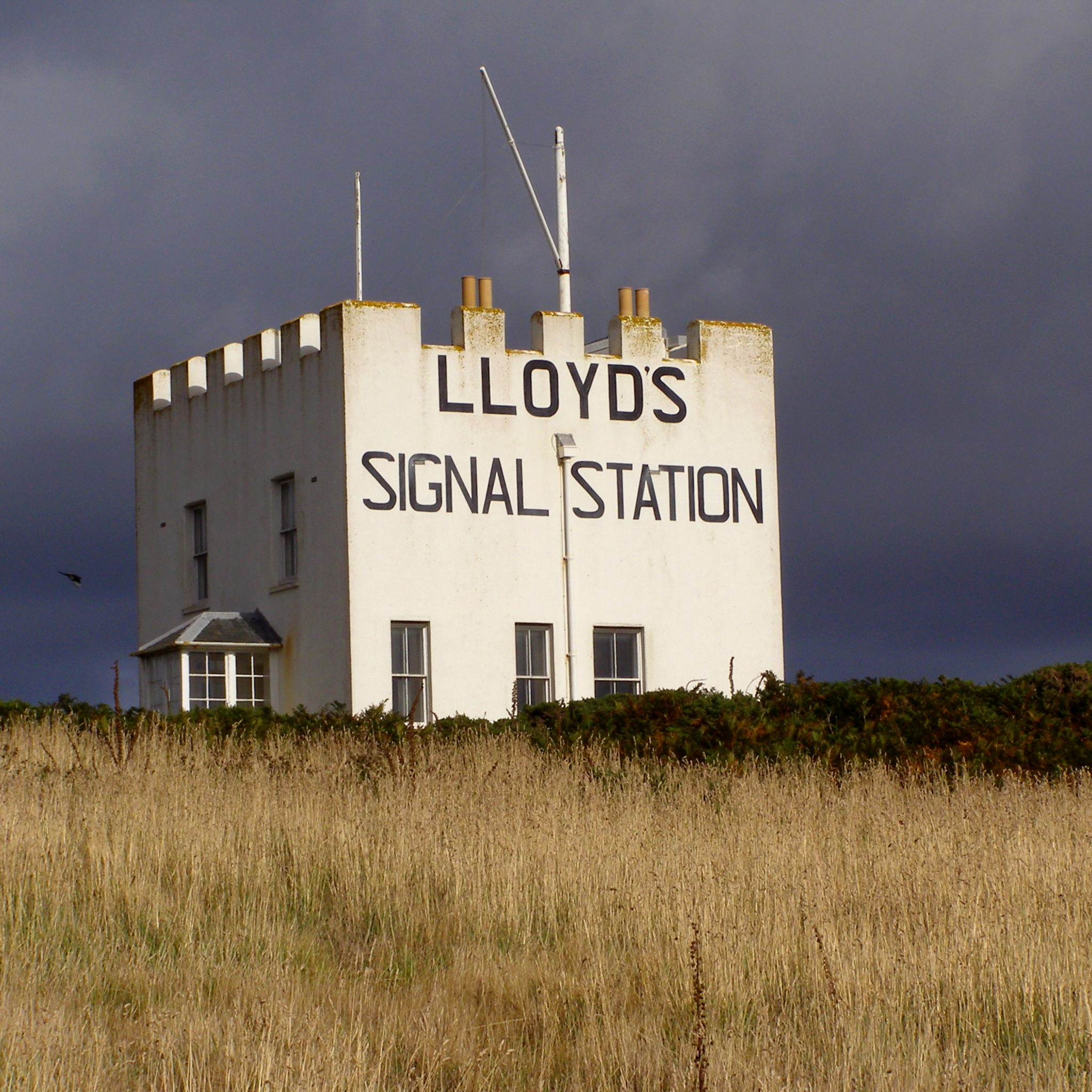
Lloyds Signal Station at the Lizard, Cornwall

From the 1880s, Lloyd's operated a network of signal stations around the world, connected to telegraph land-lines, that served to relay orders from owners and obtain reports from ships' masters. Messages for passengers could also be sent using a flag semaphore, and light signals at night.

== Current roles ==
While radio has superseded the telegraph-relay role of signal stations, a number of signal stations remain in operation in situations where static visual signals provide fast access to specific safety information, such as traffic signalling in ports and narrow passages, or navigational warnings. In Japan, signal stations in the form of lighted letter boards are extensively used to mark traffic conditions, one way flows and predominant currents. Most ports elsewhere in the world will use a form of the International Port Traffic Signals system.

Tide gauges are usually classified as signal stations, as they provide immediate visual information of tide levels.

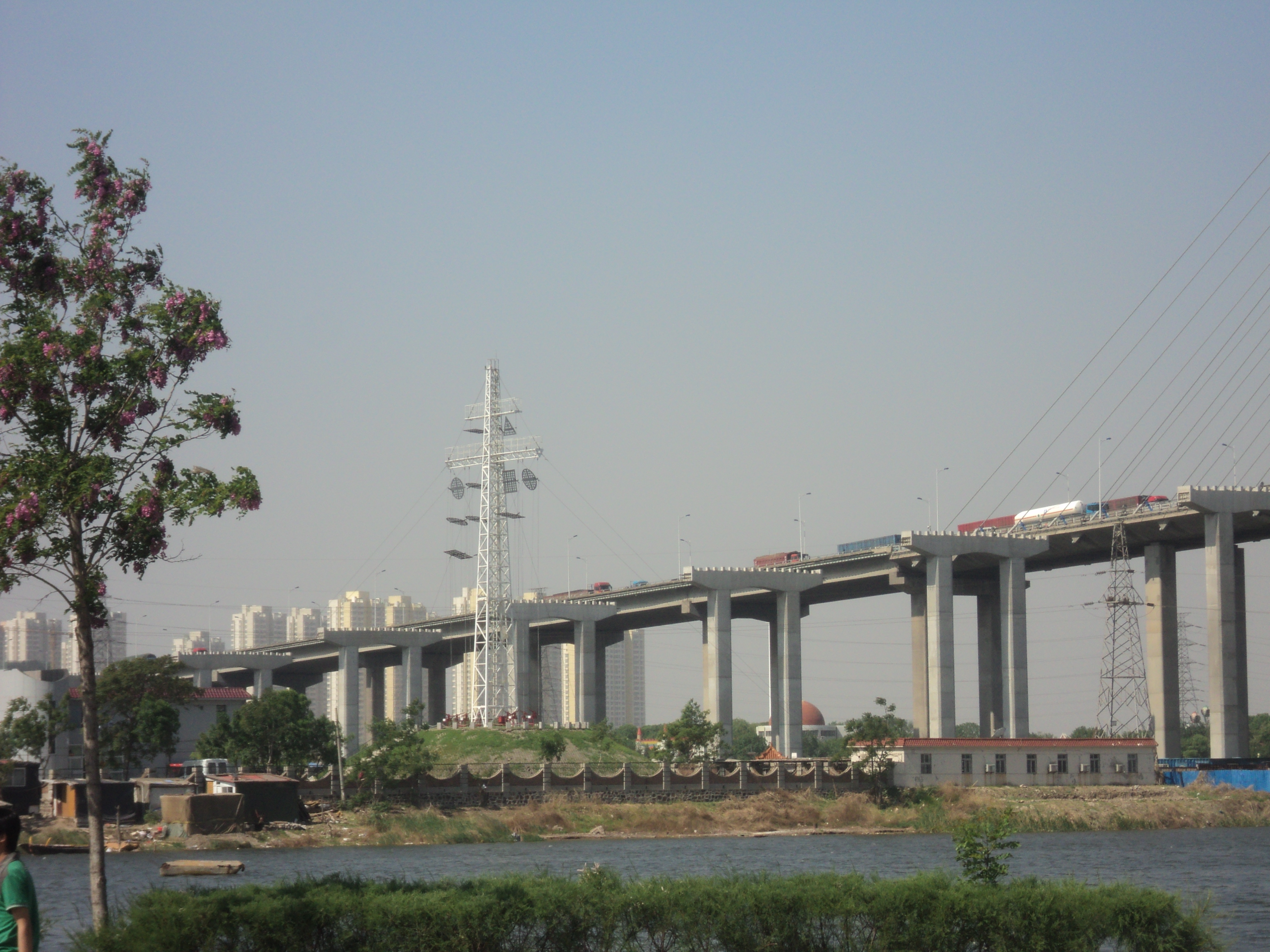
Tidal Signal Station at the Port of Tianjin, China

== See also ==
- Coastal warning display tower
