= Optatissima pax =

1947 papal encyclical by Pius XII

Optatissima pax Encyclical of Pope Pius XII
- Signature date: 18 December 1947
- Number: 13 of the pontificate
- Text: In Latin; In English

Optatissima pax is an encyclical of Pope Pius XII on prescribing public prayers for social and world peace given at Rome, at St. Peter's, the 18th day of December in the year 1947, the ninth of his pontificate.

Two years after World War II, peace still is in uncertain balance. People are in suspense and in several nations class conflicts are being incited to mutual hatred. The Pope considers the crisis of peace a serious one. The economic system of many nations has been dislocated as a result of military expenditures and war related destruction. Working people are exploited and incited to discord.

Peace can only be secured by working together in harmony, cooperation, and peaceful labour. It is the duty of all to realize that the world crisis is serious. All, especially the rich, must place the common welfare above their private advantage and profits. It is most urgent, to reconcile the hearts of men. Public and private life must return to Christ as soon as possible. The Pope places much trust in the prayers of innocent children, whose prayer for peace and reconciliation he requests during the Christmas season. The Pontiff closes the encyclical by imparting his Apostolic Benediction.
