= John T. Daniels =

American photographer who took the photograph of the first powered flight

Daniels's photograph (restored) of the first flight of the Wright Flyer in 1903, the first instance of powered flight

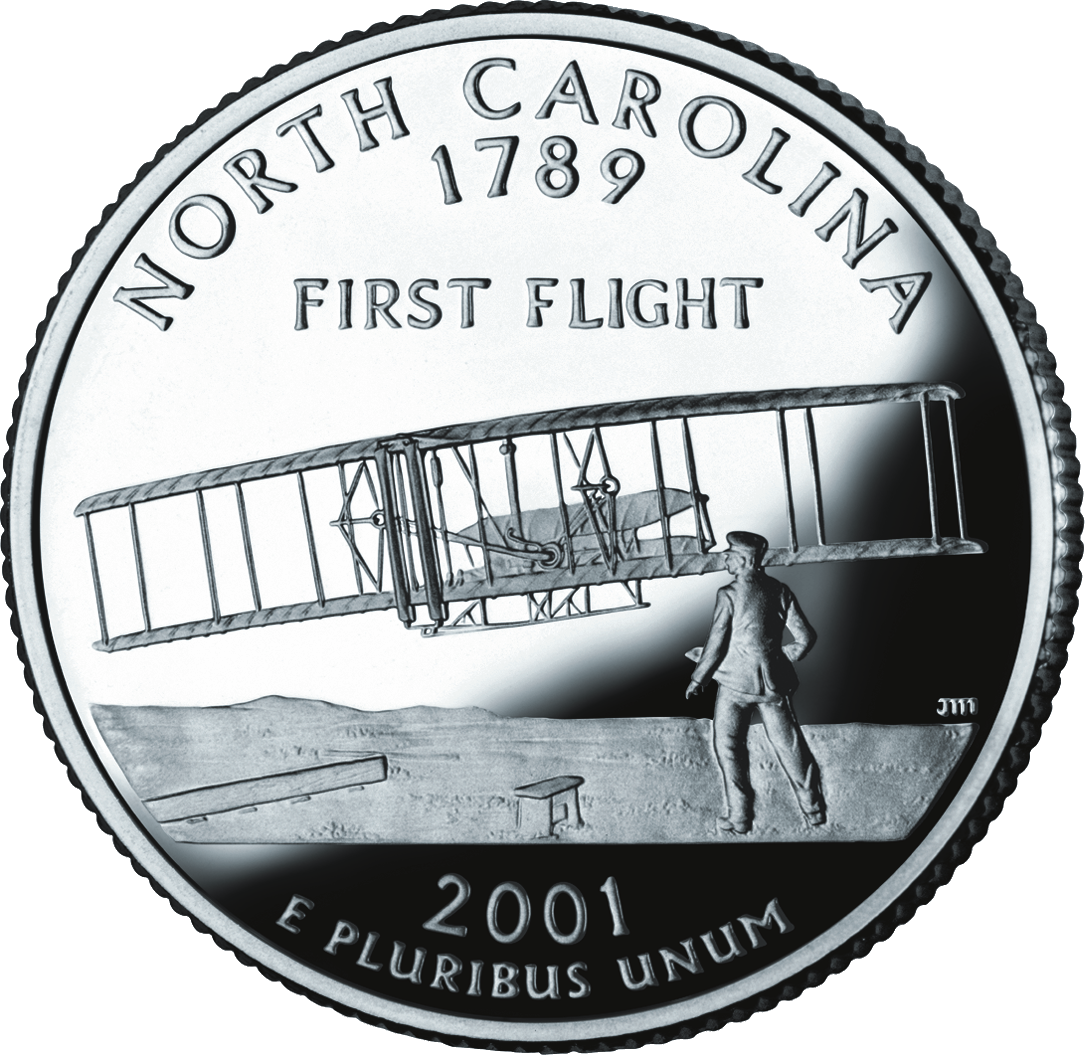
Daniels's photograph was adapted for the North Carolina quarter in the 50 State Quarters program.

John Thomas Daniels Jr. (July 31, 1873 – January 31, 1948) was a member of the U.S. Life-Saving Station in Kill Devil Hills, North Carolina, who took the photograph of the first powered flight on December 17, 1903. The flight was by the Wright brothers flying their Wright Flyer. Daniels, who had never seen a camera before, later said that he was so excited by seeing the Flyer rising that he was unsure if he had squeezed the bulb triggering the shutter. The camera that he operated was a Gundlach Korona V view camera, which used 5-by-7-inch glass-plate negatives. The camera was owned by the Wright brothers, who were careful to record the history-making moment, and also to preserve a record for any future patent claims. The plate was not developed until the Wright Brothers returned to Ohio.

The Wrights made four flights that day; three were photographed: the first, third and fourth. After the Wright Flyer was hauled back from the fourth flight, a powerful gust of wind caught it. Daniels grabbed a strut in an attempt to hold down the aircraft, but he was caught between the wings as the Flyer flipped end over end. Daniels was not seriously hurt, but the Flyer was destroyed with even the engine block split in half. Daniels would tell the story of the day he "survived the first airplane crash" for the remainder of his life.

Life-Saving Stations were located along U.S. coastlines to provide emergency rescues for crew and passengers of ships foundering offshore. Members of stations were typically known as "surfmen". The service was merged in 1915 into the new U.S. Coast Guard. Daniels retired from the Coast Guard in 1918.

In 1913, a decade after his famous photo, an older cousin of his, Josephus Daniels, became Secretary of the Navy, and later, Ambassador to Mexico, while earlier in life he had been a newspaper editor and publisher, gaining a controlling interest in the Raleigh News & Observer.

Daniels died January 31, 1948, one day after Orville Wright's death.

== Anniversary events ==
In 2003, Daniels's granddaughter participated in the 100th anniversary First Flight Ceremonies at Kill Devil Hills, Kitty Hawk, North Carolina.

On December 17, 2012, the great-grandniece of the Wright Brothers, Kate Jameson (through their niece Leontine Wright, daughter of their brother Lorin, later Jameson) reunited with the great-grandson of photographer John T. Daniels, also named John Daniels.

== See also ==
John T. Daniels House
