= Hawaii Rainbow Warriors baseball statistical leaders =

The Hawaii Rainbow Warriors baseball statistical leaders are individual statistical leaders of the Hawaii Rainbow Warriors baseball program in various categories, including batting average, home runs, runs batted in, runs, hits, stolen bases, ERA, and Strikeouts. Within those areas, the lists identify single-game, single-season, and career leaders. The Rainbow Warriors represent the University of Hawaii at Manoa in the NCAA's Big West Conference.

Hawaii began competing in intercollegiate baseball in 1923. These lists are updated through the end of the 2025 season.

== Batting Average ==
Career (min. 300 at-bats)
| Rk | Player | AVG | Seasons |
|---|---|---|---|
| 1 | Mario Monico | .367 | 1982 1983 1984 1985 |
| 2 | Brandon Haislet | .363 | 2007 2008 |
| 3 | Charles Jackson | .361 | 1982 1983 1984 |
| 4 | Kolten Wong | .358 | 2009 2010 2011 |
| 5 | Joey Meyer | .355 | 1982 1983 |
| 6 | Justin Frash | .353 | 2006 2007 |
| | Greg Oniate | .353 | 1980 1981 1982 1983 |
| 8 | Jamie Aloy | .348 | 1997 1998 1999 2000 |
| 9 | Kenny Harrison | .342 | 1990 1991 1992 1993 |
| 10 | Bill Blanchette | .341 | 1990 1991 1992 |

Season (min. 100 at-bats)
| Rk | Player | AVG | Season |
|---|---|---|---|
| 1 | Greg Oniate | .417 | 1981 |
| 2 | Mario Monico | .399 | 1984 |
| 3 | Robert Medeiros | .398 | 1997 |
| 4 | Mario Monico | .398 | 1985 |
| 5 | Thad Reece | .395 | 1979 |
| 6 | Tim Albert | .393 | 1991 |
| 7 | Charles Jackson | .391 | 1984 |
| 8 | Brandon Haislet | .389 | 2008 |
| | Kenny Harrison | .389 | 1993 |
| | Bill Blanchette | .389 | 1992 |

== Home Runs ==
Career
| Rk | Player | HR | Seasons |
|---|---|---|---|
| 1 | John Matias | 30 | 1985 1986 1987 1988 1989 |
| 2 | Kolten Wong | 25 | 2009 2010 2011 |
| 3 | Kevin MacDonald | 24 | 2007 2008 2009 2010 |
| | Greg Oniate | 24 | 1980 1981 1982 1983 |
| 5 | Jeff Van Doornum | 23 | 2008 2009 2010 2011 |
| | Joey Meyer | 23 | 1982 1983 |
| 7 | Vinnie Catricala | 20 | 2007 2008 2009 |
| | Markus Owens | 20 | 1985 1986 1987 |
| 9 | Kyson Donahue | 18 | 2022 2023 2024 |
| | Adam Fogel | 18 | 2016 2017 2018 2019 2020 2021 |
| | Franz Yuen | 18 | 1991 1992 1993 1994 |
| | Todd Takayoshi | 18 | 1988 1989 1990 1991 |

Season
| Rk | Player | HR | Season |
|---|---|---|---|
| 1 | Joey Meyer | 16 | 1983 |
| 2 | John Matias | 15 | 1988 |
| 3 | Jeff Van Doornum | 14 | 2010 |
| | Kevin MacDonald | 14 | 2009 |
| 5 | Vinnie Catricala | 13 | 2009 |
| 6 | John Matias | 12 | 1989 |
| 7 | Kolten Wong | 11 | 2009 |
| | Gregg Omori | 11 | 2001 |
| | Glenn Braggs | 11 | 1983 |
| 10 | Kamana Nahaku | 10 | 2025 |
| | Matt Wong | 10 | 2023 |
| | Kris Sanchez | 10 | 2007 |

Single Game
| Rk | Player | HR | Season | Opponent |
|---|---|---|---|---|
| 1 | Kamana Nahaku | 3 | 2025 | CSUN |
| | Kolten Wong | 3 | 2009 | LMU |
| | Mark McWherter | 3 | 1988 | BYU |
| | Mario Monico | 3 | 1985 | Utah |
| | Wade Mauricio | 3 | 1979 | UH-Hilo |
| | Jon Hansen | 3 | 1979 | UH-Hilo |

== Runs Batted In ==
Career
| Rk | Player | RBI | Seasons |
|---|---|---|---|
| 1 | Greg Oniate | 237 | 1980 1981 1982 1983 |
| 2 | Collin Tanabe | 209 | 1978 1979 1980 1981 |
| 3 | Todd Takayoshi | 203 | 1988 1989 1990 1991 |
| 4 | Randy Oyama | 195 | 1984 1985 1986 1987 1988 |
| 5 | Randy Inaba | 187 | 1982 1983 1984 1985 |
| 6 | Mario Monico | 179 | 1982 1983 1984 1985 |
| 7 | Mark McWherter | 166 | 1985 1986 1987 1988 1989 |
| 8 | Thad Reece | 164 | 1978 1979 1980 1981 |
| 9 | Rick Bass | 161 | 1977 1978 1979 1980 |
| 10 | John Matias | 157 | 1985 1986 1987 1988 1989 |

Season
| Rk | Player | RBI | Season |
|---|---|---|---|
| 1 | Mark McWherter | 78 | 1989 |
| 2 | Mario Monico | 77 | 1985 |
| 3 | Curt Watanabe | 75 | 1979 |
| | Charles Jackson | 75 | 1984 |
| 5 | Collin Tanabe | 70 | 1981 |
| 6 | Randy Inaba | 69 | 1985 |
| 7 | Todd Takayoshi | 67 | 1989 |
| 8 | Kris Sanchez | 66 | 2007 |
| 9 | Collin Tanabe | 64 | 1980 |
| | Greg Oniate | 64 | 1981 |
| | Todd Crosby | 64 | 1985 |

Single Game
| Rk | Player | RBI | Season | Opponent |
|---|---|---|---|---|
| 1 | Mario Monico | 10 | 1985 | Utah |

== Runs ==
Career
| Rk | Player | R | Seasons |
|---|---|---|---|
| 1 | Rick Bass | 278 | 1977 1978 1979 1980 |
| 2 | Thad Reece | 270 | 1978 1979 1980 1981 |
| 3 | Mario Monico | 256 | 1982 1983 1984 1985 |
| 4 | Todd Takayoshi | 209 | 1988 1989 1990 1991 |
| 5 | Todd Crosby | 200 | 1984 1985 1986 |
| 6 | Randy Inaba | 194 | 1982 1983 1984 1985 |
| 7 | Randy Oyama | 182 | 1984 1985 1986 1987 1988 |
| | Ross Kagawa | 182 | 1985 1986 1987 1988 1989 |
| 9 | Curt Watanabe | 178 | 1976 1977 1978 1979 |
| 10 | John Matias | 174 | 1985 1986 1987 1988 1989 |

Season
| Rk | Player | R | Season |
|---|---|---|---|
| 1 | Rick Bass | 99 | 1979 |
| 2 | Thad Reece | 97 | 1979 |
| 3 | Rick Bass | 91 | 1980 |
| 4 | Todd Crosby | 90 | 1985 |
| 5 | Mario Monico | 82 | 1984 |
| 6 | Thad Reece | 81 | 1980 |
| 7 | Curt Watanabe | 79 | 1979 |
| 8 | Mario Monico | 73 | 1985 |
| 9 | Todd Takayoshi | 72 | 1989 |
| 10 | Charles Jackson | 70 | 1984 |

== Hits ==
Career
| Rk | Player | H | Seasons |
|---|---|---|---|
| 1 | Rick Bass | 319 | 1977 1978 1979 1980 |
| 2 | Thad Reece | 317 | 1978 1979 1980 1981 |
| 3 | Mario Monico | 301 | 1982 1983 1984 1985 |
| 4 | Collin Tanabe | 278 | 1978 1979 1980 1981 |
| 5 | Greg Oniate | 269 | 1980 1981 1982 1983 |
| | Todd Takayoshi | 269 | 1988 1989 1990 1991 |
| 7 | Curt Watanabe | 266 | 1976 1977 1978 1979 |
| 8 | Randy Oyama | 249 | 1984 1985 1986 1987 1988 |
| 9 | Kolten Wong | 245 | 2009 2010 2011 |
| 10 | Jeff Van Doornum | 240 | 2008 2009 2010 2011 |

Season
| Rk | Player | H | Season |
|---|---|---|---|
| 1 | Thad Reece | 113 | 1979 |
| 2 | Curt Watanabe | 112 | 1979 |
| 3 | Mario Monico | 105 | 1985 |
| 4 | Rick Bass | 104 | 1980 |
| 5 | Rick Bass | 102 | 1979 |
| | Todd Crosby | 102 | 1985 |
| 7 | Collin Tanabe | 97 | 1980 |
| | Mario Monico | 97 | 1984 |
| 9 | Brandon Haislet | 89 | 2008 |
| | Kolten Wong | 89 | 2010 |

Single Game
| Rk | Player | H | Season | Opponent |
|---|---|---|---|---|
| 1 | Michael Dartt | 6 | 1999 | Air Force |

== Stolen Bases ==
Career
| Rk | Player | SB | Seasons |
|---|---|---|---|
| 1 | Rick Bass | 132 | 1977 1978 1979 1980 |
| 2 | Thad Reece | 114 | 1978 1979 1980 1981 |
| 3 | Ross Kagawa | 112 | 1985 1986 1987 1988 1989 |
| 4 | Todd Takayoshi | 72 | 1988 1989 1990 1991 |
| 5 | Robert Medeiros | 71 | 1994 1995 1996 1997 |
| | Mario Monico | 71 | 1982 1983 1984 1985 |
| 7 | John Matias | 70 | 1985 1986 1987 1988 1989 |
| 8 | Terry Derby | 66 | 1982 1983 |
| 9 | Kevin Williams | 65 | 1979 1980 |
| 10 | Neal Honma | 64 | 1995 1996 1997 1998 |

Season
| Rk | Player | SB | Season |
|---|---|---|---|
| 1 | Rick Bass | 50 | 1979 |
| 2 | Ross Kagawa | 41 | 1988 |
| 3 | Rick Bass | 39 | 1980 |
| 4 | Thad Reece | 38 | 1980 |
| 5 | Kevin Williams | 36 | 1980 |
| 6 | Sean Takamori | 34 | 1999 |
| | Thad Reece | 34 | 1979 |
| 8 | Darren Blakely | 33 | 1998 |
| | John Matias | 33 | 1989 |
| | Terry Derby | 33 | 1983 |
| | Terry Derby | 33 | 1982 |
| | Rick Bass | 33 | 1978 |

Single Game
| Rk | Player | SB | Season | Opponent |
|---|---|---|---|---|
| 1 | Terry Derby | 5 | 1983 | Kearney St. |

== Earned Run Average ==
Career (min. 50 IP)
| Rk | Player | ERA | Seasons |
|---|---|---|---|
| 1 | Tyler Brashears | 1.86 | 2015 |
| 2 | Dylan Thomas | 1.96 | 2017 2018 2019 |
| 3 | Gerald Ako | 2.00 | 1974 1975 1976 1977 |
| 4 | Derek Tatsuno | 2.04 | 1977 1978 1979 |
| 5 | Matt Cooper | 2.29 | 2013 2014 |
| 6 | David Smith | 2.44 | 1979 1980 1981 1983 |
| 7 | Richard Olsen | 2.62 | 1976 1977 1978 |
| 8 | Ben Flores | 2.93 | 1975 1976 |
| 9 | Bryan Duquette | 2.99 | 1980 1981 1982 |
| 10 | Bill Blanchette | 3.01 | 1990 1991 1992 |

Season (min. 20 innings)
| Rk | Player | ERA | Season |
|---|---|---|---|
| 1 | Matt Valencia | 1.03 | 2016 |
| 2 | Gene Smith | 1.05 | 1978 |
| 3 | Brent Harrison | 1.14 | 2012 |
| 4 | Gerald Ako | 1.18 | 1976 |
| 5 | Lenny Linsky | 1.30 | 2011 |
| 6 | Larry Gonzales | 1.35 | 1988 |
| 7 | Darrell Fisherbaugh | 1.45 | 2005 |
| | Derek Tatsuno | 1.45 | 1978 |
| 9 | Casey Ryan | 1.52 | 2017 |
| 10 | Richard Olsen | 1.58 | 1976 |

== Strikeouts ==
Career
| Rk | Player | K | Seasons |
|---|---|---|---|
| 1 | Derek Tatsuno | 541 | 1977 1978 1979 |
| 2 | Bryan Duquette | 332 | 1980 1981 1982 |
| 3 | Andrew McNally | 304 | 1993 1994 1995 1997 |
| 4 | Mike Campbell | 298 | 1983 1984 1985 |
| 5 | Chuck Crim | 290 | 1980 1981 1982 |
| 6 | Scott Karl | 278 | 1990 1991 1992 |
| | Gerald Ako | 278 | 1974 1975 1976 1977 |
| 8 | Mark Johnson | 269 | 1994 1995 1996 |
| 9 | Levon Largusa | 245 | 1990 1991 1992 |
| 10 | Mark Olmos | 231 | 1977 1978 1979 1980 |

Season
| Rk | Player | K | Season |
|---|---|---|---|
| 1 | Derek Tatsuno | 234 | 1979 |
| 2 | Derek Tatsuno | 161 | 1978 |
| 3 | Scott Karl | 146 | 1992 |
| | Derek Tatsuno | 146 | 1977 |
| 5 | Mike Campbell | 145 | 1985 |
| 6 | Mark Johnson | 132 | 1996 |
| 7 | Bryan Duquette | 127 | 1980 |
| 8 | Steven Wright | 123 | 2006 |
| 9 | Mike Campbell | 119 | 1984 |
| 10 | Isaiah Magdaleno | 116 | 2026 |

Single Game
| Rk | Player | K | Season | Opponent |
|---|---|---|---|---|
| 1 | Derek Tatsuno | 20 | 1978 | Oregon |
