= Hawaii Rainbow Warriors baseball =

- 2026 Hawaii Rainbow Warriors baseball team
- Founded: 1923; 103 years ago
- University: University of Hawaii at Manoa
- Athletic director: Matt Elliott
- Head coach: Rich Hill (5th season)
- Conference: Mountain West
- Location: Honolulu, Hawaii
- Home stadium: Les Murakami Stadium (capacity: 4,312)
- Nickname: Rainbow Warriors
- Colors: Green, black, silver, and white

College World Series runner-up
- 1980

College World Series appearances
- 1980

NCAA regional champions
- 1980

NCAA tournament appearances
- 1977, 1979, 1980, 1982, 1984, 1986, 1987, 1989, 1991, 1992, 1993, 2006, 2010

Conference tournament champions
- 1982, 1984, 1987, 1989, 1992, 2010

Conference regular season champions
- 1980, 1982, 1984, 1987, 1992, 2011

For information on all University of Hawaiʻi at Mānoa sports, see Hawaii Rainbow Warriors

The Hawaiʻi Rainbow Warriors baseball team is a varsity intercollegiate athletic team of the University of Hawaiʻi at Mānoa in Honolulu, Hawaii, United States. The team is a member of the Mountain West Conference, which is part of the National Collegiate Athletic Association's Division I. Hawaii's first baseball team was fielded in 1923. The team plays its home games at Les Murakami Stadium in Honolulu, Hawaii. The Rainbow Warriors are coached by Rich Hill.

== Year-by-year results ==
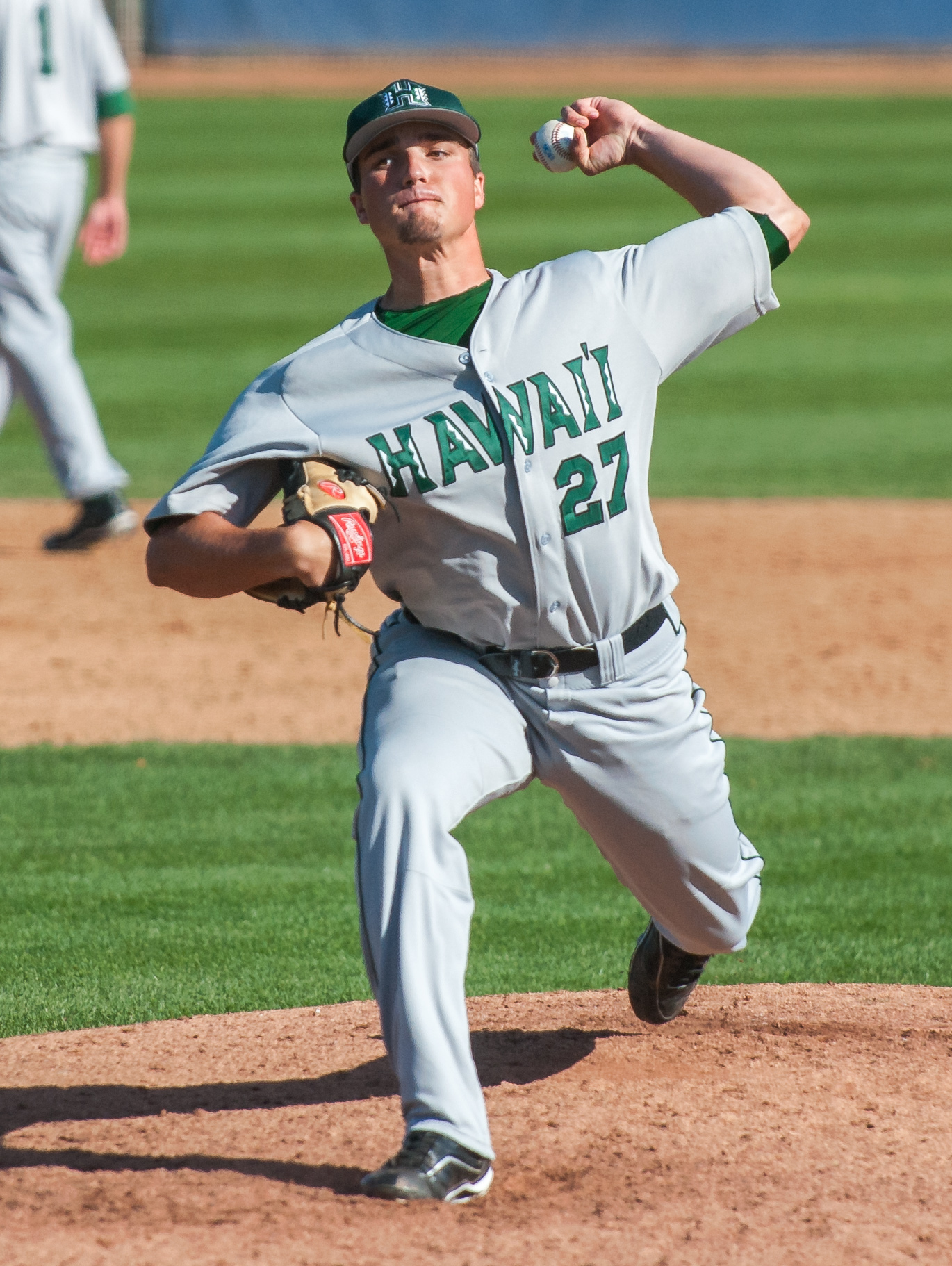
A Hawaii pitcher at George C. Page Stadium in 2011

Record table
Season	Coach	Overall	Conference	Standing	Postseason
1923	Otto Klum	1–2			
1924	Otto Klum	5–5			
1925	Otto Klum	4–7			
1926	Otto Klum	7–5			
1927	Otto Klum	2–9			
1928	Otto Klum	12–5			
1929	Otto Klum	8–7			
1930	Otto Klum	8–4			
1931	Otto Klum	3–11			
1932	Otto Klum	3–2			
1933	Otto Klum	1–10			
1934	Otto Klum	3–6–1			
1935	Otto Klum	6–4			
1936	Otto Klum	4–1			
No program (1937–1937)
1938	Luke Gill	9–2			
1939	Luke Gill	5–6			
No program (1940–1940)
1941	Tom Kaulukukui	9–2			
No program (1942–1945)
1946	Jesse James Kelly	3–4			
1947	Tom Kaulukukui	7–4			
1948	Tom Kaulukukui	18–3			
1949	Tom Kaulukukui	21–9			
1950	Toku Tanaka	12–6			
1951	Toku Tanaka	8–6			
1952	Jerry Burns	3–7			
1953	Jim Asato	3–7			
1954	Thomas Ige	3–16			
1955	Toku Tanaka	5–14			
1956	Toku Tanaka	26–18			
1957	Toku Tanaka	27–19–1			
1958	Toku Tanaka	12–19			
1959	Toku Tanaka	8–20			
1960	Toku Tanaka	17–23			
1961	Henry Tominaga	13–14–1			
1962	Henry Tominaga	11–9–2			
1963	Jyun Hirota	8–13			
No program (1964–1964)
1965	Jyun Hirota	6–5			
1966	Henry Tominaga	13–14			
1967	Henry Tominaga	10–21			
1968	Henry Tominaga	10–23			
1969	Dick Kitamura	8–8			
No program (1970–1970)
NCAA Independent (1971–1979)
1971	Les Murakami	0–4			
1972	Les Murakami	1–3			
1973	Les Murakami	1–7			
1974	Les Murakami	6–11			
1975	Les Murakami	25–13			
1976	Les Murakami	29–12			
1977	Les Murakami	43–13			NCAA Regional (0-2)
1978	Les Murakami	38–14–1			
1979	Les Murakami	69–15			NCAA Regional (2-2)
Western Athletic Conference (1980–2012)
1980	Les Murakami	60–18	19–5	t-1st	WAC (2–0); NCAA Regional (3–0); World Series (3–2)
1981	Les Murakami	50–16	10–5	2nd	WAC South (7–2); WAC (0–2)
1982	Les Murakami	59–17	17–7	1st	WAC (3–0); NCAA Regional (0–2)
1983	Les Murakami	47–20	17–7	2nd	WAC (1–2)
1984	Les Murakami	48–22–1	18–6	1st	WAC (3–1); NCAA Regional (1–2)
1985	Les Murakami	56–31	15–9	2nd	WAC (0–1)
1986	Les Murakami	43–24	15–9	2nd	WAC (5–2); NCAA Regional (2–2)
1987	Les Murakami	45–19	21–2	1st	WAC (3–0); NCAA Regional (1–2)
1988	Les Murakami	45–19	21–6	t-2nd	WAC (0–2)
1989	Les Murakami	40–27	18–10	t-2nd	WAC (4–1); NCAA Regional (0–2)
1990	Les Murakami	37–24–1	17–10–1	4th	WAC (0–2)
1991	Les Murakami	51–18	22–5	1st	WAC (2–2); NCAA Regional (3–2)
1992	Les Murakami	49–14	20–6	1st	WAC (3–1); NCAA Regional (4–2)
1993	Les Murakami	34–25	11–13	4th	NCAA Regional (1–2)
1994	Les Murakami	28–28	8–16	5th	
1995	Les Murakami	30–24	12–17	6th	
1996	Les Murakami	29–26	12–18	5th	
1997	Les Murakami	22–34	14–16	4th	
1998	Les Murakami	34–22	12–18	4th	
1999	Les Murakami	37–20	15–14	5th	WAC (1–2)
2000	Les Murakami	28–28	15–15	4th	
2001	Carl Furutani	29–27	16–20	6th	
2002	Mike Trapasso	16–40	5–25	6th	
2003	Mike Trapasso	30–26	11–19	4th	
2004	Mike Trapasso	31–24	13–16	4th	
2005	Mike Trapasso	28–27	15–14	3rd	
2006	Mike Trapasso	45–17	17–6	2nd	WAC (3–2); NCAA Regional (2–2)
2007	Mike Trapasso	34–25	11–13	t-4th	WAC (1–2)
2008	Mike Trapasso	29–31	18–14	t-2nd	WAC (2–2)
2009	Mike Trapasso	32–26	11–12	5th	
2010	Mike Trapasso	35–28	12–12	4th	WAC (4–1); NCAA Regional (2–2)
2011	Mike Trapasso	34–25	17–7	t-1st	WAC (2–1)
2012	Mike Trapasso	30–25	10–8	4th	WAC (0–2)
Big West Conference (2013–present)
2013	Mike Trapasso	16–35	1–16	7th	
2014	Mike Trapasso	22–31	6–18	8th	
2015	Mike Trapasso	21–32	12–12	5th	
2016	Mike Trapasso	23–30	12–11	6th	
2017	Mike Trapasso	28–23	10–14	T-5th	
2018	Mike Trapasso	27–24	11–13	6th	
2019	Mike Trapasso	20–30	8–16	T-7th	
2020	Mike Trapasso	11–6			Season canceled due to the COVID-19 pandemic.
2021	Mike Trapasso	24–26	16–24	8th	
Rich Hill (Big West) (2022–present)
2022	Rich Hill	28–24	19–11	3rd	
2023	Rich Hill	29–20	18–12	T–5th	
2024	Rich Hill	37–16	20–10	T–3rd	
2025	Rich Hill	35–21	16–14	T–4th	Big West (2–2)
2026	Rich Hill	27–23	16–14	4th	Big West (0–1)
Total:					
National champion Postseason invitational champion Conference regular season champion Conference regular season and conference tournament champion Division regular season champion Division regular season and conference tournament champion Conference tournament champion

== Hawaii in the NCAA tournament ==
Year	Record	Pct	Notes
1977	0–2	.000	West Regional
1979	2–2	.500	Midwest Regional
1980	6–2	.750	College World Series (Runner-up)
1982	0–2	.000	West I Regional
1984	1–2	.333	West II Regional
1986	2–2	.500	West Regional
1987	1–2	.333	West II Regional
1989	0–2	.000	West I Regional
1991	3–2	.600	West I Regional
1992	4–2	.667	West Regional
1993	1–2	.333	Central I Regional
2006	2–2	.500	Corvallis Regional
2010	2–2	.500	Tempe Regional

== Major League Baseball ==
Hawaii has had 119 Major League Baseball draft selections since the draft began in 1965.

Rainbow Warriors in the Major League Baseball Draft
Year	Player	Round	Team
1975	Robert Ehrig	33	Orioles
1975	Tom Bhagwat	9	Giants
1977	Paul Mize	14	Athletics
1977	Gerald Ako	8	Royals
1978	Dean Hall	18	Brewers
1978	Rich Olsen	4	Brewers
1979	Vernon Ramie	12	Blue Jays
1979	Jon Hansen	3	Brewers
1979	Derek Tatsuno	2	Padres
1980	Derek Tatsuno	3	Mets
1980	Ricki Bass	17	Brewers
1980	Kevin Williams	11	Twins
1980	Derek Tatsuno	2	White Sox
1980	Curt Watanabe	7	Brewers
1981	Thad Reece	17	Athletics
1981	Collin Tanabe	5	Brewers
1981	Scott Roberts	2	Brewers
1981	Derek Tatsuno	3	Reds
1982	Chuck Crim	17	Brewers
1982	Bryan Duquette	2	Brewers
1983	Terrence Derby	16	Brewers
1983	Joey Meyer	5	Brewers
1983	Glenn Braggs	2	Brewers
1984	Lance Belen	12	Pirates
1984	Joel Lono	12	Reds
1984	Bob Siegel	8	Mariners
1984	Chuck Jackson	7	Astros
1985	Bruce Walton	16	Athletics
1985	Bob Collum	16	Brewers
1985	Mario Monico	12	Brewers
1985	Greg Burlingame	4	Padres
1985	Mike Campbell	1	Mariners
1986	Mike Reitzel	2	Cubs
1986	Phillip Williams	45	Orioles
1986	Greg Burlingame	31	Cubs
1986	Todd Crosby	5	Phillies
1987	Joey Vierra	31	Reds
1987	Greg Burlingame	24	Mariners
1987	Mark Owens	19	Giants
1987	Daniel Nyssen	7	Astros
1987	Paul Brown	2	Red Sox
1988	Steve Morris	35	Twins
1988	Robert Lipscomb	22	Brewers
1988	Larry Gonzales	22	Angels
1988	Daniel Kapea	11	Brewers
1989	Rocky Ynclan	36	Brewers
1990	Jeffrey Ball	33	Angels
1990	Brian Souza	11	Brewers
1991	Tim Albert	18	Brewers
1992	William Blanchette	43	Angels
1992	Jay Holland	32	Rockies
1992	Scott Karl	6	Brewers
1992	Levon Largusa	3	Blue Jays
1993	Kenny Harrison	33	Twins
1993	Matt Apana	22	Mariners
1994	Tyler Cheff	53	Indians
1994	Shawn Rogers	22	Red Sox
1994	Bobby Moore	17	Red Sox
1995	Jason Ross	65	Brewers
1995	Ken Morimoto	28	Dodgers
1995	Bobby Moore	23	Rangers
1996	Paul Ah Yat	21	Pirates
1996	Jason Ross	13	Braves
1996	Mark Johnson	1	Astros
1997	Robert Medeiros	38	Braves
1997	Jay Spurgeon	8	Orioles
1998	Randon Ho	35	Indians
1998	Darren Blakely	5	Angels
1999	Jamie Aloy	48	Giants
1999	Randon Ho	29	Phillies
1999	Lars Hansen	28	Giants
1999	Dusty Bergman	6	Angels
2001	Jeff Coleman	21	Athletics
2002	Grady Symonds	39	Diamondbacks
2003	Tim Montgomery	23	Indians
2003	Brian Bock	14	Orioles
2003	Justin Azze	7	Orioles
2004	Colby Summer	38	Red Sox
2004	Clary Carlsen	33	Phillies
2004	Brian Finegan	15	Indians
2005	Stephen Bryant	20	Athletics
2005	Isaac Omura	17	Athletics
2006	Darrell Fisherbaugh	50	Red Sox
2006	Esteban Lopez	25	Dodgers
2006	Matt Inouye	21	White Sox
2006	Steven Wright	2	Indians
2007	Justin Frash	27	Athletics
2007	Ian Harrington	23	Diamondbacks
2007	Tyler Davis	21	Padres
2008	Landon Hernandez	50	Tigers
2008	Brandon Haislet	23	Phillies
2008	Jonathan Hee	21	Red Sox
2008	Matt Daly	13	Blue Jays
2009	Sam Spangler	20	Pirates
2009	Vinnie Catricala	10	Mariners
2010	Sam Spangler	41	Twins
2010	David Freitas	15	Nationals
2010	Greg Garcia	7	Cardinals
2010	Josh Slaats	5	Rockies
2011	Connor Little	49	Marlins
2011	Alex Capaul	43	Diamondbacks
2011	Randall Yard	36	Reds
2011	Michael Blake	16	Diamondbacks
2011	Blair Walters	11	White Sox
2011	Lenny Linsky	2	Rays
2011	Kolten Wong	1	Cardinals
2012	Breland Almadova	37	Diamondbacks
2012	Matt Sisto	20	Phillies
2014	Marc Flores	30	White Sox
2014	Matt Cooper	16	White Sox
2014	Scott Squier	16	Marlins
2015	Quintin Torres-Costa	35	Brewers
2015	LJ Brewster	22	Marlins
2015	Tyler Brashears	14	Rays
2017	Casey Ryan	18	Cubs
2017	Josh Rojas	26	Astros
2018	Kekai Rios	28	Brewers
2018	Dylan Thomas	38	Twins
2019	Dylan Thomas	13	Twins
2020	Jeremy Wu-Yellend	4	Red Sox

== See also ==
- List of NCAA Division I baseball programs
