= 1947 Humboldt State Lumberjacks football team =

American college football season

1947 Humboldt State Lumberjacks football
- Conference: Far Western Conference
- Record: 5–4 (2–2 FWC)
- Head coach: Joseph Forbes (2nd season)
- Home stadium: Redwood Bowl

1947 Far Western Conference football standings
| | Conf. | | | | | Overall |
| Team | W | | L | | T | W | | L | | T |
|---|---|---|---|---|---|---|---|---|---|---|
| Southern Oregon + | 3 | – | 1 | – | 0 | 7 | – | 3 | – | 0 |
| Cal Aggies + | 3 | – | 1 | – | 0 | 4 | – | 5 | – | 0 |
| Humboldt State | 2 | – | 2 | – | 0 | 5 | – | 4 | – | 0 |
| Chico State | 1 | – | 3 | – | 0 | 4 | – | 5 | – | 0 |
| San Francisco State | 1 | – | 3 | – | 0 | 2 | – | 5 | – | 0 |
+ – Conference co-champions

The 1947 Humboldt State Lumberjacks football team represented Humboldt State College—now known as California State Polytechnic University, Humboldt—as a member of the Far Western Conference (FWC) during the 1947 college football season. Led by Joseph Forbes in his second and final season as head coach, the Lumberjacks compiled an overall record of 5–4 with a mark of 2–2 in conference play, placing third in the FWC, and outscored their opponents 159 to 131 for the season. The team played home games at the Redwood Bowl in Arcata, California.

In the final Litkenhous Ratings released in mid-December, Humboldt was ranked at No. 392 out of 500 college football teams.

Forbes finished his two-year tenure with an overall record of 10–7–1 (.583).

== Schedule ==
| Date | Opponent | Site | Result | Source |
|---|---|---|---|---|
| September 28 | San Francisco JV* | Redwood Bowl; Arcata, CA | W 46–0 | |
| October 4 | at Oregon College* | McArthur Field; Monmouth, OR | W 27–7 | |
| October 10 | at Southern Oregon | Walter E. Phillips Field?; Ashland, OR | L 6–16 | |
| October 18 | Chico State | Redwood Bowl; Arcata, CA | W 14–0 | |
| October 25 | San Francisco State | Redwood Bowl; Arcata, CA | W 19–0 | |
| November 1 | Cal Aggies | Redwood Bowl; Arcata, CA | L 7–12 | |
| November 8 | California JV (Note: The University of California JV team was commonly known as the "Cal Ramblers".)* | Redwood Bowl; Arcata, CA | L 13–20 | |
| November 11 | at Saint Mary's JV* | Moraga, CA | W 27–20 | |
| November 15 | at Pepperdine* | Sentinel Field; Inglewood, CA | L 0–56 | |
*Non-conference game
