= Mitchell Stadium (Montana) =

Football stadium in Anaconda, Montana, US

- Anaconda High School Stadium
- Interactive map of Mitchell Stadium
- Former names: N/A
- Address: 1101-1199 W 5th St; Anaconda, Montana; United States
- Location: Anaconda, Montana
- Coordinates: 46.12846129780933°N 112.96937486168805°W
- Elevation: around 5,250 feet
- Owner: Anaconda High School, City of Anaconda, Deer Lodge County
- Operator: Anaconda High School, Anaconda WPA, Deer Lodge County
- Seating type: bleachers and stands
- Capacity: Unknown, estimated 4,400 to 6,000 (with extra temporary bleachers)
- Executive suites: N/A
- Type: outdoor football stadium
- Surface: Grass
- Scoreboard: Yes
- Record attendance: Unknown
- Field shape: rectangle with track

Construction
- Opened: September 16, 1939
- Renovated: 2018 after a rail line was found
- Reopened: 2018 after a rail line was found
- Architectural style: Art Deco
- Architect: W.E. Mitchell

Tenant
- Anaconda High School

Mitchell Stadium is an outdoor multi-purpose high school venue in Anaconda, Montana. The stadium supports mainly Anaconda's football and track teams.

== History ==
Mitchell Stadium was created as a Works Progress Administration project from 1938-1939. The stadium was designed and named after W.E. Mitchell, superintendent of Anaconda Reduction Works. He and others part of the ARW designed the stadium. The stadium was built and made in co-operation between the WPA, Deer Lodge County, and City of Anaconda. Progress on the stadium began in 1937 and took two years to be built. The stadium was finished in 1939 and designated in Anaconda Copperhead's football game against Central High School of Butte as well as a team night scrimmage shortly following that game. Since then, the stadium has undergone minor renovations, including one in 2018 after potentially contaminated railroad tracks were found under the stadium.

== Structural details ==
Mitchell Stadium is estimated to sit around 4,000 to 6,000 people, with a possible extra 2,000 coming from temporary bleachers. The stadium itself covers four city blocks, an original six lights on 10 poles using around 90,000 watts, a parking lot the size of two city blocks to fit around 1,200 vehicles, and a rubber track. The stadium encompasses the Art Deco architectural style

== Events and uses ==
As of 2026, Mitchell Stadium is used mainly by Anaconda's junior high and high school football and track teams. However, the stadium has been used for other events in the past. In the early days of the stadium, land closely near it was used for City Baseball League games temporarily before the league created a field near the Washington School. Additionally, the stadium has been used for Anaconda's Smeltermen's Day celebrations and Montana Special Olympics competitions. In addition to small Montana events, the stadium also hosted the 1947 Portland Pilots, a team representing the University of Portland in a game against the 1947 Montana State Bobcats.
