= List of Hawaii Rainbow Warriors head football coaches =

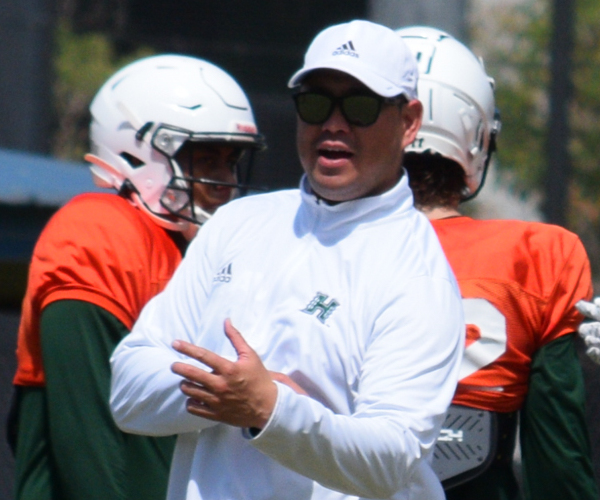
Timmy Chang, 25th head coach of the Hawaii Rainbow Warriors

The Hawaii Rainbow Warriors college football team represents the University of Hawaiʻi at Mānoa (Hawaii) in the Mountain West Conference (Mountain West). The Warriors compete as part of the National Collegiate Athletic Association (NCAA) Football Bowl Subdivision (FBS). The program has had 22 head coaches since it began play during the 1909 season. Timmy Chang was hired in January 2022 as the head coach at Hawaii.

Since 1909, five coaches have led the Warriors in postseason bowl games: Bob Wagner, June Jones, Greg McMackin, Nick Rolovich, and Chang. Two of those coaches also won conference championships: Jones and McMackin won or shared a combined three as a member of the Mountain West.

Otto Klum is the leader in seasons coached and games won, with 84 victories during his 19 years with the program. Dave Crawford has the highest winning percentage of those who have coached more than one game, with .857. Fred von Appen has the lowest winning percentage of those who have coached more than one game, with .139. Of the 22 different head coaches who have led the Warriors Clark Shaughnessy has been inducted into the College Football Hall of Fame in South Bend, Indiana.

== Key ==
Key to symbols in coaches list
General		Overall		Conference		Postseason (Note: Although the first Rose Bowl Game was played in 1902, it has been continuously played since the 1916 game, and is recognized as the oldest bowl game by the NCAA. "—" indicates any season prior to 1916 when postseason games were not played.)	
No.	Order of coaches (Note: A running total of the number of head coaches, with coaches who served separate tenures being counted only once. Interim head coaches are represented with "Int" and are not counted in the running total. "—" indicates the team played but either without a coach or no coach is on record. "X" indicates an interim year without play.)	GC	Games coached	CW	Conference wins	PW	Postseason wins
DC	Division championships	OW	Overall wins	CL	Conference losses	PL	Postseason losses
CC	Conference championships	OL	Overall losses	CT	Conference ties	PT	Postseason ties
NC	National championships	OT	Overall ties (Note: Overtime rules in college football were introduced in 1996, making ties impossible in the period since.)	C%	Conference winning percentage		
†	Elected to the College Football Hall of Fame	O%	Overall winning percentage (Note: When computing the win–loss percentage, a tie counts as half a win and half a loss.)				

== Coaches ==
List of head football coaches showing season(s) coached, overall records, conference records, postseason records, championships and selected awards (Note: Statistics correct as of the end of the 2013 NCAA Division I FBS football season.)
No.	Name	Term	G	W	L	T	PCT	CW	CL	CT	PCT	PW	PL	PT	CCs	NCs	Awards
1	Austin Jones	1909–1911	14	8	6	0	0.571	—	—	—	—	0	0	0	—	0	—
2	John Peden	1915	7	5	1	1	0.786	—	—	—	—	0	0	0	—	0	—
3	William Britton	1916	6	3	2	1	0.583	—	—	—	—	0	0	—	0	—	
4	Dave Crawford	1917–1919	14	11	1	2	0.857	—	—	—	—	0	0	0	—	0	—
5	Raymond Elliot	1920	8	6	3	0	0.750	—	—	—	—	0	0	0	—	0	—
6	Otto Klum	1921–1939	142	84	51	7	0.616	—	—	—	—	0	0	0	—	0	—
7	Eugene Gill	1940–1941	16	10	6	0	0.625	—	—	—	—	0	0	0	—	0	—
8	Tom Kaulukukui	1941; 1946–1950	64	42	19	3	0.680	—	—	—	—	0	0	0	—	0	—
9	Archie Kodros	1951	11	4	7	0	0.364	—	—	—	—	0	0	0	—	0	—
10	Hank Vasconcellos	1952–1960	92	44	45	3	0.495	—	—	—	—	0	0	0	—	0	—
11	Jim Asato	1962–1964	27	15	12	0	0.556	—	—	—	—	0	0	0	—	0	—
12	Clark Shaughnessy^{†}	1965	10	1	8	1	0.150	—	—	—	—	0	0	0	—	0	—
13	Phil Sarboe	1966	10	4	6	0	0.400	—	—	—	—	0	0	0	—	0	—
14	Don King	1967	10	6	4	0	0.600	—	—	—	—	0	0	0	—	0	—
15	Dave Holmes	1968–1973	64	46	17	1	0.727	—	—	—	—	0	0	0	—	0	—
16	Larry Price	1974–1976	33	15	18	0	0.455	—	—	—	—	0	0	0	—	0	—
17	Dick Tomey	1977–1986	112	63	46	3	0.576	33	24	2	0.576	0	0	0	0	0	WAC Coach of the Year (1981)
18	Bob Wagner	1987–1995	110	58	49	3	0.541	31	40	1	0.438	1	1	0	0	0	WAC Coach of the Year (1989, 1992)
19	Fred von Appen	1996–1998	36	5	31	—	0.139	2	22	—	0.083	0	0	—	0	0	—
20	June Jones	1999–2007	117	76	41	—	0.650	47	24	—	0.662	4	2	—	2	0	Sporting News College Football Coach of the Year (1999); American Football Coach/Schutt Sports National COY (1999); CNN/SI National Coach of the Year (1999); WAC Coach of the Year (1999, 2006, 2007)
21	Greg McMackin	2008–2011	54	29	25	—	0.537	18	13	—	0.581	0	2	—	1	0	—
22	Norm Chow	2012–2015	46	10	36	—	0.217	4	26	—	0.133	0	0	—	0	0	—
23	Chris Naeole	2015	4	1	3	—	0.250	0	3	—	.000	0	0	—	0	0	—
24	Nick Rolovich	2016–2019	55	28	27	—	0.509	15	17	—	0.469	2	1	—	0	0	Mountain West Coach of the Year (2019)
25	Todd Graham	2020–2021	22	11	11	—	0.500	7	9	—	0.438	1	0	—	0	0	—
26	Timmy Chang	2022–present	51	22	29	—	0.431	13	18	—	0.419	1	0	—	0	0	—
