= 1947 Chico State Wildcats football team =

American college football season

1947 Chico State Wildcats football
- Conference: Far Western Conference
- Record: 4–5 (1–3 FWC)
- Head coach: Roy Bohler (6th season)
- Home stadium: Chico High School Stadium

1947 Far Western Conference football standings
	Conf.					Overall
Team	W		L		T	W		L		T
Southern Oregon +	3	–	1	–	0	7	–	3	–	0
Cal Aggies +	3	–	1	–	0	4	–	5	–	0
Humboldt State	2	–	2	–	0	5	–	4	–	0
Chico State	1	–	3	–	0	4	–	5	–	0
San Francisco State	1	–	3	–	0	2	–	5	–	0
+ – Conference co-champions

The 1947 Chico State Wildcats football team represented Chico State College—now known as California State University, Chico—as a member of the Far Western Conference (FWC) during the 1947 college football season. Led by sixth-year head coach Roy Bohler, Chico State compiled an overall record of 4–5 with a mark of 1–3 in conference play, tying for fourth place in the FWC. The team was outscored by its opponents 111 to 109 for the season.

In the final Litkenhous Ratings released in mid-December, Chico State was ranked at No. 485 out of 500 college football teams.

The Wildcats played home games at Chico High School Stadium in Chico, California.

== Schedule ==
Date	Opponent	Site	Result	Source
September 27	Hamilton Field (Note: Hamilton Army Airfield was a United States Air Force Base from 1934 to 1974.)*	Chico High School Stadium; Chico, CA	W 46–0	
October 4	Cal Poly San Dimas*	Chico High School Stadium; Chico, CA	W 19–0	
October 11	Saint Mary's JV*	Chico High School Stadium; Chico, CA	L 0–13	
October 17	at Humboldt State	Redwood Bowl; Arcata, CA	L 0–14	
October 24	California JV (Note: The University of California JV team was commonly known as the "Cal Ramblers".)*	Chico High School Stadium; Chico, CA	L 9–30	
November 1	San Francisco State	Chico High School Stadium; Chico, CA	L 0–7	
November 8	Cal Aggies	Chico High School Stadium; Chico, CA	W 12–7	
November 15	at Southern Oregon	Walter E. Phillips Field?; Ashland, OR	L 12–40	
November 22	Mather Field (Note: Mather Air Force Base was a United States Air Force Base from 1918 to 1993)*	Chico High School Stadium; Chico, CA	W 20–0	
*Non-conference game
