= 1947 San Diego State Aztecs football team =

American college football season

1947 San Diego State Aztecs football

Harbor Bowl, L 0–53 vs. Hardin–Simmons
- Conference: California Collegiate Athletic Association
- Record: 7–3–1 (2–2–1 CCAA)
- Head coach: Bill Schutte (1st season)
- Home stadium: Aztec Bowl

1947 California Collegiate Athletic Association football standings
	Conf.					Overall
Team	W		L		T	W		L		T
Pacific (CA) $	5	–	0	–	0	10	–	1	–	0
San Jose State	3	–	2	–	0	9	–	3	–	0
Fresno State	2	–	1	–	2	3	–	6	–	2
San Diego State	2	–	2	–	1	7	–	3	–	1
Santa Barbara	1	–	3	–	1	4	–	3	–	1
Cal Poly	0	–	5	–	0	1	–	9	–	0
$ – Conference champion

The 1947 San Diego State Aztecs football team represented San Diego State College (Note: San Diego State University was known as San Diego State College from 1935 to 1971.) during the 1947 college football season.

San Diego State competed in the California Collegiate Athletic Association (CCAA). The team was led by first-year head coach Bill Schutte, and played home games at both Aztec Bowl and Balboa Stadium. They finished the season with seven wins, three losses and one tie (7–3–1, 2–2–1 CCAA). Overall, the team outscored its opponents 191–156 for the season. At the end of the season, the Aztecs were chosen to play in the 1948 Harbor Bowl against the Hardin–Simmons Cowboys. The game was played at Balboa Stadium in San Diego, California on January 1, 1948. The Aztecs were beaten 0–53 in the game.

In the final Litkenhous Ratings released in mid-December, San Diego State was ranked at No. 130 out of 500 college football teams.

== Schedule ==
Date	Opponent	Site	Result	Attendance	Source
September 19	at Utah State*	Aggie Stadium; Logan, UT	W 24–19	12,000	
October 4	Cal Poly	Aztec Bowl; San Diego, CA	W 56–13	11,000	
October 11	at Pacific (CA)	Baxter Stadium; Stockton, CA	L 0–13	8,000	
October 18	Occidental*	Aztec Bowl; San Diego, CA	W 14–0	8,000	
October 25	San Jose State	Balboa Stadium; San Diego, CA	L 7–32	25,000	
November 1	at Fresno State	Ratcliffe Stadium; Fresno, CA (rivalry)	T 7–7	4,307	
November 8	Loyola (CA)*	Aztec Bowl; San Diego, CA	W 13–12	7,000	
November 15	Whittier*^{†}	Aztec Bowl; San Diego, CA	W 19–0	7,000	
November 22	BYU*	Balboa Stadium; San Diego, CA	W 32–7	8,000	
November 29	Santa Barbara	Balboa Stadium; San Diego, CA	W 19–0	10,000	
January 1, 1948	Hardin–Simmons*	Balboa Stadium; San Diego, CA	L 0–53	12,000	
*Non-conference game; ^{†}Homecoming
