= 1947 Santa Clara Broncos football team =

American college football season

1947 Santa Clara Broncos football
- Conference: Independent
- Record: 4–4
- Head coach: Len Casanova (2nd season)
- Home stadium: Kezar Stadium

1947 Western major college football independents records
| | Conf. | | | Overall |
| Team | W | L | T | W | | L | | T |
|---|---|---|---|---|---|---|---|---|
| Nevada | | – | | 7 | – | 2 | – | 0 |
| San Francisco | | – | | 7 | – | 3 | – | 0 |
| Santa Clara | | – | | 4 | – | 4 | – | 0 |
| Saint Mary's | | – | | 3 | – | 7 | – | 0 |
| Portland | | – | | 1 | – | 7 | – | 0 |

The 1947 Santa Clara Broncos football team was an American football team that represented Santa Clara University as an independent during the 1947 college football season. In its second season under head coach Len Casanova, the team compiled a 4–4 record and was outscored by a total of 158 to 109.

Santa Clara was ranked at No. 73 (out of 500 college football teams) in the final Litkenhous Ratings for 1947.

The team played its three home games at Kezar Stadium at San Francisco.

== Schedule ==
| Date | Opponent | Site | Result | Attendance | Source |
|---|---|---|---|---|---|
| September 20 | at California | California Memorial Stadium; Berkeley, CA | L 7–33 | 40,000 | |
| September 27 | SMU | Kezar Stadium; San Francisco, CA | L 6–22 | 5,000 | |
| October 4 | at Fresno State | Ratcliffe Stadium; Fresno, CA | W 20–19 | | |
| October 11 | at Stanford | Stanford Stadium; Stanford, CA | W 13–7 | 25,000 | |
| October 18 | at Pacific (CA) | Baxter Stadium; Stockton, CA | W 21–20 | | |
| November 1 | vs. San Francisco | Kezar Stadium; San Francisco, CA | L 9–20 | 25,000 | |
| November 8 | at Michigan State | Macklin Field; East Lansing, MI | L 0–28 | 21,000 | |
| November 16 | vs. Saint Mary's | Kezar Stadium; San Francisco, CA | W 33–9 | 40,000 | |
