= 1947 San Francisco State Gators football team =

American college football season

1947 San Francisco State Gators football
- Conference: Far Western Conference
- Record: 2–5 (1–3 FWC)
- Head coach: Dick Boyle (5th season)
- Home stadium: Cox Stadium

1947 Far Western Conference football standings
	Conf.					Overall
Team	W		L		T	W		L		T
Southern Oregon +	3	–	1	–	0	7	–	3	–	0
Cal Aggies +	3	–	1	–	0	4	–	5	–	0
Humboldt State	2	–	2	–	0	5	–	4	–	0
Chico State	1	–	3	–	0	4	–	5	–	0
San Francisco State	1	–	3	–	0	2	–	5	–	0
+ – Conference co-champions

The 1947 San Francisco State Gators football team represented San Francisco State College—now known as San Francisco State University—as a member of the Far Western Conference (FWC) during the 1947 college football season. Led by fifth-year head coach Dick Boyle, San Francisco State compiled an overall record of 2–5 with a mark of 1–3 in conference play, tying for fourth place in the FWC. For the season the team was outscored by its opponents 117 to 33. The Gators played home games at Cox Stadium in San Francisco.

== Schedule ==
Date	Opponent	Site	Result	Source
September 27	at Whittier*	Hadley Field; Whittier, CA	L 0–13	
October 4	Naval Air Station Alameda (Note: Naval Air Station Alameda was a Naval Air Station from 1940 to 1997. For many years they fielded a team that played against colleges and other military teams.)*	?	L 0–34	
October 11	Cal Aggies	Cox Stadium; San Francisco, CA	L 0–20	
October 18	at Cal Poly*	Mustang Stadium; San Luis Obispo, CA	W 19–18	
October 25	at Humboldt State	Redwood Bowl; Arcata, CA	L 0–19	
November 1	at Chico State	Chico High School Stadium; Chico, CA	W 7–0	
November 8	Southern Oregon	Cox Stadium; San Francisco, CA	L 7–13	
*Non-conference game
