= 1947 Santa Barbara Gauchos football team =

American college football season

1947 Santa Barbara Gauchos football
- Conference: California Collegiate Athletic Association
- Record: 4–3–1 (1–3–1 CCAA)
- Head coach: Stan Williamson (3rd season)
- Home stadium: La Playa Stadium

1947 California Collegiate Athletic Association football standings
	Conf.					Overall
Team	W		L		T	W		L		T
Pacific (CA) $	5	–	0	–	0	10	–	1	–	0
San Jose State	3	–	2	–	0	9	–	3	–	0
Fresno State	2	–	1	–	2	3	–	6	–	2
San Diego State	2	–	2	–	1	7	–	3	–	1
Santa Barbara	1	–	3	–	1	4	–	3	–	1
Cal Poly	0	–	5	–	0	1	–	9	–	0
$ – Conference champion

The 1947 UC Santa Barbara Gauchos football team represented Santa Barbara College (Note: University of California, Santa Barbara was known as Santa Barbara College of the University of California from 1944 to 1957.) during the 1947 college football season.

Santa Barbara competed in the California Collegiate Athletic Association (CCAA). The team was led by third-year head coach Stan Williamson and played home games at La Playa Stadium in Santa Barbara, California. They finished the season with a record of four wins, three losses and one tie (4–3–1, 1–3–1 CCAA).

In the final Litkenhous Ratings released in mid-December, Santa Barbara was ranked at No. 198 out of 500 college football teams.

== Schedule ==
Date	Opponent	Site	Result	Attendance	Source
October 3	Pomona*	La Playa Stadium; Santa Barbara, CA	W 26–13		
October 10	Occidental*	La Playa Stadium; Santa Barbara, CA	W 17–14		
October 17	at San Jose State	Spartan Stadium; San Jose, CA	L 0–39		
October 25	Cal Aggies	A Street field; Davis, CA	W 26–14		
November 1	Cal Poly*	La Playa Stadium; Santa Barbara, CA	W 53–14		
November 7	Pacific (CA)*	La Playa Stadium; Santa Barbara, CA	L 19–44		
November 15	Fresno State	La Playa Stadium; Santa Barbara, CA	T 7–7		
November 29	at San Diego State	Balboa Stadium; San Diego, CA	L 0–19	10,000	
*Non-conference game
