= Tom Kaʻulukukui =

American football player and coach (1913–2007)

- Kaʻulukukui in 1982

Biographical details
- Born: January 22, 1913; Honolulu, Hawaii Territory, U.S.
- Died: March 9, 2007 (aged 94); Kailua, Hawaii, U.S.
- Education: University of Hawaiʻi at Mānoa

Playing career

Football
- 1934–1937: Hawaii
- Position: Halfback

Coaching career (HC unless noted)

Football
- 1941: Hawaii
- 1946–1950: Hawaii (Note: Co-head coach with Eugene Gill)
- 1956–1959: ʻIolani

Baseball
- 1941: Hawaii
- 1947–1949: Hawaii

Administrative career (AD unless noted)
- 1949–1951: Hawaii

Head coaching record
- Overall: Football: 42–19–3
- Bowls: 3–2

Accomplishments and honors

Awards
- Hawaii Rainbow Warriors No. 32 retired

Thomas Kaʻauwai Kaʻulukukui Sr. (January 22, 1913 – March 9, 2007) was an American football player and coach. He served as the head coach at the University of Hawaiʻi in 1941, as co-head coach with Eugene Gill, and from 1946 to 1950. From 1956 to 1959 he served as head coach of ʻIolani preparatory school in Honolulu.

== Biography ==
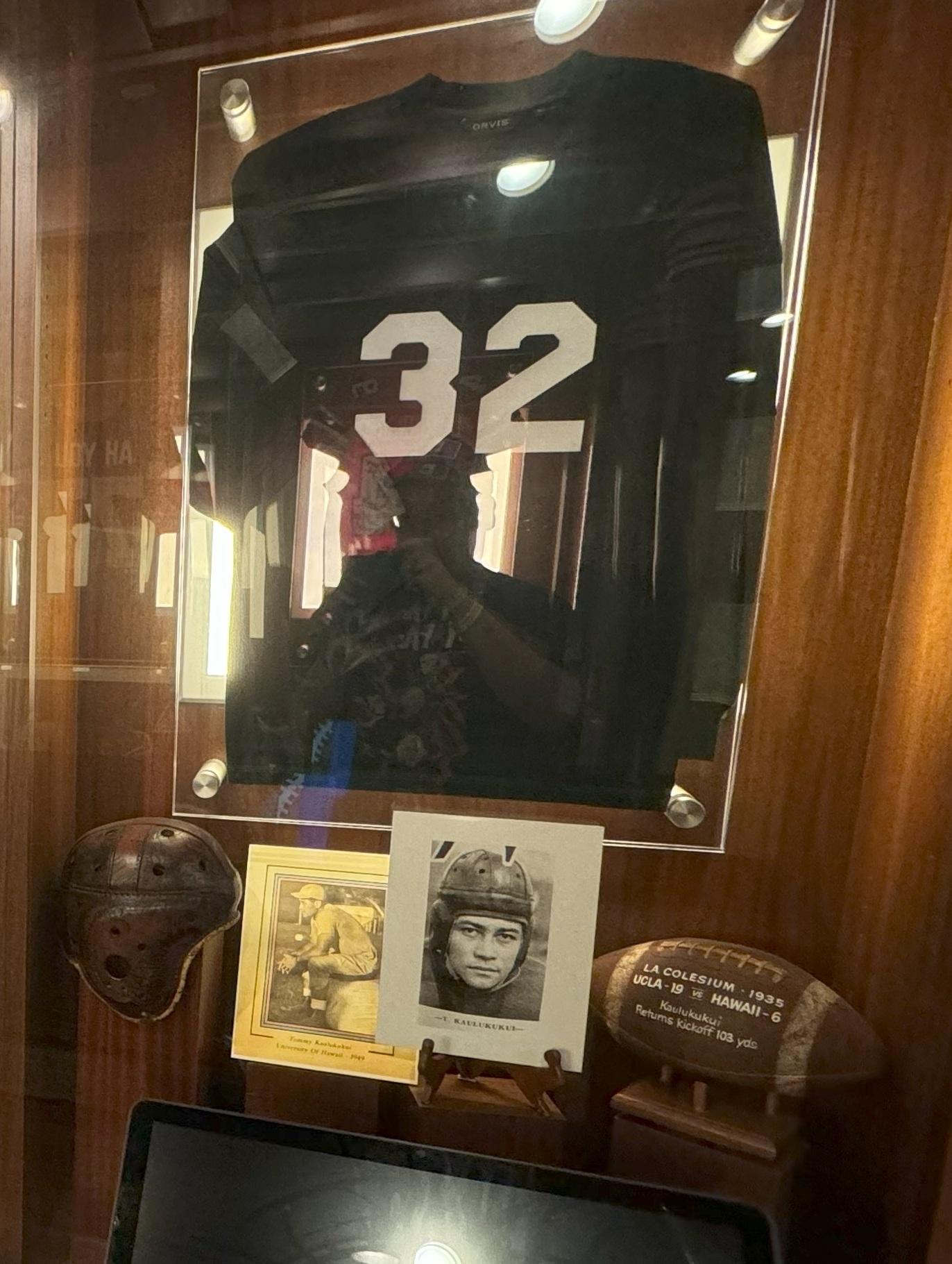
Exhibit for Kaʻulukukui at the Polynesian Football Hall of Fame

Kaʻulukukui was a standout college athlete who earned 17 letters in five sports and was the University of Hawaii's first All-American football player. He was nicknamed "Grass Shack" by legendary sportswriter Grantland Rice. His number, #32, is only one of two numbers to have ever been retired by the Hawaii football program. He was inducted into the University of Hawai'i Sports Circle of Honor in 1981 and the Polynesian Football Hall of Fame in 2021.

During World War II, he served as a lieutenant in the United States Army Corps of Engineers. Prior to joining the Army, he was in a work battalion with Japanese-Americans who were not permitted to volunteer for the military. After his coaching stint at Hawaii ended, Kaʻulukukui ran an insurance agency before being appointed as federal marshal for the District of Hawaii in 1959. Kaʻulukukui was also a trustee for the Office of Hawaiian Affairs for 12 years and was chairman in 1989.

== Head coaching record ==
Year	Team	Overall	Conference	Standing	Bowl/playoffs
Hawaii Rainbows (Independent) (1941)
1941	Hawaii	8–1			
Hawaii Rainbows (Independent) (1946–1950)
1946	Hawaii	8–2			W Pineapple
1947	Hawaii	8–5			W Pineapple
1948	Hawaii	7–4–1			L Pineapple
1949	Hawaii	6–3			L Pineapple
1950	Hawaii	5–4–2			W Pineapple
Hawaii:		42–19–3			
Total:		42–19–3			
