= 1947 Pacific Tigers football team =

American college football season

1947 Pacific Tigers football

CCAA champion

Grape Bowl, W 35–21 vs. Utah State Raisin Bowl, W 26–14 vs. Wichita
- Conference: California Collegiate Athletic Association
- Record: 10–1 (5–0 CCAA)
- Head coach: Larry Siemering (1st season)
- Home stadium: Baxter Stadium

1947 California Collegiate Athletic Association football standings
	Conf.					Overall
Team	W		L		T	W		L		T
Pacific (CA) $	5	–	0	–	0	10	–	1	–	0
San Jose State	3	–	2	–	0	9	–	3	–	0
Fresno State	2	–	1	–	2	3	–	6	–	2
San Diego State	2	–	2	–	1	7	–	3	–	1
Santa Barbara	1	–	3	–	1	4	–	3	–	1
Cal Poly	0	–	5	–	0	1	–	9	–	0
$ – Conference champion

The 1947 Pacific Tigers football team was an American football team that represented the College of the Pacific—now known as the University of the Pacific—as a member of the California Collegiate Athletic Association (CCAA) during the 1947 college football season. In their first season under head coach Larry Siemering, the Tigers compiled an overall record of 10–1 with a mark 5–0 in conference play, winning the CCAA title. They outscored all opponents by a combined total of 373 to 111. At the end of the season, the Tigers were invited to two different bowl games. The first was the Grape Bowl in Lodi, California versus Utah State. The second was a New Year's Day (1948) game, the Raisin Bowl in Fresno, California against Wichita. The Tigers were victorious in both of the bowl games.

Pacific was ranked at No. 60 (out of 500 college football teams) in the final Litkenhous Ratings for 1947.

== Schedule ==
Date	Opponent	Site	Result	Attendance	Source
September 26	Willamette*	Baxter Stadium; Stockton, CCA	W 56–0		
October 3	at Loyola (CA)*	Gilmore Stadium; Los Angeles, CA	W 25–7	12,000	
October 11	San Diego State	Baxter Stadium; Stockton, CA	W 13–0	8,000	
October 18	Santa Clara*^{†}	Baxter Stadium; Stockton, CA	L 20–21		
October 25	at Cal Poly	Mustang Stadium; San Luis Obispo, CA	W 41–7		
October 31	at San Jose State	Spartan Stadium; San Jose, CA (rivalry)	W 14–0		
November 7	at Santa Barbara	La Playa Stadium; Santa Barbara, CA	W 44–19		
November 14	South Dakota*	Baxter Stadium; Stockton, CA	W 52–0	8,000	
November 21	Fresno State	Baxter Stadium; Stockton, CA	W 47–22		
December 13	Utah State*	Grape Bowl; Lodi, CA (Grape Bowl)	W 35–21	12,000	
January 1	vs. Wichita*	Ratcliffe Stadium; Fresno, CA (Raisin Bowl)	W 26–14	13,000	
*Non-conference game; ^{†}Homecoming
