= 1947 Redlands Bulldogs football team =

American college football season

1947 Redlands Bulldogs football

Pineapple Bowl, L 32–33 vs. Hawaii
- Conference: Southern California Conference
- Record: 6–3 (4–0 SCC)
- Head coach: Cecil A. Cushman (15th season)
- Home stadium: Orange Show Stadium

1947 Southern California Conference football standings
	Conf.					Overall
Team	W		L		T	W		L		T
Redlands $	4	–	0	–	0	6	–	3	–	0
Occidental	2	–	1	–	1	4	–	3	–	1
Pomona	1	–	2	–	1	3	–	3	–	1
Whittier	1	–	2	–	1	2	–	6	–	1
Caltech	0	–	3	–	1	1	–	5	–	1
$ – Conference champion

The 1947 Redlands Bulldogs football team was an American football team that represented the University of Redlands as a member of the Southern California Conference (SCC) during the 1947 college football season. Under longtime head coach Cecil A. Cushman, the team compiled a 6–3 record (4–0 against SCC opponents) and lost a close game to Hawaii in the fourth annual Pineapple Bowl on January 1, 1948. The team divided its home games between the Orange Show Stadium in San Bernardino, California, and a site on the school's campus in Redlands, California.

End Stan Flowers ranked as the top pass receiver during the 1947 season among small college players with 44 receptions for 493 yards. Halfback Ted Runner ranked second among the country's small college players with 942 passing yards (84 completions out of 150 passes). Runner was a second-team honoree on the Little All-America team who later became the school's football coach and athletic director. In 1988, the school's football stadium was named in his honor.

== Schedule ==
Date	Opponent	Site	Result	Attendance	Source
September 27	Los Angeles City College*	Orange Show Stadium; San Bernardino, CA	W 20–14	2,000	
October 4	at Pepperdine*	Sentinel Field; Inglewood, CA	L 6–21		
October 11	La Verne*	Redlands campus; Redlands, CA	W 40–7	2,000	
October 17	at Loyola (CA)*	Gilmore Stadium; Los Angeles, CA	L 16–19	5,500	
October 25	Pomona^{†}	Orange Show Stadium; San Bernardino, CA	W 19–18	7,000	
November 8	at Occidental	Eagle Rock, Los Angeles, CA	W 8–7		
November 15	Caltech*	Redlands, CA	W 20–13	3,500	
November 22	at Whittier	Patterson Field; Whittier, CA	W 7–6		
January 1, 1948	at Hawaii*	Honolulu Stadium; Honolulu, Territory of Hawaii (Pineapple Bowl)	L 32–33	12,000	
*Non-conference game; ^{†}Homecoming
