= 1947 Cal Poly San Dimas Broncos football team =

American college football season

1947 Cal Poly San Dimas Broncos football
- Conference: Independent
- Record: 4–4–1
- Head coach: Bob Ashton (1st season)

1947 Western non-major college football independents records
| | Conf. | | | Overall |
| Team | W | L | T | W | | L | | T |
|---|---|---|---|---|---|---|---|---|
| Pepperdine | | – | | 9 | – | 0 | – | 0 |
| Hawaii | | – | | 8 | – | 5 | – | 0 |
| Cal Poly San Dimas | | – | | 4 | – | 4 | – | 1 |
| La Verne | | – | | 3 | – | 4 | – | 0 |
| Idaho State | | – | | 3 | – | 5 | – | 1 |
| Loyola (CA) | | – | | 3 | – | 7 | – | 0 |

The 1947 Cal Poly San Dimas Broncos football team represented the Cal Poly Voorhis Unit—now known as California State Polytechnic University, Pomona—as an independent during the 1947 college football season. This was the first year of intercollegiate play for the school. Led by Bob Ashton in his first and only season as head coach, Cal Poly San Dimas compiled a record of 4–4–1. The team was outscored by its opponents 180 to 124 for the season.

== Schedule ==
| Date | Opponent | Site | Result |
|---|---|---|---|
| September 19 | at Fullerton | Fullerton, CA | L 0–33 |
| September 27 | at San Bernardino | Orange Show Stadium; San Bernardino, CA | L 0–39 |
| October 4 | at Chico State | Chico High School Stadium; Chico, CA | L 0–19 |
| October 11? | at Whittier freshmen | Whittier, CA | W 19–0 |
| October 17 | Citrus | Covina High School; Covina, CA | W 33–12 |
| October 25 | Terminal Island Navy | Covina High School; Covina, CA | T 25–25 |
| November 1 | at La Verne | Bonita High School?; La Verne, CA | W 20–6 |
| November 7 | Palomar^{†} | Covina High School; Covina, CA | W 27–13 |
| November 14 | Mt. San Antonio | Covina High School; Covina, CA | L 0–33 |
^{†}Homecoming
