= 1947 Cal Poly Mustangs football team =

American college football season

1947 Cal Poly Mustangs football
- Conference: California Collegiate Athletic Association
- Record: 1–9 (0–5 CCAA)
- Head coach: Howie O'Daniels (11th season)
- Home stadium: Mustang Stadium

1947 California Collegiate Athletic Association football standings
| | Conf. | | | | | Overall |
| Team | W | | L | | T | W | | L | | T |
|---|---|---|---|---|---|---|---|---|---|---|
| Pacific (CA) $ | 5 | – | 0 | – | 0 | 10 | – | 1 | – | 0 |
| San Jose State | 3 | – | 2 | – | 0 | 9 | – | 3 | – | 0 |
| Fresno State | 2 | – | 1 | – | 2 | 3 | – | 6 | – | 2 |
| San Diego State | 2 | – | 2 | – | 1 | 7 | – | 3 | – | 1 |
| Santa Barbara | 1 | – | 3 | – | 1 | 4 | – | 3 | – | 1 |
| Cal Poly | 0 | – | 5 | – | 0 | 1 | – | 9 | – | 0 |
$ – Conference champion

The 1947 Cal Poly Mustangs football team represented California Polytechnic State College—now known as California Polytechnic State University, San Luis Obispo—as a member of the California Collegiate Athletic Association (CCAA) during the 1947 college football season. Led by Howie O'Daniels in his 11th and final season as head coach, Cal Poly compiled an overall record of 1–9 with a mark of 0–5 in conference play, placing last out of six teams in the CCAA. The team lost its final eight games and was outscored by its opponents 332 to 97 for the season.

In the final Litkenhous Ratings released in mid-December, Cal Poly was ranked No. 480 out of 500 college football teams.

The Mustangs played their home games at Mustang Stadium in San Luis Obispo, California.

== Schedule ==
| Date | Opponent | Site | Result | Attendance | Source |
|---|---|---|---|---|---|
| September 20 | at Arizona State* | Goodwin Stadium; Tempe, AZ | L 6–33 | | |
| September 27 | Caltech* | Mustang Stadium; San Luis Obispo, CA | W 26–6 | | |
| October 4 | at San Diego State | Aztec Bowl; San Diego, CA | L 13–56 | 11,000 | |
| October 11 | at Fresno State | Ratcliffe Stadium; Fresno, CA | L 6–14 | 6,085 | |
| October 18 | San Francisco State* | Mustang Stadium; San Luis Obispo, CA | L 18–19 | | |
| October 25 | Pacific (CA) | Mustang Stadium; San Luis Obispo, CA | L 7–41 | | |
| November 1 | at Santa Barbara | La Playa Stadium; Santa Barbara, CA | L 14–53 | | |
| November 8 | Pepperdine*^{†} | Mustang Stadium; San Luis Obispo, CA | L 0–47 | | |
| November 15 | at Occidental* | D. W. Patterson Field; Los Angeles, CA | L 7–16 | 4,500 | |
| November 22 | at San Jose State | Spartan Stadium; San Jose, CA | L 0–47 | | |
*Non-conference game; ^{†}Homecoming
