= 1947 Pepperdine Waves football team =

American college football season

1947 Pepperdine Waves football
- Conference: Independent
- Record: 9–0
- Head coach: Warren Gaer (2nd season)
- Home stadium: Sentinel Field

1947 Western non-major college football independents records
	Conf.			Overall
Team	W	L	T	W		L		T
Pepperdine		–		9	–	0	–	0
Hawaii		–		8	–	5	–	0
Cal Poly San Dimas		–		4	–	4	–	1
La Verne		–		3	–	4	–	0
Idaho State		–		3	–	5	–	1
Loyola (CA)		–		3	–	7	–	0

The 1947 Pepperdine Waves football team was an American football team that represented George Pepperdine College (now known as Pepperdine University) as an independent during the 1947 college football season. In the school's second year of college football, both under the leadership of head coach Warren Gaer, Pepperdine compiled a perfect 9–0 record and outscored opponents by a total of 350 to 26. The team did not allow any opponent to score more than seven points and concluded the season with five consecutive shutouts. The Waves extended their winning streak to 16 games after concluding the program's inaugural 1946 season with seven consecutive wins. The Waves were ranked at No. 63 (out of 500 college football teams) in the final Litkenhous Ratings for 1947.

The season included a 27–6 victory over regional power Arizona State and a 13–0 victory over crosstown rival Loyola. The Loyola game was billed as the "Big Little Game", drew a crowd of 8,000, and was televised on KLAC-TV in Los Angeles. The Pepperdine band made its debut in the fourth game of the season.

With 350 points scored, Pepperdine was the highest scoring college football team during the 1947 season, scoring five points more than second-place Michigan. Fullback Darwin Horn, a 210-pound sophomore from Inglewood, California, tied for national scoring honors with 115 points scored. He was also selected as a first-team back on the 1947 Little All-America college football team.

The team played its home games at Sentinel Field on the campus of Inglewood High School in Inglewood, California.

== Schedule ==
Date	Opponent	Site	Result	Attendance	Source
September 27	at Arizona State–Flagstaff	Skidmore Field; Flagstaff, AZ	W 60–7		
October 4	Redlands	Sentinel Field; Inglewood, CA	W 21–6		
October 11	Arizona State	Sentinel Field; Inglewood, CA	W 27–6	10,249	
October 18	Moiliili Bears (HI)	Sentinel Field; Inglewood, CA	W 34–7		
October 25	Whittier	Sentinel Field; Inglewood, CA	W 46–0	7,851	
November 8	at Cal Poly	Mustang Stadium; San Luis Obispo, CA	W 47–0		
November 15	Humboldt State	Sentinel Field; Inglewood, CA	W 56–0	9,000	
November 22	Caltech	Sentinel Field; Inglewood, CA	W 46–0		
December 5	at Loyola (CA)	Gilmore Stadium; Los Angeles, CA	W 13–0	8,000	

== Roster ==
In its second season of college football, the 1947 squad was made up of 31 sophomores and nine newcomers. Thirty-two players were awarded varsity letters at the end of the season:

- Bill Anderson, center
- Tom Bedore, guard
- Terry Bell, back
- John Bilbrey, back
- Chuck Calvert, tackle
- Don Clark, center
- Martin Cook, tackle
- Ted Cooyas, back
- Dale Drager, back
- Jack Drager, back
- Howard Geiger, tackle
- Chuck Gibbon, back
- Curly Hamilton, end
- Bob Hayes, back
- Bill Hicks, end
- Darwin Horn, back
- Bill Johnston, guard
- Keith Kenworthy, tackle
- Ted Kiappos, guard
- Nelson Loomis, guard
- Bob McCluskey, back
- Hal McCormick, back
- Pat Murphy, end
- Bob Nall, guard
- Elmer Noonan, back
- Bob Quine, tackle
- Walt Reeves, tackle
- Raul Regalado, back
- Sammy Stephens, end
- Norm Stillwell, end
- Phil Strom, guard
- Bo Williams, center
