= 1947 Nevada Wolf Pack football team =

American college football season

1947 Nevada Wolf Pack football

Salad Bowl champion

Salad Bowl, W 13–6 vs. North Texas State Teachers
- Conference: Independent
- Record: 9–2
- Head coach: Joe Sheeketski (1st season)
- Home stadium: Mackay Stadium

1947 Western major college football independents records
	Conf.			Overall
Team	W	L	T	W		L		T
Nevada		–		7	–	2	–	0
San Francisco		–		7	–	3	–	0
Santa Clara		–		4	–	4	–	0
Saint Mary's		–		3	–	7	–	0
Portland		–		1	–	7	–	0

The 1947 Nevada Wolf Pack football team was an American football team that represented the University of Nevada as an independent during the 1947 college football season. The team compiled a 9–2 record, outscored opponents by a total of 321 to 154, and defeated North Texas State Teachers, 13–6, in the 1948 Salad Bowl.

In March 1947, the university hired Joe Sheeketski as its head football coach. He had played halfback at Notre Dame in 1931 and 1932 and had been head coach at Holy Cross from 1939 to 1941. Sheeketski served as Nevada's head coach for four seasons from 1947 to 1950.

Alva Tabor played quarterback for the 1947 Nevada team. He was one of the first African-Americans to play quarterback for a major college football team.

Nevada was ranked at No. 55 (out of 500 college football teams) in the final Litkenhous Ratings for 1947.

== Schedule ==
Date	Opponent	Site	Result	Attendance	Source
September 20	Arizona State–Flagstaff	Mackay Stadium; Reno, NV	W 50–0	5,500	
September 28	at San Francisco	Kezar Stadium; San Francisco, CA	L 13–37	30,000	
October 4	at Oregon	Hayward Field; Eugene, OR	W 13–6	> 11,000	
October 11	Portland	Mackay Stadium; Reno, NV	W 51–6	> 6,000	
October 19	at Saint Mary's	Kezar Stadium; San Francisco, CA	W 39–14	35,000	
October 25	Tulsa^{†}	Mackay Stadium; Reno, NV	W 21–13	8,500	
November 2	at Saint Louis	Walsh Stadium; St. Louis, MO	W 27–21	10,136	
November 8	at Detroit	University of Detroit Stadium; Detroit, MI	L 6–38	15,348	
November 15	Montana State	Mackay Stadium; Reno, NV	W 55–0		
November 29	vs. Arizona State	Butcher Field; Las Vegas, NV	W 33–13	330	
January 1, 1948	vs. North Texas State Teachers	Montgomery Stadium; Phoenix, AZ (Salad Bowl)	W 13–6	11,000	
^{†}Homecoming
