= 1947 Idaho State Bengals football team =

American college football season

1947 Idaho State Bengals football
- Conference: Independent
- Record: 3–5–1
- Head coach: John Vesser (5th season)
- Captain: Ted Krein (Note: Krein became a mechanical engineer and worked at Sandia National Laboratories for 37 years; he died in 2016.)
- Home stadium: Spud Bowl

1947 Western non-major college football independents records
	Conf.			Overall
Team	W	L	T	W		L		T
Pepperdine		–		9	–	0	–	0
Hawaii		–		8	–	5	–	0
Cal Poly San Dimas		–		4	–	4	–	1
La Verne		–		3	–	4	–	0
Idaho State		–		3	–	5	–	1
Loyola (CA)		–		3	–	7	–	0

The 1947 Idaho State Bengals football team was an American football team that represented Idaho State College (later renamed Idaho State University) as an independent during the 1947 college football season. In their fifth season under head coach John Vesser, the team compiled a 3–5–1 record yet outscored their opponents, 166 to 137.

In the final Litkenhous Ratings released in mid-December, Idaho State was ranked at No. 437 out of 500 college football teams.

This was the first season that the program was known as "Idaho State", as the school had previously been named the University of Idaho, Southern Branch.

== Schedule ==
Date	Opponent	Site	Result	Attendance	Source
September 26	at Weber	Ogden Stadium; Ogden, UT	L 14–20	6,500	
October 4	Southern Idaho (Note: Southern Idaho College of Education was known as Albion State Normal School before 1947.)	Spud Bowl; Pocatello, ID	T 20–20		
October 11	Hawaiian All-Stars (Note: The Hawaiian All-Stars were not the 1947 Hawaii Rainbows football team. Per contemporary newspaper accounts, they were the Moiliili Bears of the Hawaiian Senior Football League (a league featuring many alumni of Honolulu-area high schools).)	Spud Bowl; Pocatello, ID	L 12–14	4,000	
October 18	at Western State (CO)	Gunnison, CO	W 19–9		
October 25	at Montana State	Gatton Field; Bozeman, MT	L 12–34		
November 1	at College of Idaho	Hayman Field; Caldwell, ID	L 19–27		
November 8	Eastern Washington^{†}	Spud Bowl; Pocatello, ID	L 0–13		
November 15	Northern Idaho (Note: Northern Idaho College of Education is listed in some sources as Lewis–Clark State College, a name adopted in 1955.)	Spud Bowl; Pocatello, ID	W 45–0		
November 27	Colorado Mines	Spud Bowl; Pocatello, ID	W 25–0	2,000	
^{†}Homecoming
