= 1947 Cal Aggies football team =

American college football season

1947 Cal Aggies football

FWC co-champion
- Conference: Far Western Conference
- Record: 4–5 (3–1 FWC)
- Head coach: Vern Hickey (8th season)
- Captain: Lee Bloxham
- Home stadium: A Street field

1947 Far Western Conference football standings
	Conf.					Overall
Team	W		L		T	W		L		T
Southern Oregon +	3	–	1	–	0	7	–	3	–	0
Cal Aggies +	3	–	1	–	0	4	–	5	–	0
Humboldt State	2	–	2	–	0	5	–	4	–	0
Chico State	1	–	3	–	0	4	–	5	–	0
San Francisco State	1	–	3	–	0	2	–	5	–	0
+ – Conference co-champions

The 1947 Cal Aggies football team represented the College of Agriculture at Davis—now known as the University of California, Davis—as a member of the Far Western Conference (FWC) during the 1947 college football season. Led by eighth-year head coach Vern Hickey, the Aggies compiled an overall record of 4–5 with a mark of 3–1 in conference play, sharing the FWC title with Southern Oregon. The team was outscored by its opponents 123 to 116 for the season.

In the final Litkenhous Ratings released in mid-December, the Cal Aggies were ranked at No. 323 out of 500 college football teams.

The Cal Aggies played home games at A Street field on campus in Davis, California.

== Schedule ==
Date	Opponent	Site	Result	Source
September 27	California JV (Note: The University of California JV team was commonly known as the "Cal Ramblers".)*	A Street field; Davis, CA	L 0–20	
October 4	at Occidental*	D.W. Patterson Field; Los Angeles, CA	L 14–26	
October 11	at San Francisco State	Cox Stadium; San Francisco, CA	W 20–0	
October 18	at Whittier*	Hadley Field; Whittier, CA	W 14–0	
October 25	Santa Barbara*	A Street field; Davis, CA	L 14–26	
November 1	at Humboldt State	Redwood Bowl; Arcata, CA	W 12–7	
November 8	at Chico State	Chico High School Stadium; Chico, CA	L 7–12	
November 15	Stanford JV*	A Street field; Davis, CA	L 14–26	
November 21	Southern Oregon	A Street field; Davis, CA	W 21–6	
*Non-conference game
