= 1947 San Jose State Spartans football team =

American college football season

1947 San Jose State Spartans football
- Conference: California Collegiate Athletic Association
- Record: 9–2 (3–2 CCAA)
- Head coach: Wilbur V. Hubbard (2nd season)
- Home stadium: Spartan Stadium

1947 California Collegiate Athletic Association football standings
	Conf.					Overall
Team	W		L		T	W		L		T
Pacific (CA) $	5	–	0	–	0	10	–	1	–	0
San Jose State	3	–	2	–	0	9	–	3	–	0
Fresno State	2	–	1	–	2	3	–	6	–	2
San Diego State	2	–	2	–	1	7	–	3	–	1
Santa Barbara	1	–	3	–	1	4	–	3	–	1
Cal Poly	0	–	5	–	0	1	–	9	–	0
$ – Conference champion

The 1947 San Jose State Spartans football team represented San Jose State College (Note: San Jose State University was known as San Jose State College from 1935 to 1971.) during the 1947 college football season.

San Jose State competed in the California Collegiate Athletic Association. The team was led by head coach Wilbur V. Hubbard, in his second year, and played home games at Spartan Stadium in San Jose, California. They finished the season with a record of nine wins and three losses (9–3, 3–2 CCAA).

San Jose State was ranked at No. 82 (out of 500 college football teams) in the final Litkenhous Ratings for 1947.

== Schedule ==
Date	Opponent	Site	Result	Attendance	Source
September 19	San Francisco*	Spartan Stadium; San Jose, CA	L 6–20	15,500	
September 26	Hawaii All-Stars*	Spartan Stadium; San Jose, CA	W 35–18	8,500	
October 3	Hardin–Simmons*	Spartan Stadium; San Jose, CA	W 19–12	13,500	
October 11	at Puget Sound*	Tacoma, WA	W 18–0		
October 17	Santa Barbara	Spartan Stadium; San Jose, CA	W 39–0		
October 25	at San Diego State	Balboa Stadium; San Diego, CA	W 32–7	25,000	
October 31	Pacific (CA)	Spartan Stadium; San Jose, CA (rivalry)	L 0–14		
November 8	at BYU*	Cougar Stadium (Note: This stadium is the predecessor to the current Cougar Stadium on the BYU campus, which was opened for the 1964 season); Provo, UT	W 28–19	5,000	
November 22	Cal Poly	Spartan Stadium; San Jose, CA	W 47–0		
November 27	Fresno State	Spartan Stadium; San Jose, CA (rivalry)	L 20–21	8,500	
December 9	at Moiliili*	Honolulu Stadium; Honolulu, HI	W 53–0	2,500	
December 17	Wahiawa Leilehua High School alumni*	Honolulu Stadium; Honolulu, HI	W 20–14	3,000	
*Non-conference game

== Team players in the NFL ==
No San Jose State players were selected in the 1948 NFL draft.

The following finished their San Jose State career in 1947, were not drafted, but played in the NFL.

Player	Position	NFL team
Floyd Collier	Tackle	1948 San Francisco 49ers
