= 1947 Hawaii Rainbows football team =

American college football season

1947 Hawaii Rainbows football

Pineapple Bowl, W 33–32 vs. Redlands
- Conference: Independent
- Record: 8–5
- Head coach: Tom Kaulukukui (3rd season)
- Home stadium: Honolulu Stadium

1947 Western non-major college football independents records
	Conf.			Overall
Team	W	L	T	W		L		T
Pepperdine		–		9	–	0	–	0
Hawaii		–		8	–	5	–	0
Cal Poly San Dimas		–		4	–	4	–	1
La Verne		–		3	–	4	–	0
Idaho State		–		3	–	5	–	1
Loyola (CA)		–		3	–	7	–	0

The 1947 Hawaii Rainbows football team was an American football team that represented the University of Hawaii as an independent during the 1947 college football season. In its third season under head coach Tom Kaulukukui, the team compiled an 8–5 record, including a 27–13 victory over Fresno State in the 17th annual Shrine Game, and a 33–32 victory over Redlands in the fourth annual Pineapple Bowl. The team played its home games at Honolulu Stadium in Honolulu.

In an October 4 loss to Utah, the team gained only 57 yards (all by rushing) and converted only two first downs, both of which remain the lowest single-game totals in program history.

Five of Hawaii's victories were over members of the Hawaii Senior Football League – the Moiliili Bears, Olympics, Kaialums, Leilehuas, and Mickalums. The Kaialums, Leilehuas, and Mickalums consisted of alumni of the area's Kaimuki, Leilehua, and President William McKinley High Schools.

In the final Litkenhous Ratings released in mid-December, Hawaii was ranked at No. 186 out of 500 college football teams.

== Schedule ==
Date	Opponent	Site	Result	Attendance	Source
September 17	Moiliili Bears	Honolulu Stadium; Honolulu, Territory of Hawaii	W 18–6	19,000	
September 27	Saint Mary's	Honolulu Stadium; Honolulu, Territory of Hawaii	L 7–27	27,000	
October 4	at Utah	Ute Stadium; Salt Lake City, UT	L 0–35	23,518	
October 11	vs. Montana State	Public Schools stadium; Billings, MT	W 14–0	5,000–10,000	
October 22	Olympics	Honolulu Stadium; Honolulu, Territory of Hawaii	W 40–15	5,000	
October 29	Kaialums	Honolulu Stadium; Honolulu, Territory of Hawaii	W 65–0		
November 5	Leilehuas	Honolulu Stadium; Honolulu, Territory of Hawaii	W 26–0	10,000	
November 12	Mickalums	Honolulu Stadium; Honolulu, Territory of Hawaii	W 33–13		
November 29	Michigan State	Honolulu Stadium; Honolulu, Territory of Hawaii	L 19–58	15,000	
December 6	Fresno State	Honolulu Stadium; Honolulu, Territory of Hawaii (rivalry)	W 27–13	27,500	
December 13	Denver	Honolulu Stadium; Honolulu, Territory of Hawaii	L 0–27	> 5,000	
December 20	Montana	Honolulu Stadium; Honolulu, Territory of Hawaii	L 12–14	< 5,000	
January 1, 1948	Redlands	Honolulu Stadium; Honolulu, Territory of Hawaii (Pineapple Bowl)	W 33–32	12,000	
