= Edward McKeever =

American football player, coach, and executive (1910–1974)

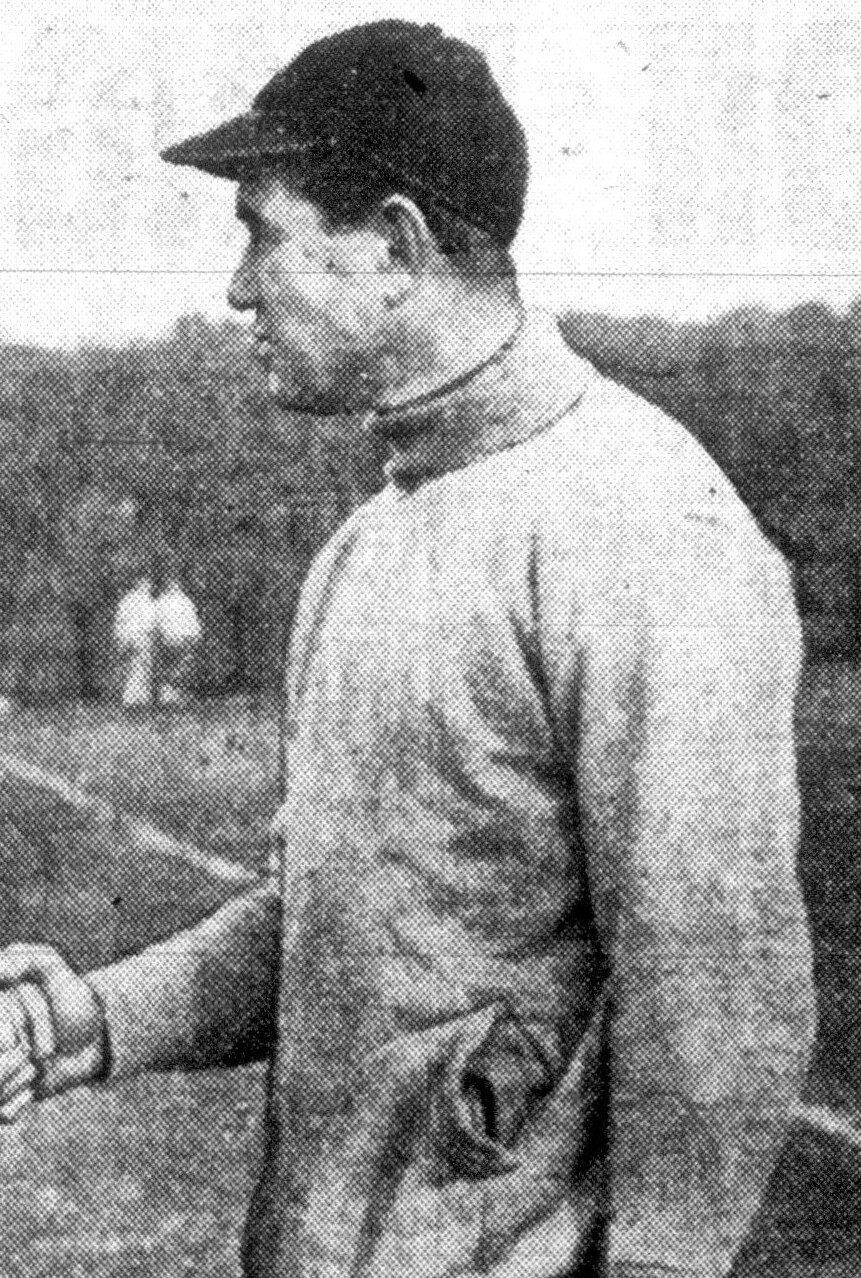
- McKeever, circa 1942

Biographical details
- Born: August 25, 1910; San Antonio, Texas, U.S.
- Died: September 13, 1974 (aged 64); Baton Rouge, Louisiana, U.S.

Playing career
- 1932–1934: Texas Tech

Coaching career (HC unless noted)
- 1935–1938: Texas Tech (backfield)
- 1939–1940: Boston College (assistant)
- 1941–1943: Notre Dame (backfield)
- 1944: Notre Dame
- 1945–1946: Cornell
- 1947: San Francisco
- 1948: Chicago Rockets
- 1949–1951: LSU (backfield)

Administrative career (AD unless noted)
- 1960–1963: Boston Patriots (GM)

Head coaching record
- Overall: 25–12–1 (college); 1–3 (AAFC)

Edward Clark Timothy McKeever (August 25, 1910 – September 13, 1974) was an American football player, coach, and executive. He served as the head football coach at the University of Notre Dame (1944) and Cornell University (1945–1946) and the University of San Francisco (1947), compiling a career college football record of 25–12–1.

A native of Texas, McKeever originally attended Notre Dame in 1930 and 1931 and transferred to Texas Tech University, where he played football from 1932 to 1934. He launched his coaching career in 1935 as backfield coach at Texas Tech, where he remained through 1938. In 1939 and 1940, McKeever was on Frank Leahy's staff at Boston College. He came to Notre Dame along with Leahy in 1941 and served as an assistant through 1943, and was named interim head coach in 1944 when Leahy entered the United States Navy. McKeever gained a spot in the Notre Dame record books by presiding over the worst defeat in school history, a 59–0 rout by Army. In 1945, McKeever moved on to Cornell as head coach, where he remained for two seasons. In 1947, he became head coach at the University of San Francisco and the following season served as head coach of the Chicago Rockets of the All-America Football Conference In 1949, he joined the staff at Louisiana State University. He left coaching in 1951 to become the executive director of the Associated General Contractors of Louisiana. He was also a scout for the New York Giants. In 1960, he became general manager of the Boston Patriots of the American Football League. In 1964, the position of general manager was eliminated and McKeever's duties were assumed by head coach Mike Holovak. McKeever returned to his home in Baton Rouge, Louisiana and scouted southeastern colleges for the Patriots until 1971.

McKeever died on September 13, 1974.

== Head coaching record ==
=== College ===
Year	Team	Overall	Bowl/playoffs	AP^{#}
Notre Dame Fighting Irish (Independent) (1944)
1944	Notre Dame	8–2		9
Notre Dame:		8–2		
Cornell Big Red (Independent) (1945–1946)
1945	Cornell	5–4		
1946	Cornell	5–3–1		
Cornell:		10–7–1		
San Francisco Dons (Independent) (1947)
1947	San Francisco	7–3		
San Francisco:		7–3		
Total:		25–12–1		
^{#}Rankings from final AP Poll.
