= Eugene Gill =

American coach (1898–1981)

Biographical details
- Born: August 8, 1898; Eugene, Oregon, U.S.
- Died: October 11, 1981 (aged 83); Roseburg, Oregon, U.S.

Playing career

Football
- 1921–1923: Oregon Agricultural

Coaching career (HC unless noted)

Football
- 1940–1941: Hawaii

Basketball
- 1930–1941: Hawaii

Baseball
- 1938–1939: Hawaii

Administrative career (AD unless noted)
- 1940–1941: Hawaii

Head coaching record
- Overall: 10–6 (football); 88–47 (basketball)
- Bowls: 0–1

Eugene Luke Gill (August 8, 1898 – October 11, 1981) was an American football, basketball, baseball coach and college athletics administrator. He served as the head football coach at the University of Hawaii from 1940 to 1941. In 1941, Gill and Tom Kaulukukui were co-head coaches. Gill was born on August 8, 1898, in Eugene, Oregon, and raised in the Salem, Oregon area. He attended Oregon Agricultural College–now known as Oregon State University—where he lettered in football and ran track. He was the brother of Slats Gill, who was head basketball coach, head baseball coach, and athletic director at Oregon State. Gill died on October 11, 1981, at Veterans Administration Medical Center in Roseburg, Oregon.

== Head coaching record ==
=== Football ===
Year	Team	Overall	Conference	Standing	Bowl/playoffs
Hawaii Rainbows (Independent) (1940–1941)
1940	Hawaii	2–5			L Pineapple
1941	Hawaii	8–1			
Hawaii:		10–6			
Total:		10–6			
