= Hal Moe =

American football player and coach (1910–2001)

Biographical details
- Born: March 28, 1910; Spokane, Washington, U.S.
- Died: May 26, 2001 (aged 91); Corvallis, Oregon, U.S.

Playing career

Football
- 1929–1932: Oregon State
- 1933: Chicago Cardinals
- Position: Halfback

Coaching career (HC unless noted)

Football
- 1933–1942: Oregon State (assistant)
- 1946–1948: Portland
- 1949–1952: Oregon State (assistant)

Track
- 1952–1958: Oregon State

Administrative career (AD unless noted)
- 1946–1948: Portland

Head coaching record
- Overall: 4–17–2 (football)

Accomplishments and honors

Awards
- Second-team All-PCC (1932)

Harold William Moe (March 28, 1910 – May 26, 2001) was an American football player and coach. He played and coached at Oregon State University, then known as Oregon Agricultural College. He played one season in the National Football League (NFL) with the Chicago Cardinals.

== Early life and playing career ==
Born in Spokane, Washington, Moe went on to attend Oregon Agricultural College, where he played halfback on the school's football team from 1929 to 1932. Upon the conclusion of his career at Oregon State, he played one season in the National Football League (NFL) for the Chicago Cardinals.

== Collegiate coaching ==
After one season in the NFL, Moe returned to Corvallis, Oregon to become an assistant football coach at Oregon State. He remained with the team in that role from 1933 until the Beavers' appearance in the 1942 Rose Bowl, after which he joined the military and served in the Pacific Theater of World War II.

Following the war, Moe returned to Portland in 1946 and became the head football coach and athletic director at the University of Portland, where he remained until 1948, a year before the school ended its football program. He returned to Oregon State as an assistant football coach from 1949 to 1952, and then became the school's head track and field coach from 1952 to 1958.

== Legacy ==
Moe was named to the Oregon Sports Hall of Fame in 1982 and the Oregon State University Hall of Fame in 1990. He died in Corvallis in 2001.

== Head coaching record ==
=== Football ===
Year	Team	Overall	Conference	Standing	Bowl/playoffs
Portland Pilots (Independent) (1946–1948)
1946	Portland	1–4–1			
1947	Portland	1–8			
1948	Portland	2–5–1			
Portland:		4–17–2			
Total:		4–17–2			
