= 1947 Fresno State Bulldogs football team =

American college football season

1947 Fresno State Bulldogs football
- Conference: California Collegiate Athletic Association
- Record: 3–6–2 (2–1–2 CCAA)
- Head coach: Ken Gleason (1st season)
- Home stadium: Ratcliffe Stadium

1947 California Collegiate Athletic Association football standings
	Conf.					Overall
Team	W		L		T	W		L		T
Pacific (CA) $	5	–	0	–	0	10	–	1	–	0
San Jose State	3	–	2	–	0	9	–	3	–	0
Fresno State	2	–	1	–	2	3	–	6	–	2
San Diego State	2	–	2	–	1	7	–	3	–	1
Santa Barbara	1	–	3	–	1	4	–	3	–	1
Cal Poly	0	–	5	–	0	1	–	9	–	0
$ – Conference champion

The 1947 Fresno State Bulldogs football team represented Fresno State Normal School—now known as California State University, Fresno—during the 1947 college football season. Fresno State competed in the California Collegiate Athletic Association (CCAA). The team was led by first-year head coach Ken Gleason and played home games at Ratcliffe Stadium on the campus of Fresno City College in Fresno, California. They finished the season with a record of three wins, six losses and two ties (3–6–2, 2–1–2 CCAA). The Bulldogs were outscored 133–236 for the season.

In the final Litkenhous Ratings released in mid-December, Fresno State was ranked at No. 194 out of 500 college football teams.

== Schedule ==
Date	Opponent	Site	Result	Attendance	Source
September 20	Oklahoma City*	Ratcliffe Stadium; Fresno, CA	L 2–27	13,758	
September 27	Moiliili Bears (HI)*	Ratcliffe Stadium; Fresno, CA	W 18–7	7,704	
October 4	Santa Clara*	Ratcliffe Stadium; Fresno, CA	L 19–20	10,780	
October 11	Cal Poly	Ratcliffe Stadium; Fresno, CA	W 14–6	6,085	
October 18	Honolulu All-Stars (HI)*	Ratcliffe Stadium; Fresno, CA	L 7–34	7,862	
November 1	San Diego State	Ratcliffe Stadium; Fresno, CA (rivalry)	T 7–7	4,307	
November 8	at New Mexico*	Zimmerman Field; Albuquerque, NM	L 3–34	7,500	
November 15	at Santa Barbara	La Playa Stadium; Santa Barbara, CA	T 7–7	5,000	
November 21	at Pacific (CA)*	Baxter Stadium; Stockton, CA	L 22–47		
November 27	at San Jose State	Spartan Stadium; San Jose, CA (rivalry)	W 21–20	8,500	
December 6	at Hawaii*	Honolulu Stadium; Honolulu, Territory of Hawaii (rivalry)	L 13–27	26,000	
*Non-conference game

== Team players in the NFL ==
No Fresno State Bulldog players were selected in the 1948 NFL draft.

The following Fresno State Bulldog players finished their college career in 1947, were not drafted, but played in the NFL.

Player	Position	First NFL team
Floyd Collier	Tackle	1948 San Francisco 49ers
