= Derek Tatsuno =

American baseball player (born 1958)

- Pitcher
- Born: 1958 (age 67–68)
- Bats: Unknown Throws: Left
- Stats at Baseball Reference

Member of the National College

Baseball Hall of Fame
- Induction: 2007

Derek Shizuo Tatsuno (born 1958) is an American former baseball pitcher who played for the University of Hawaii and in Minor League Baseball.

== College career ==
Tatsuno played baseball at ʻAiea High School where he had a 27–1 record as a pitcher and, as a freshman, he threw a no-hitter against Leilehua High School. In 1976, he led the school to a state title over President William McKinley High School. In spite of that, he was not heavily recruited to play college baseball and chose to attend the University of Hawaii at Manoa from 1977 to 1979 to pitch for the Hawaii Rainbow Warriors. While a junior in 1979, he set an NCAA record by winning 20 games and striking out 234 batters. An NCAA-record 18,345 spectators attended his final home game on May 19, 1979 at Aloha Stadium to watch him strike out 12 UNLV batters.

== Professional career ==
Tatsuno was selected in the 2nd round of the regular phase of the June 1979 draft by the San Diego Padres. However, he signed a reported one million dollar contract to play in Japan. He was selected in the 2nd round of the January 1980 secondary phase by the Chicago White Sox, and in the 1st round of the January 1982 regular phase by the Milwaukee Brewers.

Tatsuno never played in the majors. In 1982 he played for the Brewers' AA affiliate, the El Paso Diablos of the Texas League, going 7–2 with a 6.42 ERA and walking more than a batter an inning. In 1983 he was demoted to the Single-A Stockton Ports of the California League, going 10–6, 3.24, but Milwaukee released him. After not pitching the two previous years, Tatsuno resurfaced briefly with the Hawaii Islanders of the Pacific Coast League, the 1986 Triple-A affiliate of the Pittsburgh Pirates and 1987 Triple-A affiliate of the Chicago White Sox. In 1986 he posted a 5.52 era in 29.1 innings over 11 games. In 1987 his marks raised to a 6.60 era in 43.2 innings over 22 games.

== Awards and honors ==
- Tatsuno was selected to the All-Time All-Star Team of Collegiate Baseball America.
- UH Manoa Baseball retired his number, 16, in 1997.
- On July 4, 2007, Tatsuno was inducted into the College Baseball Hall of Fame.
