= 1947 Montana State Bobcats football team =

American college football season

1947 Montana State Bobcats football
- Conference: Rocky Mountain Conference
- Record: 4–5 (1–0 RMC)
- Head coach: Clyde Carpenter (2nd season)
- Home stadium: Gatton Field

1947 Rocky Mountain Conference football standings
| | Conf. | | | | | Overall |
| Team | W | | L | | T | W | | L | | T |
|---|---|---|---|---|---|---|---|---|---|---|
| Montana State $ | 1 | – | 0 | – | 0 | 4 | – | 5 | – | 0 |
| Colorado College | 2 | – | 1 | – | 0 | 4 | – | 5 | – | 0 |
| Colorado State–Greeley | 2 | – | 1 | – | 1 | 4 | – | 4 | – | 1 |
| Colorado Mines | 1 | – | 2 | – | 0 | 1 | – | 7 | – | 0 |
| Western State (CO) | 0 | – | 2 | – | 1 | 1 | – | 6 | – | 1 |
$ – Conference champion

The 1947 Montana State Bobcats football team was an American football team that represented Montana State University in the Rocky Mountain Conference (RMC) during the 1947 college football season. In its second season under head coach Clyde Carpenter, the team compiled a 4–5 record.

The Bobcats defeated cross-state rival Montana on October 18 to win the Copper Bowl trophy. The game drew a crowd of 13,350, the largest crowd to see any sporting event in the state of Montana up to that point.

In the final Litkenhous Ratings released in mid-December, Montana State was ranked at No. 165 out of 500 college football teams.

== Schedule ==
| Date | Opponent | Site | Result | Attendance | Source |
|---|---|---|---|---|---|
| September 20 | at Oregon* | Hayward Field; Eugene, OR | L 14–27 | 11,500 | |
| September 26 | at BYU* | Provo, UT | L 14–19 | | |
| October 3 | at Colorado State–Greeley | Greeley, CO | W 32–13 | | |
| October 11 | vs. Hawaii* | Public Schools stadium; Billings, MT | L 0–14 | 5,000 | |
| October 18 | vs. Montana* | Naranche Stadium; Butte, MT (Copper Bowl) | W 13–12 | 10,350 | |
| October 25 | Idaho State* | Gatton Field; Bozeman, MT | W 34–12 | | |
| November 1 | Utah State*^{†} | Gatton Field; Bozeman, MT | L 13–28 | 7,000 | |
| November 8 | vs. Portland* | Mitchell Stadium; Anaconda, MT | W 20–13 | 3,000 | |
| November 15 | at Nevada* | Mackay Stadium; Reno, NV | L 0–55 | | |
*Non-conference game; ^{†}Homecoming
