= 1947 Saint Mary's Gaels football team =

American college football season

1947 Saint Mary's Gaels football
- Conference: Independent
- Record: 3–7
- Head coach: James Phelan (6th season)
- Home stadium: Kezar Stadium

1947 Western major college football independents records
	Conf.			Overall
Team	W	L	T	W		L		T
Nevada		–		7	–	2	–	0
San Francisco		–		7	–	3	–	0
Santa Clara		–		4	–	4	–	0
Saint Mary's		–		3	–	7	–	0
Portland		–		1	–	7	–	0

The 1947 Saint Mary's Gaels football team was an American football team that represented Saint Mary's College of California during the 1947 college football season. In their sixth and final season under head coach James Phelan, the Gaels compiled a 3–7 record and were outscored by opponents by a combined total of 246 to 178.

Left halfback Herman Wedemeyer starred for the 1947 Saint Mary's team.

Saint Mary's was ranked at No. 101 (out of 500 college football teams) in the final Litkenhous Ratings for 1947.

== Schedule ==
Date	Opponent	Site	Result	Attendance	Source
September 21	Portland	Oaks Park; Oakland, CA	W 26–13	15,300	
September 27	at Hawaii	Honolulu Stadium; Honolulu, Territory of Hawaii	W 27–7	27,000	
October 4	at California	California Memorial Stadium; Los Angeles, CA	L 6–45	78,000	
October 11	at Washington	Husky Stadium; Seattle, WA	L 6–26	39,000	
October 19	Nevada	Kezar Stadium; San Francisco, CA	L 14–39	35,000	
October 24	at Loyola (CA)	Los Angeles Memorial Coliseum; Los Angeles, CA	W 57–7	12,000	
November 1	at Detroit	Briggs Stadium; Detroit, MI	L 6–19	20,253	
November 16	vs. Santa Clara	Kezar Stadium; San Francisco, CA	L 9–33	40,000	
November 22	at Boston College	Braves Field; Boston, MA	L 7–25	19,733	
November 30	vs. San Francisco	Kezar Stadium; San Francisco, CA	L 20–32	35,000	
