= 1947 San Francisco Dons football team =

American college football season

1947 San Francisco Dons football
- Conference: Independent
- Record: 7–3
- Head coach: Edward McKeever (1st season)
- Home stadium: Kezar Stadium

1947 Western major college football independents records
	Conf.			Overall
Team	W	L	T	W		L		T
Nevada		–		7	–	2	–	0
San Francisco		–		7	–	3	–	0
Santa Clara		–		4	–	4	–	0
Saint Mary's		–		3	–	7	–	0
Portland		–		1	–	7	–	0

The 1947 San Francisco Dons football team was an American football team that represented the University of San Francisco as an independent during the 1947 college football season. In its first and only season under head coach Edward McKeever, the team compiled a 7–3 record and outscored opponents by a total of 275 to 143.

San Francisco was ranked at No. 37 (out of 500 college football teams) in the final Litkenhous Ratings for 1947.

== Schedule ==
Date	Opponent	Rank	Site	Result	Attendance	Source
September 19	at San Jose State		Spartan Stadium; San Jose, CA	W 20–6	15,500	
September 28	Nevada		Kezar Stadium; San Francisco, CA	W 37–13	30,000	
October 5	Duquesne		Kezar Stadium; San Francisco, CA	W 51–0	12,000	
October 11	Mississippi State		Kezar Stadium; San Francisco, CA	L 14–21	22,000	
October 18	at Marquette		Marquette Stadium; Milwaukee, WI	W 34–13	13,000	
October 25	at Oregon	No. 20	Hayward Field; Eugene, OR	L 7–34	11,400	
November 2	Santa Clara		Kezar Stadium; San Francisco, CA	W 20–9	25,000	
November 14	Loyola (CA)		Kezar Stadium; San Francisco, CA	W 41–6	6,396	
November 22	Villanova		Kezar Stadium; San Francisco, CA	L 19–21	20,000	
November 30	Saint Mary's		Kezar Stadium; San Francisco, CA	W 32–20	35,000	
Rankings from AP Poll released prior to the game

== Rankings ==
Ranking movements Legend: ██ Increase in ranking ██ Decrease in ranking — = Not ranked
	Week									
Poll	1	2	3	4	5	6	7	8	9	Final
AP	—	—	20	—	—	—	—	—	—	—
