= 1947 Loyola Lions football team =

American college football season

1947 Loyola Lions football
- Conference: Independent
- Record: 3–7
- Head coach: Bill Sargent (1st season)
- Home stadium: Gilmore Stadium; Los Angeles Memorial Coliseum

1947 Western non-major college football independents records
| | Conf. | | | Overall |
| Team | W | L | T | W | | L | | T |
|---|---|---|---|---|---|---|---|---|
| Pepperdine | | – | | 9 | – | 0 | – | 0 |
| Hawaii | | – | | 8 | – | 5 | – | 0 |
| Cal Poly San Dimas | | – | | 4 | – | 4 | – | 1 |
| La Verne | | – | | 3 | – | 4 | – | 0 |
| Idaho State | | – | | 3 | – | 5 | – | 1 |
| Loyola (CA) | | – | | 3 | – | 7 | – | 0 |

The 1947 Loyola Lions football team was an American football team that represented Loyola University of Los Angeles (now known as Loyola Marymount University) as an independent during the 1947 college football season. In their first season under head coach Bill Sargent, the Lions compiled a 3–7 record and were outscored, 224 to 186.

In the final Litkenhous Ratings released in mid-December, Loyola was ranked at No. 196 out of 500 college football teams.

The season included three games against teams from Hawaii's Senior League, including two games played in Honolulu, and the first game of a home-and-away series against Mexico's national military academy, Heroico Colegio Militar.

Sargent, a Loyola alumnus, was named as Loyola's head football coach and athletic director in February 1947. Sargent was 39 years old at the time of his hiring and had previously been the head coach at Loyola High School in Los Angeles. He replaced Tony DeLellis who resigned one week earlier.

== Schedule ==
| Date | Opponent | Site | Result | Attendance | Source |
|---|---|---|---|---|---|
| September 28 | Heroico Colegio Militar | Gilmore Stadium; Los Angeles, CA | W 67–2 | 8,500–10,000 | |
| October 3 | Pacific (CA) | Gilmore Stadium; Los Angeles, CA | L 7–25 | 12,000 | |
| October 10 | Leilehua (Honolulu All-Stars) | Gilmore Stadium; Los Angeles, CA | L 29–31 | 4,000 | |
| October 17 | Redlands | Gilmore Stadium; Los Angeles, CA | W 19–16 | 5,500 | |
| October 24 | Saint Mary's | Los Angeles Memorial Coliseum; Los Angeles, CA | L 7–57 | 12,000 | |
| November 8 | at San Diego State | Aztec Bowl; San Diego, CA | L 12–13 | 7,000 | |
| November 14 | San Francisco | Los Angeles Memorial Coliseum; Los Angeles, CA | L 6–41 | 6,396 | |
| November 20 | at Olympic Club (Hawaii Senior League) | Honolulu Stadium; Honolulu, HI | W 32–0 | 2,000 | |
| November 26 | at Leilehua (Honolulu All-Stars) | Honolulu Stadium; Honolulu, HI | L 7–26 | 15,000 | |
| December 5 | Pepperdine | Gilmore Stadium; Los Angeles, CA | L 0–13 | 8,000 | |
