= 1947 Portland Pilots football team =

American college football season

1947 Portland Pilots football
- Conference: Independent
- Record: 1–8
- Head coach: Hal Moe (2nd season)
- Home stadium: Multnomah Stadium

1947 Western major college football independents records
| | Conf. | | | Overall |
| Team | W | L | T | W | | L | | T |
|---|---|---|---|---|---|---|---|---|
| Nevada | | – | | 7 | – | 2 | – | 0 |
| San Francisco | | – | | 7 | – | 3 | – | 0 |
| Santa Clara | | – | | 4 | – | 4 | – | 0 |
| Saint Mary's | | – | | 3 | – | 7 | – | 0 |
| Portland | | – | | 1 | – | 7 | – | 0 |

The 1947 Portland Pilots football team was an American football team that represented the University of Portland as an independent during the 1947 college football season. In its second year under head coach Hal Moe, the team compiled a 1–8 record. The team played its home games at Multnomah Stadium in Portland, Oregon.

Players included Jim Sweeney, who played as an end for Portland's freshman team in 1947.

In the final Litkenhous Ratings released in mid-December, Portland was ranked at No. 227 out of 500 college football teams.

== Schedule ==
| Date | Opponent | Site | Result | Attendance | Source |
|---|---|---|---|---|---|
| September 21 | at Saint Mary's | Oaks Park; Oakland, CA | L 13–26 | 15,300 | |
| September 27 | at Montana | Dornblaser Field; Missoula, MT | L 0–21 | | |
| October 5 | Hawaiian All-Stars (Leialums) | Multnomah Stadium; Portland, OR | L 6–14 | 7,500 | |
| October 11 | at Nevada | Mackay Stadium; Reno, NV | L 6–51 | > 6,000 | |
| October 18 | at Idaho | Neale Stadium; Moscow, ID | L 7–22 | 7,500 | |
| October 25 | at Oregon State | Bell Field; Corvallis, OR | L 0–40 | | |
| October 31 | Washington State | Multnomah Stadium; Portland, OR | L 0–35 | | |
| November 8 | vs. Montana State* | Mitchell Stadium; Anaconda, MT | L 13–20 | 3,000 | |
| November 15 | Willamette^{†} | Multnomah Stadium; Portland, OR | W 27–0 | | |
*Non-conference game; ^{†}Homecoming
