= Mike Campbell (pitcher) =

American baseball player (1964–2025)

- Pitcher
- Born: February 17, 1964; Seattle, Washington, U.S.
- Died: December 15, 2025 (aged 61)
- Batted: Right Threw: Right

MLB debut
- July 4, 1987, for the Seattle Mariners

Last MLB appearance
- September 27, 1996, for the Chicago Cubs

MLB statistics
- Win–loss record: 12–19
- Earned run average: 5.86
- Strikeouts: 135
- Stats at Baseball Reference

Teams
- Seattle Mariners (1987–1989); Texas Rangers (1992); San Diego Padres (1994); Chicago Cubs (1996)

Michael Thomas Campbell (February 17, 1964 – December 15, 2025) was an American professional baseball pitcher. He played in Major League Baseball (MLB) for the Seattle Mariners, Texas Rangers, San Diego Padres, and Chicago Cubs from 1987 to 1996.

== Biography ==
Campell attended West Seattle High School then Newport High School in Washington before playing college baseball for the Hawaii Rainbow Warriors. He was Hawaii's most valuable pitcher in 1984 and 1985. He was picked in the first round (seventh overall) by the Seattle Mariners in the 1985 Major League Baseball draft. Campbell was named Pacific Coast League Most Valuable Player in 1987 while coming up through the Mariners system with the Calgary Cannons before his MLB debut that same year.

After making his major league debut on July 4, 1987, Campbell was in and out of the Mariners rotation from 1987 to 1989. In one of his best games, he threw a one-run, five-hit complete game shutout against the Cleveland Indians on April 28, 1988, with a career-high 7 strikeouts. In July 1989, he was traded to the Montreal Expos as the player to be named later in an earlier trade that sent Mark Langston to Montreal for Randy Johnson, Brian Holman and Gene Harris. Campbell also played in the big leagues with the Texas Rangers, San Diego Padres, and Chicago Cubs.

Chronic shoulder injuries limited Campbell. He fractured an ankle bone with the Cubs in 1996, ending his season early. He signed with the Yokohama BayStars in 1997, but his ankle injury never healed. He was cut in spring training by the Expos in 1988, then pitched that summer for the Grays Harbor Gulls of the Western Baseball League (WBL). He retired from baseball in 1999 after stints in independent baseball with the Lehigh Valley Black Diamonds of the Atlantic League and Tri-City Posse of the WBL.

After retiring as a player, Campbell and Steve Towey, a former minor league pitcher and Mariners bat boy, ran Shiskaberry's, a concession stand at ballparks and street events.

Campbell died from a heart attack on December 15, 2025, at the age of 61.
