= Quintin Torres-Costa =

American baseball player (born 1994)

- Pitcher
- Born: September 11, 1994 (age 30); Hilo, Hawaii, U.S.
- Bats: Left Throws: Left

Quintin John Alohiokala Torres-Costa (born September 11, 1994) is an American former professional baseball pitcher.

== Career ==
=== Milwaukee Brewers ===
Torres-Costa attended Waiakea High School in Hilo, Hawaii and played college baseball at the University of Hawaii at Manoa. He was drafted by the Milwaukee Brewers in the 35th round of the 2015 Major League Baseball draft. He signed and spent his first professional season with the Arizona League Brewers and Helena Brewers, compiling a 2-0 record and a 3.38 ERA in 14 relief appearances.

Torres-Costa spent 2016 with Helena and Wisconsin Timber Rattlers, going a combined 6-3 with a 3.92 ERA in 45 relief appearances, and 2017 with the Carolina Mudcats and Biloxi Shuckers, pitching to a 9-6 record and a 4.23 ERA in 41 appearances in relief. After the 2017 season, he played in the Arizona Fall League. He started 2018 with Biloxi and was promoted to the Colorado Springs Sky Sox during the season. In 43 relief appearances between the two clubs, Torres-Costa was 3-2 with a 1.31 ERA.

Torres-Costa underwent Tommy John Surgery during the offseason, forcing him to miss all of 2019. He did not play a minor league game in 2020 due to the cancellation of the minor league season caused by the COVID-19 pandemic. In 2021, he made 35 relief appearances with the Triple-A Nashville Sounds and accumulated a 6.81 ERA before being released on August 30.

=== Gastonia Honey Hunters ===
On March 16, 2022, Torres-Costa signed with the Gastonia Honey Hunters of the Atlantic League of Professional Baseball. He announced his retirement on August 29, 2022.
