= Chuck Jackson (baseball) =

American baseball player (born 1963)

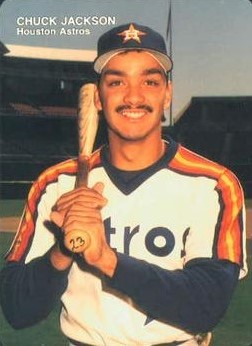
- Third baseman
- Born: March 19, 1963; Seattle, Washington, U.S.
- Batted: Right Threw: Right

MLB debut
- May 26, 1987, for the Houston Astros

Last MLB appearance
- June 14, 1994, for the Texas Rangers

MLB statistics
- Batting average: .218
- Home runs: 2
- Runs batted in: 14
- Stats at Baseball Reference

Teams
- Houston Astros (1987–1988); Texas Rangers (1994)

Charles Leo Jackson (born March 19, 1963) is an American former professional baseball player who played mostly third base in the Major League Baseball (MLB) for the Houston Astros in 1987 and 1988 and the Texas Rangers in 1994.

== Career ==
Jackson attended the University of Hawaii at Manoa and was drafted by the Astros in the seventh round of the 1984 Major League Baseball draft. He played at the AAA level each year from 1985 through 1994, and retired after playing for the St. Paul Saints of the Northern League in 1996.
