= Joey Meyer (baseball) =

American baseball player (born 1962)

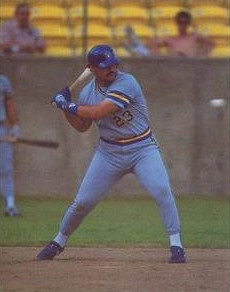
- Designated hitter / First baseman
- Born: May 10, 1962 (age 62); Honolulu, Hawaii, U.S.
- Batted: Right Threw: Right

MLB debut
- April 4, 1988, for the Milwaukee Brewers

Last MLB appearance
- September 30, 1989, for the Milwaukee Brewers

MLB statistics
- Batting average: .251
- Home runs: 18
- Runs batted in: 74

NPB statistics
- Batting average: .275
- Home runs: 26
- Runs batted in: 77
- Stats at Baseball Reference

Teams
- Milwaukee Brewers (1988–1989); Yokohama Taiyo Whales (1990)

Tanner Joe Meyer (born May 10, 1962) is an American former Major League Baseball player. He played two seasons in the majors, 1988 and 1989, for the Milwaukee Brewers. He also played one season in Japan for the Yokohama Taiyo Whales in 1990.

== Career ==
Drafted by the Brewers in the fifth round of the 1983 Major League Baseball draft, Meyer showed prodigious power in the minor leagues. In his first season of minor league ball for the Beloit Brewers in 1984, he hit 30 home runs in 475 at bats, earning Midwest League MVP honors. He moved his way up the minor league ladder, continuing to hit for power, culminating in his hitting 29 home runs in just 79 games for the Denver Zephyrs in 1987. Meyer holds the record for the longest home run in professional baseball history at 582 feet (177 m), which he hit June 3, 1987, at Denver's Mile High Stadium. There have been longer home runs reportedly hit but not measured by accurate methods.

Meyer made his major league debut with the Brewers on April 4, 1988. His power numbers did not translate into major league home runs, as he hit just 11 in 103 games for Milwaukee. He did, however, strike out 88 times, compiling more strikeouts than hits. He did have one significant accomplishment on August 9, when he became the first and only player to hit a walk-off home run off Roger Clemens.

He again struggled in the majors in 1989, striking out 36 times in 147 at bats while hitting 7 home runs. Meyer wound up splitting that season between the Brewers and Denver. His final major league game was on September 30, 1989, and he was released after the season. He played in 1990 for the Yokohama Taiyo Whales, where his power numbers were once again impressive, as he hit 26 home runs in 104 games. He returned to the United States, and was signed to a minor league contract by the Minnesota Twins. During spring training, he was traded to the Pittsburgh Pirates, and spent the entire season with their Triple-A affiliate, the Buffalo Bisons. That was his last year in professional baseball.

As of 2021, Meyer works in the security department of a hospital in Maui. He told MLB.com "I don't tell anybody" about his time in professional baseball.
