= Pineapple Bowl =

Defunct college football bowl game held in Honolulu

Pineapple Bowl (defunct)
- Stadium: Honolulu Stadium
- Location: Honolulu, Hawaii
- Operated: 1939–1941; 1947–1952
- Preceded by: Poi Bowl

The Pineapple Bowl was a college football bowl game played during the late 1930's, 1940s and early 1950s in Honolulu, Hawaii, at Honolulu Stadium. The game featured the then-Hawaii Rainbows and an invited team from the mainland.

== History ==
The Pineapple Bowl was a renamed continuation of the Poi Bowl, which had first been played in January 1936. After the attack on Pearl Harbor, the bowl game was suspended for five years. The final edition of the game was played in January 1952. It was held on New Year's Day except in 1950, when the holiday fell on a Sunday.

Following the demise of the Pineapple Bowl, the all-star Hula Bowl was first played in January 1960. The University of Hawaii attempted to revive the Pineapple Bowl in 1980, but the NCAA Special Events Committee turned down their request. The Aloha Bowl was later approved and first played in December 1982.

== Game results ==
The University of Hawaii went 3–6 in the Pineapple Bowl. The only other team to appear more than once in the bowl was Oregon State, who went 2–0.

Date	Winner		Loser	
January 2, 1939	UCLA	32	Hawaii	7
January 1, 1940	Oregon State	39	Hawaii	6
January 1, 1941	Fresno State	3	Hawaii	0
January 1, 1947	Hawaii	19	Utah	16
January 1, 1948	Hawaii	33	Redlands	32
January 1, 1949	Oregon State	47	Hawaii	27
January 2, 1950	Stanford	74	Hawaii	20
January 1, 1951	Hawaii	28	Denver	27
January 1, 1952	San Diego State	34	Hawaii	13

While NCAA records indicate the first playing of the Pineapple Bowl was in January 1940, contemporary newspaper reports indicate the January 1939 edition (which the NCAA lists as a Poi Bowl) was also played using that name.

The media guide of the now-Hawaii Rainbow Warriors football program does not include any Pineapple Bowl games in their bowl game history. Results do appear in the NCAA's bowl game history, in the "Unsanctioned Or Other Bowls" section.

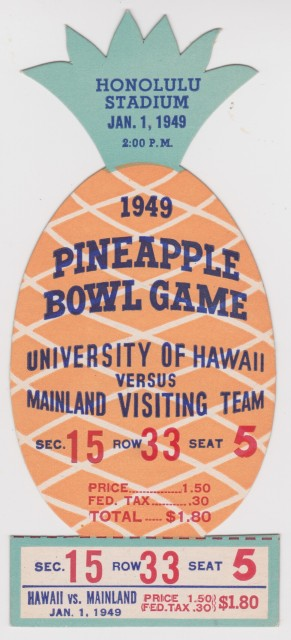

== See also ==
- Poi Bowl (1936–1939)
- Aloha Bowl (1982–2000)
- Oahu Bowl (1998–2000)
- Seattle Bowl (2001–2002)
- Hawaii Bowl (2002–present)
- List of college bowl games
