= 1943 in Michigan =

- Decades: 1920s; 1930s; 1940s; 1950s; 1960s
- See also: History of Michigan; Historical outline of Michigan; List of years in Michigan; 1943 in the United States

Events from the year 1943 in Michigan.

== Top stories ==
The Associated Press polled editors of its member newspapers in Michigan and ranked the state's top news stories of 1943 as follows:

1. 1943 Detroit race riot (278 points)
2. Judge Leland Carr's one-man grand jury investigation of the Michigan Legislature (185 points)
3. The May 26 death of Edsel Ford at age 49 (168-1/2 points)
4. Court-martial of William T. Colman, following the shooting of an African-American private by the commandant of Selfridge field (143-1/2 points)
5. President Roosevelt's July commutation of the death sentence for treason given to German-born Detroit tavernkeeper Max Stephan (130 points)
6. Tom Harmon's survival of plane crashes in South American and China (118 points)
7. The FBI arrests of seven in connection with a Detroit spy ring (100 points)
8. Republican policy conference on Mackinac Island (60 points)
9. Automotive arms output totaled $10 billion (49 points)
10. Re-election of Edward Jeffries as mayor of Detroit (48 points)

== Office holders ==
=== State office holders ===
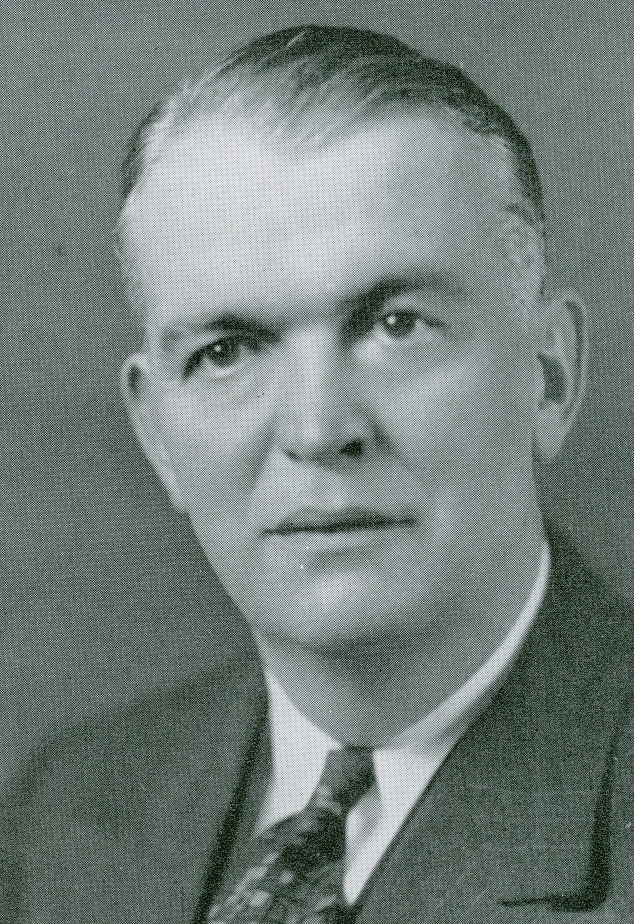
Gov. Harry Kelly

- Governor of Michigan: Harry Kelly (Republican)
- Lieutenant Governor of Michigan: Eugene C. Keyes (Republican)
- Michigan Attorney General: Herbert J. Rushton (Republican)
- Michigan Secretary of State: Herman H. Dignan (Republican)
- Speaker of the Michigan House of Representatives: Howard Nugent (Republican)
- Chief Justice, Michigan Supreme Court: Emerson R. Boyles

=== Mayors of major cities ===
- Mayor of Detroit: Edward Jeffries (Republican)
- Mayor of Grand Rapids: George W. Welsh (Republican)
- Mayor of Flint: William Osmund Kelly
- Mayor of Lansing: Ralph Crego
- Mayor of Dearborn: Orville L. Hubbard
- Mayor of Saginaw: William J. Brydges/Eric F. Wieneke
- Mayor of Ann Arbor: Leigh J. Young

=== Federal office holders ===
- U.S. Senator from Michigan: Homer S. Ferguson (Republican)
- U.S. Senator from Michigan: Arthur Vandenberg (Republican)
- House District 1: Rudolph G. Tenerowicz (Democrat)/George G. Sadowski (Democrat)
- House District 2: Earl C. Michener (Republican)
- House District 3: Paul W. Shafer (Republican)
- House District 4: Clare Hoffman (Republican)
- House District 5: Bartel J. Jonkman (Republican)
- House District 6: William W. Blackney (Republican)
- House District 7: Jesse P. Wolcott (Republican)
- House District 8: Fred L. Crawford (Republican)
- House District 9: Albert J. Engel (Republican)
- House District 10: Roy O. Woodruff (Republican)
- House District 11: Frederick Van Ness Bradley (Republican)
- House District 12: John B. Bennett (Republican)
- House District 13: George D. O'Brien (Democrat)
- House District 14: Louis C. Rabaut (Democrat)
- House District 15: John D. Dingell Sr. (Democrat)
- House District 16: John Lesinski Sr. (Democrat)
- House District 17: George Anthony Dondero (Republican)

== Population ==
In the 1940 United States census, Michigan was recorded as having a population of 5,256,106, ranking as the seventh most populous state in the country. By 1950, Michigan's population had increased by 21.2% to 6,371,766.

=== Cities ===
The following is a list of cities in Michigan with a population of at least 20,000 based on 1940 U.S. Census data. Historic census data from 1930 and 1950 is included to reflect trends in population increases or decreases. Cities that are part of the Detroit metropolitan area are shaded in tan.

1940 Rank	City	County	1940 Pop.	1946 Est.	1950 Pop.	Change 1940-50
1	Detroit	Wayne	1,623,452	1,815,000	1,849,568	13.9%
2	Grand Rapids	Kent	164,292		176,515	7.4%
3	Flint	Genesee	151,543		163,143	7.7%
4	Saginaw	Saginaw	82,794		92,918	12.2%
5	Lansing	Ingham	78,753	90,000	92,129	17.0%
6	Pontiac	Oakland	66,626		73,681	10.6%
7	Dearborn	Wayne	63,589		94,994	49.4%
8	Kalamazoo	Kalamazoo	54,097		57,704	6.7%
9	Highland Park	Wayne	50,810		46,393	−8.7%
10	Hamtramck	Wayne	49,839	48,938	43,555	−12.6%
11	Jackson	Jackson	49,656		51,088	2.9%
12	Bay City	Bay	47,956		52,523	9.5%
13	Muskegon	Muskegon	47,697		48,429	1.5%
14	Battle Creek	Calhoun	43,453		48,666	12.0%
15	Port Huron	St. Clair	32,759		35,725	9.1%
16	Wyandotte	Wayne	30,618		36,846	20.3%
17	Ann Arbor	Washtenaw	29,815		48,251	61.8%
18	Royal Oak	Oakland	25,087		46,898	86.9%
19	Ferndale	Oakland	22,523		29,675	31.8%

=== Counties ===
The following is a list of counties in Michigan with populations of at least 75,000 based on 1940 U.S. Census data. Historic census data from 1930 and 1950 are included to reflect trends in population increases or decreases.

1940 Rank	County	Largest city	1930 Pop.	1940 Pop.	1950 Pop.	Change 1940-50
1	Wayne	Detroit	1,888,946	2,015,623	2,435,235	20.8%
2	Oakland	Pontiac	211,251	254,068	396,001	55.9%
3	Kent	Grand Rapids	240,511	246,338	288,292	17.0%
4	Genesee	Flint	211,641	227,944	270,963	18.9%
5	Ingham	Lansing	116,587	130,616	172,941	32.4%
6	Saginaw	Saginaw	120,717	130,468	153,515	17.7%
7	Macomb	Warren	77,146	107,638	184,961	71.8%
8	Kalamazoo	Kalamazoo	91,368	100,085	126,707	26.6%
9	Jackson	Jackson	92,304	93,108	108,168	16.2%
10	Muskegon	Muskegon	84,630	94,501	121,545	28.6%
11	Calhoun	Battle Creek	87,043	94,206	120,813	28.2%

== Companies ==
The following is a list of major companies based in Michigan in 1943.

Company	1943 sales (millions)	1943 net income (millions)	Headquarters	Core business
General Motors			Detroit	Automobiles
Ford Motor Company	na	na		Automobiles
Chrysler				Automobiles
Briggs Mfg. Co.			Detroit	Automobile parts supplier
S. S. Kresge				Retail
Hudson Motor Car Co.			Detroit	Automobiles
Detroit Edison				Electric utility
Michigan Bell				Telephone utility
Kellogg's			Battle Creek	Breakfast cereal
Parke-Davis			Detroit	Pharmaceutical
REO Motor Car Co.			Lansing	Automobiles
Graham-Paige				Automobiles
Burroughs Adding Machine				Business machines

== Sports ==
=== Baseball ===
- 1943 Detroit Tigers season – The Tigers compiled a 78–76 record and finished in fifth place in the American League. The team's statistical leaders included Dick Wakefield with a .316 batting average, Rudy York with 34 home runs and 118 RBIs, Dizzy Trout with 20 wins, and Tommy Bridges with a 2.39 earned run average.
- 1943 Michigan Wolverines baseball season - Under head coach Ray Fisher, the Wolverines compiled an 8–4 record. Don Robinson was the team captain.

=== American football ===
- 1943 Detroit Lions season – Under head coach Gus Dorais, the Lions compiled a 3–6–1 record. The team's statistical leaders included Frankie Sinkwich with 699 passing yards and 266 rushing yards and Harry Hopp with 54 points scored.
- 1943 Michigan Wolverines football team – Under head coach Fritz Crisler, the Wolverines compiled an 8–1 record, tied with Purdue for the Big Ten Conference championship, and were ranked No. 3 in the final AP Poll. Fullback Bill Daley finished seventh in the voting for the Heisman Trophy and was selected as a consensus All-American.
- 1943 Central Michigan Chippewas football team - Under head coach Ron Finch, the Chippewas compiled a 2–3 record, were shut out in all three losses, and were outscored by all opponents by a combined total of 69 to 20.
- 1943 Michigan State Normal Hurons football team - Under head coach Elton Rynearson, the Hurons compiled an undefeated record of 2–0, playing two games against Wayne State and winning both games by identical 14–0 scores.
- 1943 Western Michigan Broncos football team - Under head coach John Gill, the Broncos compiled a 4–2 record and outscored their opponents, 151 to 89.

=== Basketball ===
- 1942–43 Michigan Wolverines men's basketball team – Under head coach Bennie Oosterbaan, the Wolverines compiled a 10–8 record.
- 1942–43 Western Michigan Broncos men's basketball team – Under head coach Buck Read, the Broncos compiled a 15-4 record.
- 1942–43 Detroit Titans men's basketball team – Under head coach Lloyd Brazil, the Titans compiled a 15-5 record.

=== Ice hockey ===
- 1942–43 Detroit Red Wings season – Under head coach Jack Adams, the Red Wings compiled a 25-14-11 record, finished first in the NHL, and defeated the Boston Bruins, four games to zero, in the 1943 Stanley Cup Finals. Sid Abel was the team captain, and the team's statistical leaders included Mud Bruneteau with 23 goals and Syd Howe with 35 assists and 55 points. Johnny Mowers was the goaltender.
- 1942–43 Michigan Wolverines men's ice hockey team – The team compiled a 1–10–2 record under coach Ed Lowrey.
- 1942–43 Michigan Tech Huskies men's ice hockey team – The team compiled a 1–9 record under coach Elwin Romnes.

== Chronology of events ==
- April 1–8 – The 1943 Stanley Cup Finals took place in Detroit and Boston. The Red Wings won the series, four games to zero.
- June 20–22 – The Detroit race riot of 1943 took place. The rioting began among youths at Belle Isle Park on June 20, 1943; the unrest moved into the city and was exacerbated by false rumors of racial attacks in both the black and white communities. It continued until June 22. It was suppressed after 6,000 federal troops were ordered into the city to restore peace. A total of 34 people were killed, 25 of them black and most at the hands of white police or National Guardsmen; 433 were wounded, 75 percent of them black; and property valued at $2 million ($27.5 million in 2015 US dollars) was destroyed, most of it in the black area of Paradise Valley, the poorest neighborhood of the city.

== Births ==
- January 15 – Mike Marshall, Major League Baseball pitcher (1967–1981) and 1974 Cy Young Award winner, in Adrian, Michigan
- February 5 – Craig Morton, NFL quarterback (1965–1982) and AFC Offensive Player of the Year (1977), in Flint
- February 9 – Barbara Lewis, singer ("Hello Stranger", "Baby I'm Yours"), in Salem, Michigan
- February 16 – Iris Gordy, music songwriter and producer who helped launch the careers of DeBarge, Teena Marie, and Rick James, in Detroit
- March 10 – Bruce Joel Rubin, Academy Award winning screenwriter (Ghost), in Detroit
- March 11 – Peter Karmanos Jr., majority owner and chief executive officer of the Carolina Hurricanes of the NHL, in Detroit
- April 5 – Max Gail, actor (Detective Wojciehowicz on Barney Miller), in Detroit
- May 13 – Mary Wells, singer who helped to define the emerging sound of Motown in the early 1960s, in Detroit
- June – Barbara Martin, one of the original members of The Supremes, in Detroit
- June 6 – Merv Rettenmund, Major League Baseball outfielder (1968–1980), in Flint
- June 30 – Florence Ballard, founding member of the Motown vocal group The Supremes, in Detroit
- July 4 – Annette Beard, R&B and soul singer best known as an original member of the singing group Martha and the Vandellas, in Detroit
- July 18 – Calvin Peete, professional golfer, in Detroit
- August 2 – Max Wright, actor, best known for his role as Willie Tanner on the sitcom ALF, in Detroit
- August 9 – Wanda Young, member and co-lead singer of the Motown singing group The Marvelettes, in Inkster, Michigan
- September 2 – Rosalind Ashford, soprano R&B and soul singer, an original member of the Motown singing group Martha and the Vandellas, in Detroit
- September 21 – Jerry Bruckheimer, film and television producer (Beverly Hills Cop, Flashdance, Top Gun, Armageddon, Black Hawk Down, Pirates of the Caribbean film series), in Detroit
- December 26 – Fleming Williams, singer known as a member of the group The Hues Corporation and as the lead singer on their hit "Rock the Boat", in Flint

== Deaths ==
- January 10 –
  - George A. Schroeder, former Speaker of the Michigan House of Representatives, at age 48 in Detroit
  - Charles J. DeLand, Michigan Secretary of State (1921-1926), at age 63 in Detroit
- January 15 – Gustave Ferbert, player and head coach of the Michigan Wolverines football team (1893-1899) who left Ann Arbor for the Klondike Gold Rush, at age 69 in Cleveland
- April 22 – Luren Dickinson, anti-liquor crusader and Governor of Michigan (1939-1941), at age 84 in Charlotte, Michigan
- March 16 – Paul Bunker, Alpena native, All-American football player at West Point, and career Army officer who died as a Japanese POW, at age 61 in Formosa
- May 3 – Harry Miller, race car designer, his "Miller Specials" won the Indianapolis 500 11 times, at age 67 in Detroit
- May 7 – Bill Coughlin, third baseman for the Washington Senators (1901–1904) and Detroit Tigers (1904–1908), at age 64 in Scranton, Pennsylvania
- May 26 – Edsel Ford, President of Ford Motor Co. (1919-1943), at age 49 in Grosse Pointe Shores, Michigan
- August 16 – Albert Benbrook, All-American lineman at Michigan (1909-1910), at age 55 in Dallas
- December 14 – John Harvey Kellogg, medical doctor who ran a sanitarium with a particular focus on nutrition, enemas, and exercise, best known for the invention of corn flakes, at age 91 in Battle Creek, Michigan

== See also ==
- History of Michigan
- History of Detroit
