= 1945 in Michigan =

- Decades: 1920s; 1930s; 1940s; 1950s; 1960s
- See also: History of Michigan; Historical outline of Michigan; List of years in Michigan; 1945 in the United States

Events from the year 1945 in Michigan.

== Top stories ==
The Associated Press polled editors of its member newspapers in Michigan and ranked the state's top news stories of 1945 as follows:

1. The murder of State Senator Warren G. Hooper by shooting in his car near his home in Albion. Hooper was a witness in the corruption investigation of Leland W. Carr. Four Detroit men were convicted of conspiracy to commit the murder. (159 points)
2. Labor unrest and a strike against General Motors (137 points)
3. The expose by Attorney General John R. Dethmers of immorality, favoritism, and gambling at Jackson State Prison (124 points)
4. The Detroit Tigers defeated the Chicago Cubs in seven games in the 1945 World Series. Hal Newhouser won the pitching triple crown (leading the American League in wins, strikeouts, and earned run average) and was named the American League Most Valuable Player for the second consecutive year. (101 points)
5. Oakland County murders (94 points)
6. Hamonic steamship fire (70 points)
7. Post-war conversion (64 points)
8. Re-election of Edward Jeffries as Mayor of Detroit (54 points)
9. Governors' convention on Mackinac Island (29 points)
10. Detroit boxing plant fire (26 points)

== Office holders ==
=== State office holders ===
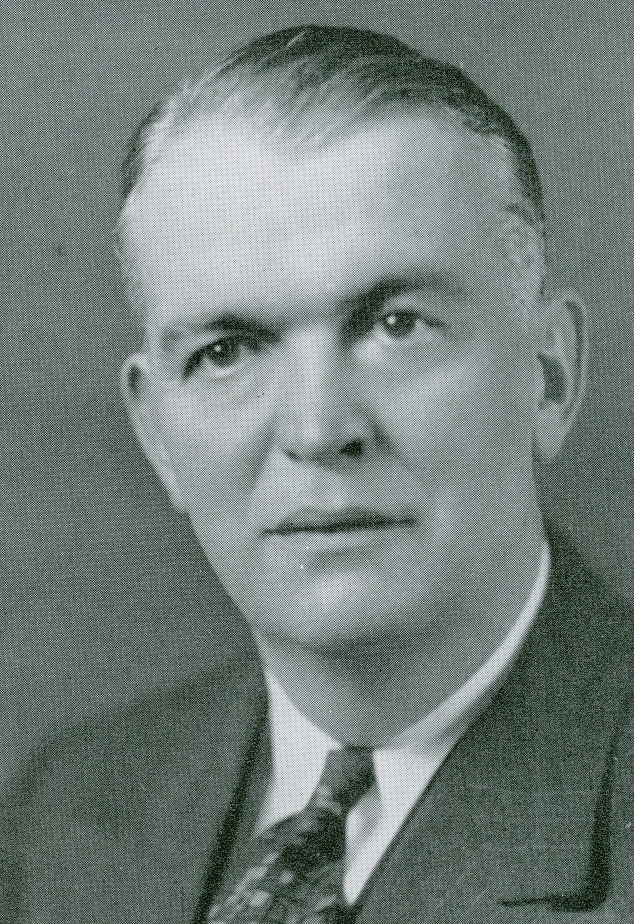
Gov. Harry Kelly

- Governor of Michigan: Harry Kelly (Republican)
- Lieutenant Governor of Michigan: Eugene C. Keyes (Republican)/Vernon J. Brown (Republican)
- Michigan Attorney General: John R. Dethmers (Republican)
- Michigan Secretary of State: Herman H. Dignan (Republican)
- Speaker of the Michigan House of Representatives: Howard Nugent (Republican)
- Chief Justice, Michigan Supreme Court: Raymond Wesley Starr

=== Mayors of major cities ===
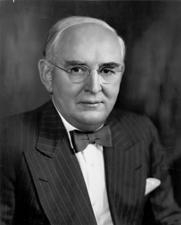
Sen. Arthur Vandenberg

- Mayor of Detroit: Edward Jeffries (Republican)
- Mayor of Grand Rapids: George W. Welsh (Republican)
- Mayor of Flint: Edwin C. McLogan
- Mayor of Lansing: Ralph Crego
- Mayor of Dearborn: Orville L. Hubbard
- Mayor of Saginaw: Eric F. Wieneke/Harold J. Stenglein
- Mayor of Ann Arbor: Leigh J. Young/William E. Brown Jr.

=== Federal office holders ===
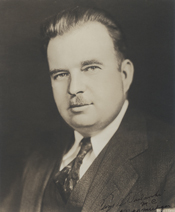
George Sadowski

- U.S. Senator from Michigan: Homer S. Ferguson (Republican)
- U.S. Senator from Michigan: Arthur Vandenberg (Republican)
- House District 1: George G. Sadowski (Democrat)
- House District 2: Earl C. Michener (Republican)
- House District 3: Paul W. Shafer (Republican)
- House District 4: Clare Hoffman (Republican)
- House District 5: Bartel J. Jonkman (Republican)
- House District 6: William W. Blackney (Republican)
- House District 7: Jesse P. Wolcott (Republican)
- House District 8: Fred L. Crawford (Republican)
- House District 9: Albert J. Engel (Republican)
- House District 10: Roy O. Woodruff (Republican)
- House District 11: Frederick Van Ness Bradley (Republican)
- House District 12: Frank Eugene Hook (Democrat)
- House District 13: George D. O'Brien (Democrat)
- House District 14: Louis C. Rabaut (Democrat)
- House District 15: John D. Dingell Sr. (Democrat)
- House District 16: John Lesinski Sr. (Democrat)
- House District 17: George Anthony Dondero (Republican)

== Population ==
In the 1940 United States census, Michigan was recorded as having a population of 5,256,106, ranking as the seventh most populous state in the country. By 1950, Michigan's population had increased by 21.2% to 6,371,766.

=== Cities ===
The following is a list of cities in Michigan with a population of at least 20,000 based on 1940 U.S. Census data. Historic census data from 1930 and 1950 is included to reflect trends in population increases or decreases. Cities that are part of the Detroit metropolitan area are shaded in tan.

1940 Rank	City	County	1940 Pop.	1946 Est.	1950 Pop.	Change 1940-50
1	Detroit	Wayne	1,623,452	1,815,000	1,849,568	13.9%
2	Grand Rapids	Kent	164,292		176,515	7.4%
3	Flint	Genesee	151,543		163,143	7.7%
4	Saginaw	Saginaw	82,794		92,918	12.2%
5	Lansing	Ingham	78,753	90,000	92,129	17.0%
6	Pontiac	Oakland	66,626		73,681	10.6%
7	Dearborn	Wayne	63,589		94,994	49.4%
8	Kalamazoo	Kalamazoo	54,097		57,704	6.7%
9	Highland Park	Wayne	50,810		46,393	−8.7%
10	Hamtramck	Wayne	49,839	48,938	43,555	−12.6%
11	Jackson	Jackson	49,656		51,088	2.9%
12	Bay City	Bay	47,956		52,523	9.5%
13	Muskegon	Muskegon	47,697		48,429	1.5%
14	Battle Creek	Calhoun	43,453		48,666	12.0%
15	Port Huron	St. Clair	32,759		35,725	9.1%
16	Wyandotte	Wayne	30,618		36,846	20.3%
17	Ann Arbor	Washtenaw	29,815		48,251	61.8%
18	Royal Oak	Oakland	25,087		46,898	86.9%
19	Ferndale	Oakland	22,523		29,675	31.8%

=== Counties ===
The following is a list of counties in Michigan with populations of at least 75,000 based on 1940 U.S. Census data. Historic census data from 1930 and 1950 are included to reflect trends in population increases or decreases.

1940 Rank	County	Largest city	1930 Pop.	1940 Pop.	1950 Pop.	Change 1940-50
1	Wayne	Detroit	1,888,946	2,015,623	2,435,235	20.8%
2	Oakland	Pontiac	211,251	254,068	396,001	55.9%
3	Kent	Grand Rapids	240,511	246,338	288,292	17.0%
4	Genesee	Flint	211,641	227,944	270,963	18.9%
5	Ingham	Lansing	116,587	130,616	172,941	32.4%
6	Saginaw	Saginaw	120,717	130,468	153,515	17.7%
7	Macomb	Warren	77,146	107,638	184,961	71.8%
8	Kalamazoo	Kalamazoo	91,368	100,085	126,707	26.6%
9	Jackson	Jackson	92,304	93,108	108,168	16.2%
10	Muskegon	Muskegon	84,630	94,501	121,545	28.6%
11	Calhoun	Battle Creek	87,043	94,206	120,813	28.2%

== Companies ==
The following is a list of major companies based in Michigan in 1945.

Company	1945 sales (millions)	1945 net earnings (millions)	Headquarters	Core business
General Motors			Detroit	Automobiles
Ford Motor Company	na	na		Automobiles
Chrysler				Automobiles
Studebaker Corp.				Automobiles
Briggs Mfg. Co.			Detroit	Automobile parts supplier
S. S. Kresge				Retail
Hudson Motor Car Co.			Detroit	Automobiles
Detroit Edison				Electric utility
Michigan Bell				Telephone utility
Kellogg's			Battle Creek	Breakfast cereal
Parke-Davis			Detroit	Pharmaceutical
REO Motor Car Co.			Lansing	Automobiles
Burroughs Adding Machine				Business machines

== Sports ==
=== Baseball ===
- 1945 Detroit Tigers season – The Tigers compiled an 88-65 record, won the American League pennant, led the league with attendance of 1,280,341, and defeated the Chicago Cubs in the 1945 World Series. Pitcher Hal Newhouser compiled a 25-9 record and a 1.81 earned run average and won the American League Most Valuable Player award for the second consecutive year. The team's other statistical leaders included Hank Greenberg with a .311 batting average and Roy Cullenbine with 90 RBIs.
- 1945 Michigan Wolverines baseball season - Under head coach Ray Fisher, the Wolverines compiled a 20–1 record and won the Big Ten Conference championship. Don Lund was the team captain.

=== American football ===
- 1945 Detroit Lions season – Under head coach Gus Dorais, the Lions compiled a 7–3 record and finished in second place in the NFL's Western Conference. The team's statistical leaders included Chuck Fenenbock with 754 passing yards, Bob Westfall with 234 rushing yards, and John Greene with 550 receiving yards.
- 1945 Michigan Wolverines football team – Under head coach was Fritz Crisler, the Wolverines compiled a 7–3 record and finished the season ranked No. 6 in the final AP Poll.
- 1945 Michigan State Spartans football team – Under head coach Charlie Bachman, the Spartans compiled a 5–3–1 record.
- 1945 Detroit Titans football team – Under head coach Chuck Baer, the Titans outscored their opponents by a combined total of 193 to 114 and compiled a 6–3 record.

=== Basketball ===
- 1944–45 Michigan Wolverines men's basketball team – Under head coach Bennie Oosterbaan, the Wolverines compiled a 12–7 record. Robert Geahan was the team's leading scorer with 136 points in 19 games for an average of 7.2 points per game.
- 1944–45 Michigan State Spartans men's basketball team – Under Benjamin Van Alstyne, the Spartans compiled a 9–7 record.
- 1944–45 Western Michigan Broncos men's basketball team – Under head coach Buck Read, the Broncos compiled an 8–10 record.
- 1944–45 Detroit Titans men's basketball team – Under head coach Lloyd Brazil, the Titans compiled an 8–12 record.

=== Ice hockey ===
- 1944–45 Detroit Red Wings season – Under head coach Jack Adams, the Red Wings compiled a 31–14–5 record and finished second in the NHL. The team's statistical leaders included Joe Carveth with 26 goals and 54 points and Syd Howe with 36 assists. Harry Lumley was the team's principal goaltender.

=== Other ===
- Michigan Open - Chuck Kocsis won the tournament at Cascade Hills Country Club in Grand Rapids.
- Port Huron to Mackinac Boat Race –

== Births ==
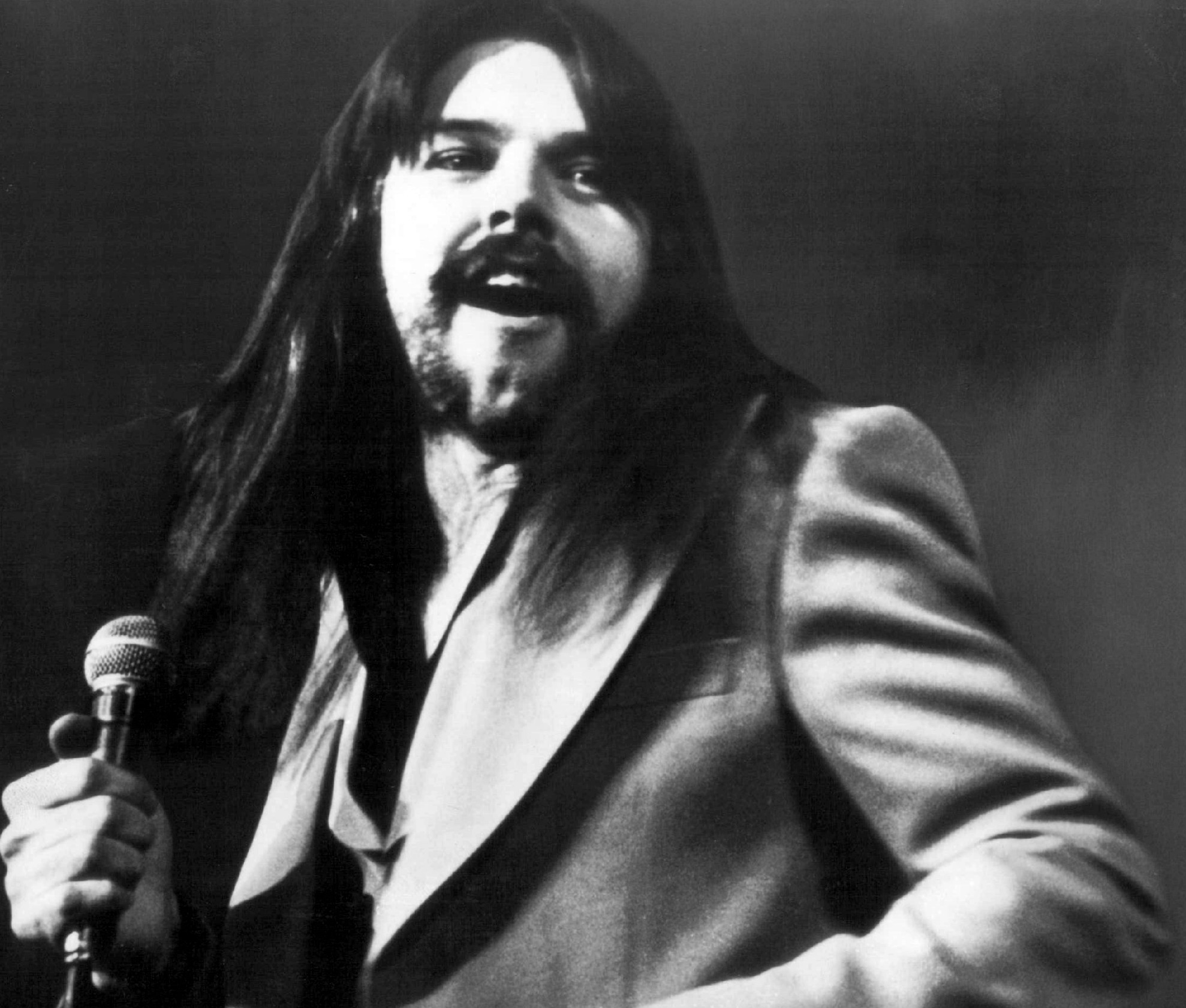
Bob Seger

- January 29 - Tom Selleck, actor (Magnum, P.I., Three Men and a Baby), in Detroit
- January 29 - Donna Caponi, professional golfer, winner of four major championships, and a member of the World Golf Hall of Fame, in Detroit
- February 26 - Mitch Ryder, musician and leader of Mitch Ryder & The Detroit Wheels ("Devil with a Blue Dress On"), in Detroit
- March 11 - Harvey Mandel, one of the first rock guitarists to use two-handed fretboard tapping, in Detroit
- March 29 - George Blaha, radio and television play-by-play voice of the Detroit Pistons since 1976, in Detroit
- March 31 - Mike Bass, cornerback for Washington Redskins (1969–1975), scored their only touchdown in Super Bowl VII, in Ypsilanti, Michigan
- May 6 - Bob Seger, singer-songwriter, guitarist and pianist ("Night Moves", "Old Time Rock and Roll"), in Detroit
- June 6 - David Bonior, U.S. Congressman (1977–2003) and whip (1991–2002), in Detroit
- June 25 - Carolyn Cheeks Kilpatrick, U.S. Congresswoman (1997–2011) and mother of Kwame Kilpatrick, in Detroit
- September 13 - Rick Wise, Major League Baseball pitcher (1980–1982) and 2× All-Star (1971, 1973), in Jackson, Michigan
- November 2 - JD Souther, musician, singer-songwriter ("Best of My Love", Heartache Tonight", and "You're Only Lonely"), and actor, in Detroit
- December 17 - Ernie Hudson, actor (Ghostbusters film series, HBO's Oz), in Benton Harbor, Michigan

=== Gallery of 1945 births ===
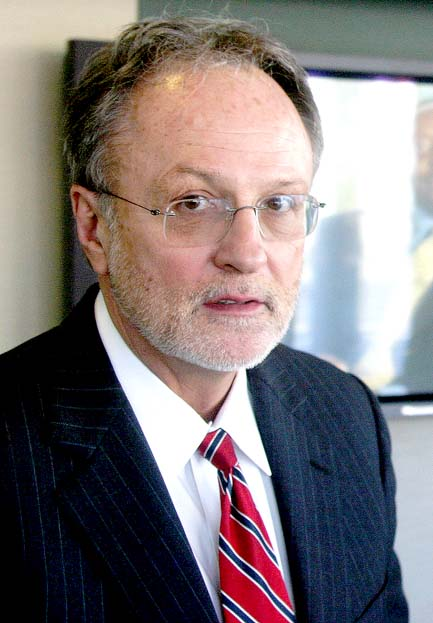
David Bonior

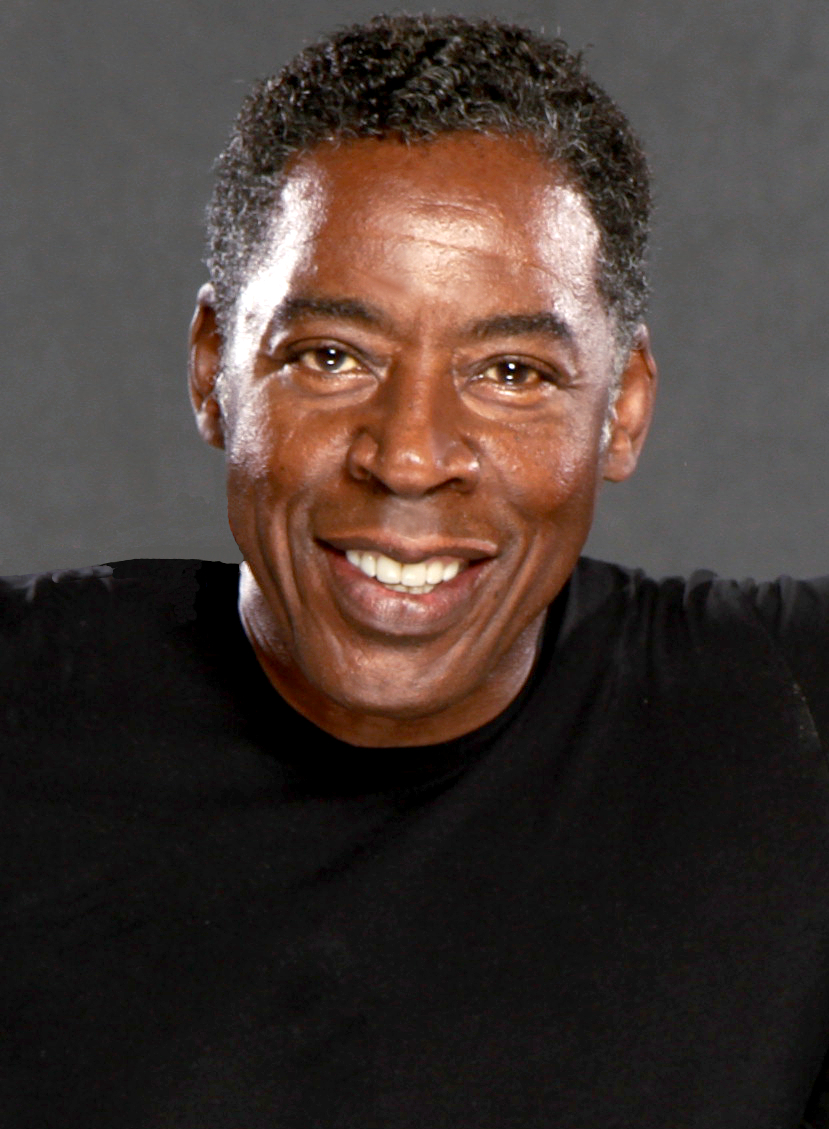
Ernie Hudson

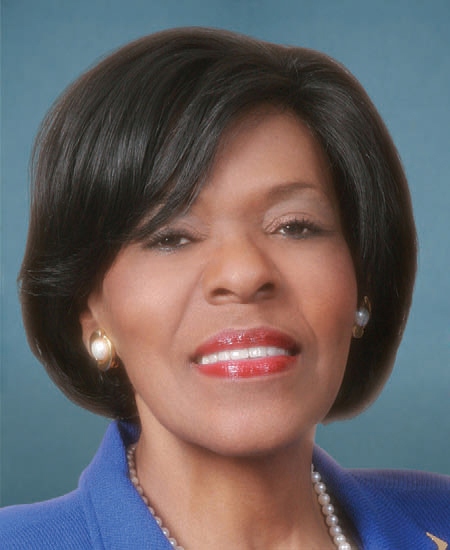
Carolyn Cheeks Kilpatrick

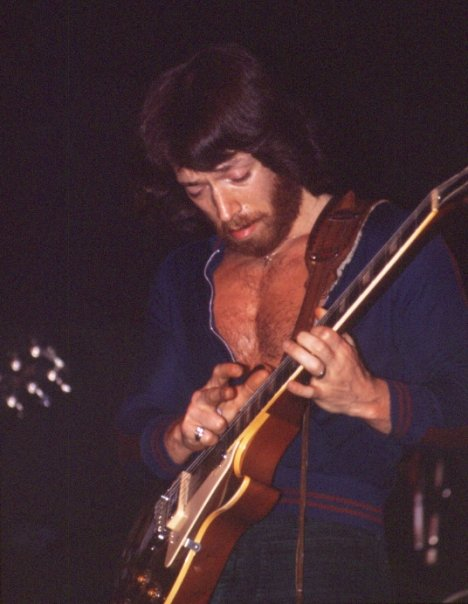
Harvey Mandel

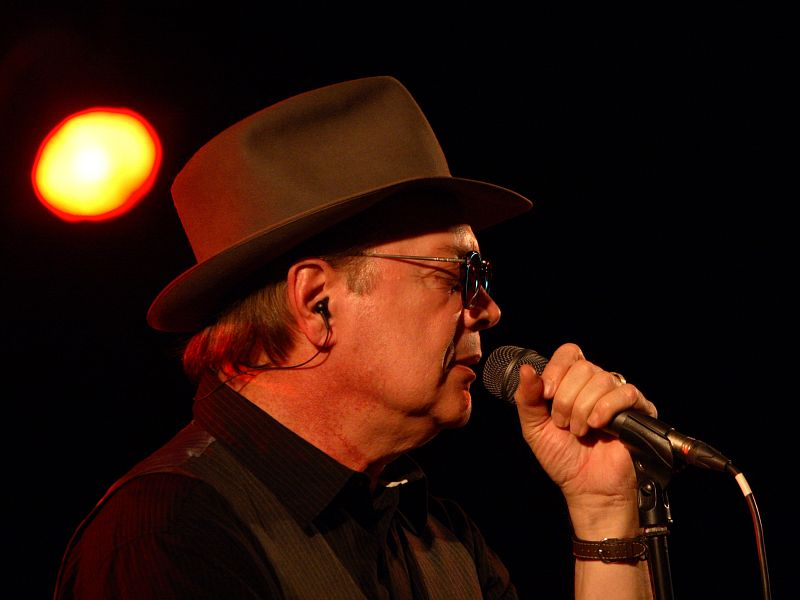
Mitch Ryder

Tom Selleck

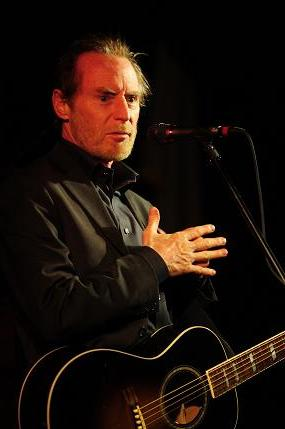
JD Souther

== Deaths ==
- January 31 - Eddie Slovik, only American soldier to be court-martialled and executed for desertion since the American Civil War, at age 24 by execution in France
- May 21 - Horace B. Carpenter, actor, film director and, screenwriter, at age 70 in Hollywood
- October 3 - Truman Handy Newberry, U.S. Secretary of the Navy (1908–1909) and U.S. Senator (1919–1922), at age 80 in Detroit

== See also ==
- History of Michigan
- History of Detroit
