= 1944 in Michigan =

- Decades: 1920s; 1930s; 1940s; 1950s; 1960s
- See also: History of Michigan; Historical outline of Michigan; List of years in Michigan; 1944 in the United States

Events from the year 1944 in Michigan.

== Top stories ==
The Associated Press polled editors of its member newspapers in Michigan and ranked the state's top news stories of 1944 as follows:

1. Judge Leland Carr's grand jury investigation into graft in the Michigan Legislature (213 points)
2. Dewey loses Michigan to Roosevelt
3. Gov. Kelly defeats Frank McKay as Republican national committeeman
4. Strike hamper war production
5. Detroit Tigers finish in second place in the American League, one game out of first
6. Principals of Detroit spy ring sentenced to long terms
7. Fisher Brothers leave General Motors to found their own company
8. The acquittal of David Filgas in the torch death of Patricia Winters
9. Mistakes snarl vote-counting in November election

== Office holders ==
=== State office holders ===
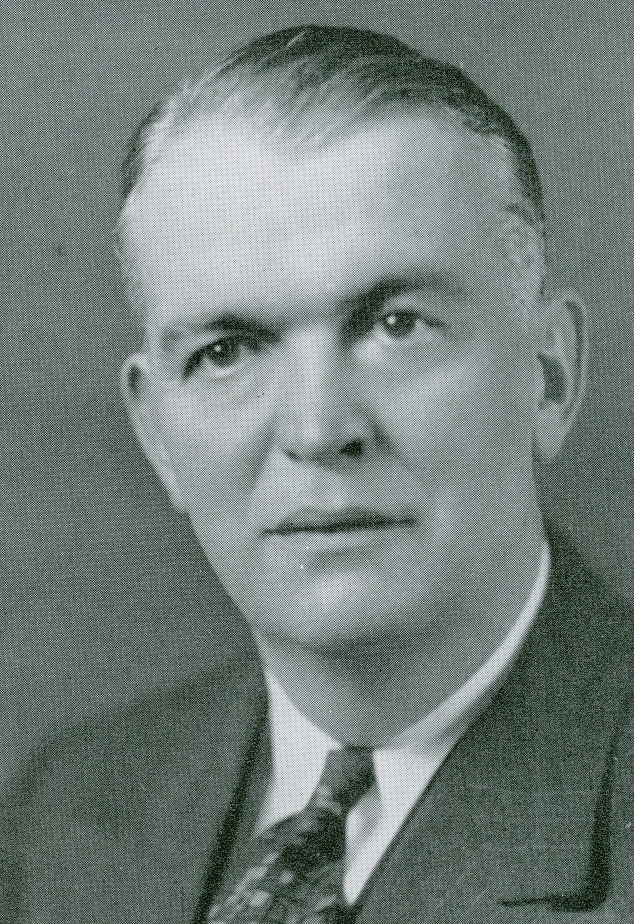
Gov. Harry Kelly

- Governor of Michigan: Harry Kelly (Republican)
- Lieutenant Governor of Michigan: Eugene C. Keyes (Republican)
- Michigan Attorney General: Herbert J. Rushton (Republican)
- Michigan Secretary of State: Herman H. Dignan (Republican)
- Speaker of the Michigan House of Representatives: Howard Nugent (Republican)
- Chief Justice, Michigan Supreme Court: Walter Harper North

=== Mayors of major cities ===
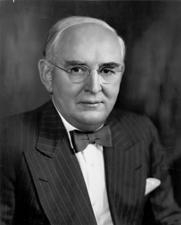
Sen. Arthur Vandenberg

- Mayor of Detroit: Edward Jeffries (Republican)
- Mayor of Grand Rapids: George W. Welsh (Republican)
- Mayor of Flint: William Osmund Kelly/Edwin C. McLogan
- Mayor of Lansing: Ralph Crego
- Mayor of Dearborn: Orville L. Hubbard
- Mayor of Saginaw: Eric F. Wieneke
- Mayor of Ann Arbor: Leigh J. Young

=== Federal office holders ===
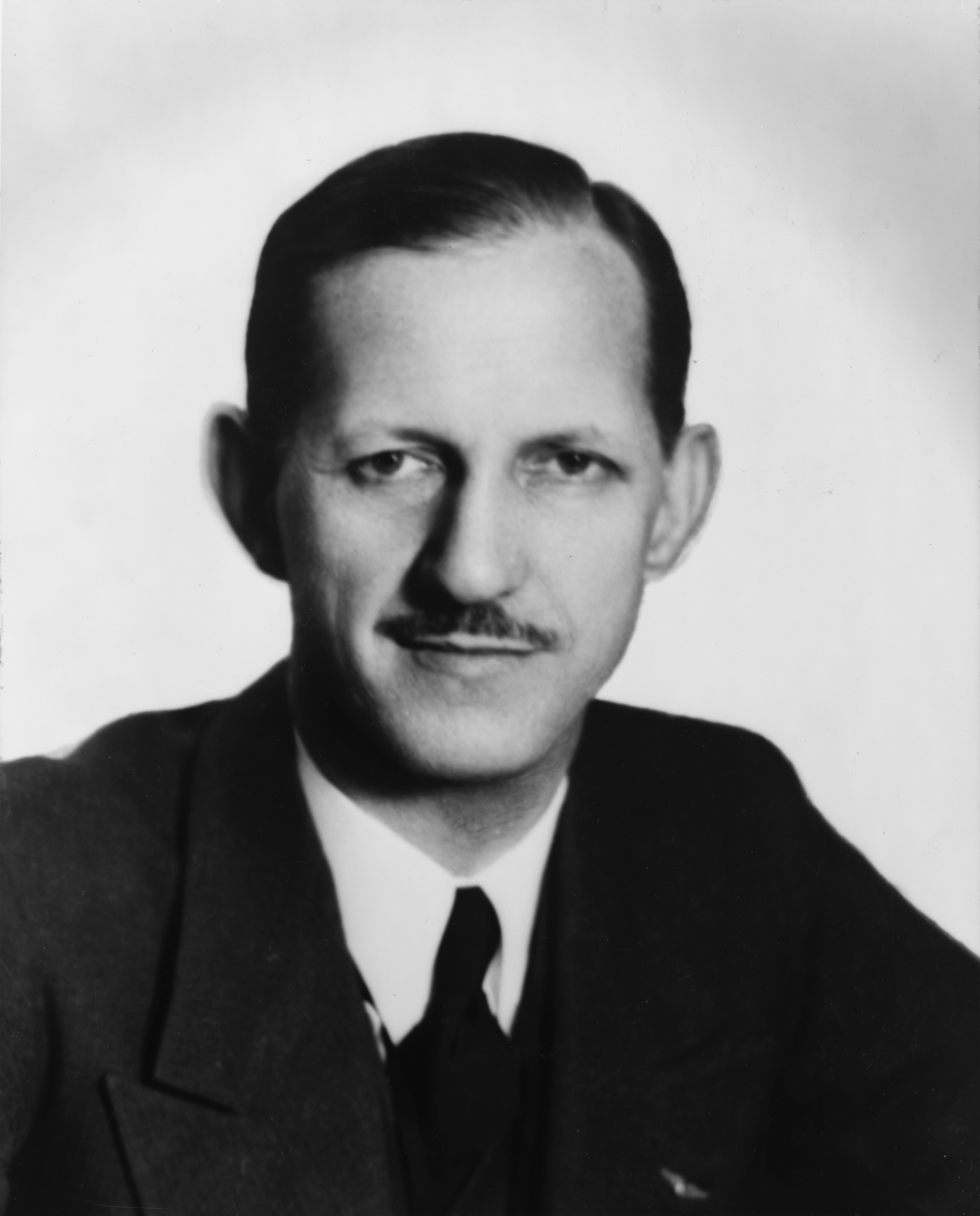
Rep. John Dingell Sr.

- U.S. Senator from Michigan: Homer S. Ferguson (Republican)
- U.S. Senator from Michigan: Arthur Vandenberg (Republican)
- House District 1: George G. Sadowski (Democrat)
- House District 2: Earl C. Michener (Republican)
- House District 3: Paul W. Shafer (Republican)
- House District 4: Clare Hoffman (Republican)
- House District 5: Bartel J. Jonkman (Republican)
- House District 6: William W. Blackney (Republican)
- House District 7: Jesse P. Wolcott (Republican)
- House District 8: Fred L. Crawford (Republican)
- House District 9: Albert J. Engel (Republican)
- House District 10: Roy O. Woodruff (Republican)
- House District 11: Frederick Van Ness Bradley (Republican)
- House District 12: John B. Bennett (Republican)
- House District 13: George D. O'Brien (Democrat)
- House District 14: Louis C. Rabaut (Democrat)
- House District 15: John D. Dingell Sr. (Democrat)
- House District 16: John Lesinski Sr. (Democrat)
- House District 17: George Anthony Dondero (Republican)

== Population ==
In the 1940 United States census, Michigan was recorded as having a population of 5,256,106, ranking as the seventh most populous state in the country. By 1950, Michigan's population had increased by 21.2% to 6,371,766.

=== Cities ===
The following is a list of cities in Michigan with a population of at least 20,000 based on 1940 U.S. Census data. Historic census data from 1930 and 1950 is included to reflect trends in population increases or decreases. Cities that are part of the Detroit metropolitan area are shaded in tan.

| 1940 Rank | City | County | 1940 Pop. | 1946 Est. | 1950 Pop. | Change 1940-50 |
|---|---|---|---|---|---|---|
| 1 | Detroit | Wayne | 1,623,452 | 1,815,000 | 1,849,568 | 13.9% |
| 2 | Grand Rapids | Kent | 164,292 | | 176,515 | 7.4% |
| 3 | Flint | Genesee | 151,543 | | 163,143 | 7.7% |
| 4 | Saginaw | Saginaw | 82,794 | | 92,918 | 12.2% |
| 5 | Lansing | Ingham | 78,753 | 90,000 | 92,129 | 17.0% |
| 6 | Pontiac | Oakland | 66,626 | | 73,681 | 10.6% |
| 7 | Dearborn | Wayne | 63,589 | | 94,994 | 49.4% |
| 8 | Kalamazoo | Kalamazoo | 54,097 | | 57,704 | 6.7% |
| 9 | Highland Park | Wayne | 50,810 | | 46,393 | −8.7% |
| 10 | Hamtramck | Wayne | 49,839 | 48,938 | 43,555 | −12.6% |
| 11 | Jackson | Jackson | 49,656 | | 51,088 | 2.9% |
| 12 | Bay City | Bay | 47,956 | | 52,523 | 9.5% |
| 13 | Muskegon | Muskegon | 47,697 | | 48,429 | 1.5% |
| 14 | Battle Creek | Calhoun | 43,453 | | 48,666 | 12.0% |
| 15 | Port Huron | St. Clair | 32,759 | | 35,725 | 9.1% |
| 16 | Wyandotte | Wayne | 30,618 | | 36,846 | 20.3% |
| 17 | Ann Arbor | Washtenaw | 29,815 | | 48,251 | 61.8% |
| 18 | Royal Oak | Oakland | 25,087 | | 46,898 | 86.9% |
| 19 | Ferndale | Oakland | 22,523 | | 29,675 | 31.8% |

=== Counties ===
The following is a list of counties in Michigan with populations of at least 75,000 based on 1940 U.S. Census data. Historic census data from 1930 and 1950 are included to reflect trends in population increases or decreases.

| 1940 Rank | County | Largest city | 1930 Pop. | 1940 Pop. | 1950 Pop. | Change 1940-50 |
|---|---|---|---|---|---|---|
| 1 | Wayne | Detroit | 1,888,946 | 2,015,623 | 2,435,235 | 20.8% |
| 2 | Oakland | Pontiac | 211,251 | 254,068 | 396,001 | 55.9% |
| 3 | Kent | Grand Rapids | 240,511 | 246,338 | 288,292 | 17.0% |
| 4 | Genesee | Flint | 211,641 | 227,944 | 270,963 | 18.9% |
| 5 | Ingham | Lansing | 116,587 | 130,616 | 172,941 | 32.4% |
| 6 | Saginaw | Saginaw | 120,717 | 130,468 | 153,515 | 17.7% |
| 7 | Macomb | Warren | 77,146 | 107,638 | 184,961 | 71.8% |
| 8 | Kalamazoo | Kalamazoo | 91,368 | 100,085 | 126,707 | 26.6% |
| 9 | Jackson | Jackson | 92,304 | 93,108 | 108,168 | 16.2% |
| 10 | Muskegon | Muskegon | 84,630 | 94,501 | 121,545 | 28.6% |
| 11 | Calhoun | Battle Creek | 87,043 | 94,206 | 120,813 | 28.2% |

== Companies ==
The following is a list of major companies based in Michigan in 1944.

| Company | 1944 sales (millions) | 1944 net income (millions) | Headquarters | Core business |
|---|---|---|---|---|
| General Motors | $4,262.2 | $171.0 | Detroit | Automobiles |
| Ford Motor Company | na | na | | Automobiles |
| Chrysler | | | | Automobiles |
| Briggs Mfg. Co. | | | Detroit | Automobile parts supplier |
| S. S. Kresge | | | | Retail |
| Hudson Motor Car Co. | | | Detroit | Automobiles |
| Detroit Edison | | | | Electric utility |
| Michigan Bell | | $9.3 | | Telephone utility |
| Kellogg's | | | Battle Creek | Breakfast cereal |
| Parke-Davis | | | Detroit | Pharmaceutical |
| REO Motor Car Co. | | | Lansing | Automobiles |
| Graham-Paige | | $1.8 | | Automobiles |
| Burroughs Adding Machine | | | | Business machines |

== Sports ==
=== Baseball ===
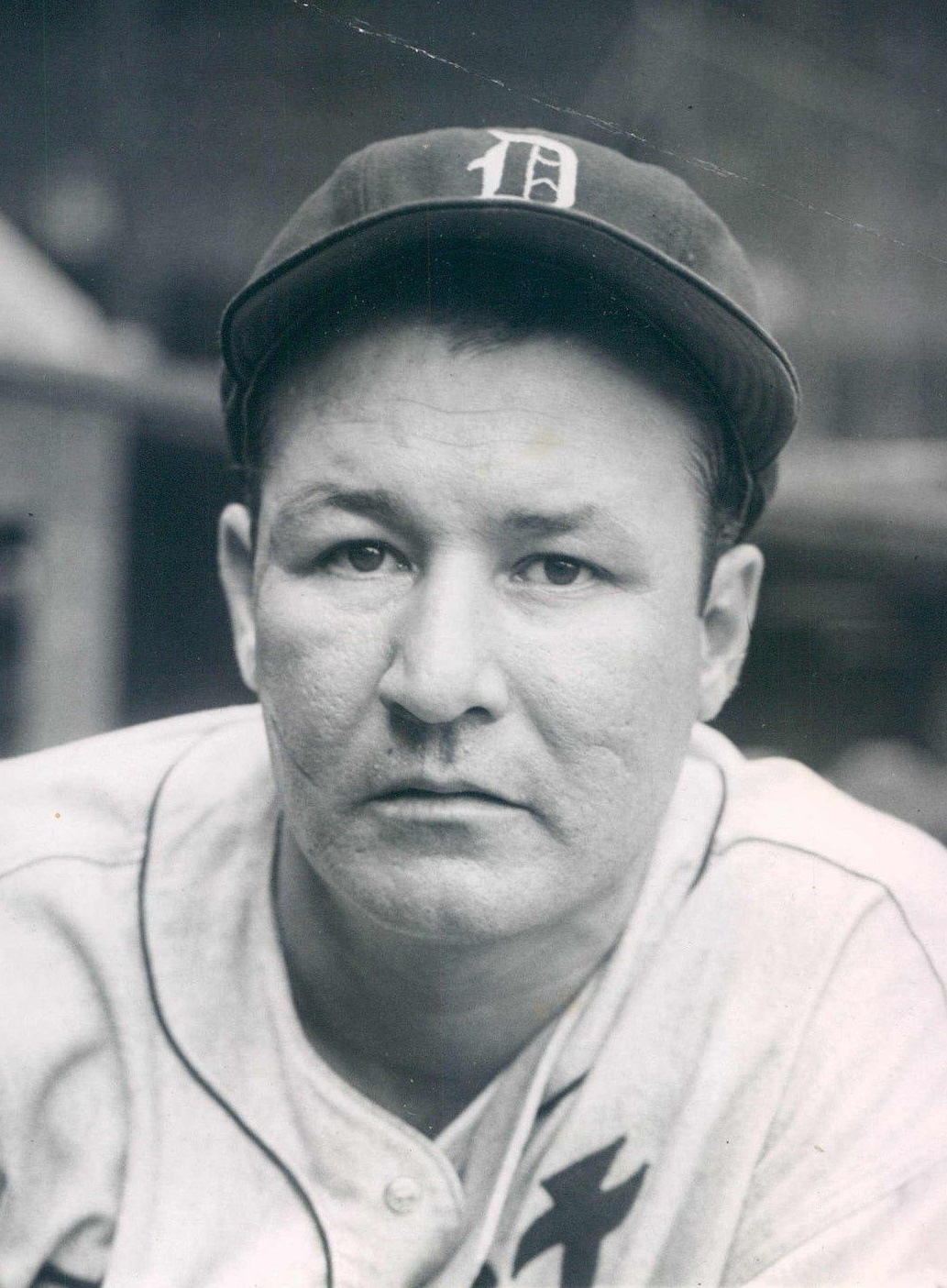
Rudy York

- 1944 Detroit Tigers season – The Tigers compiled an 88–66 record and finished one game behind the St. Louis Browns. The team had one of the best pitching staffs in club history. Hal Newhouser was selected as the American League Most Valuable Player after compiling a 29–9 record and leading the league with 187 strikeouts. Dizzy Trout finished second in the AL MVP voting after leading the league with a 2.12 earned run average, 33 complete games, and seven shutouts. The team's batting leaders included first baseman Rudy York with 18 home runs and 98 RBIs and Dick Wakefield with a .355 batting average.
- 1944 Michigan Wolverines baseball season - Under head coach Ray Fisher, the Wolverines compiled a 15–4–1 record and won the Big Ten Conference championship. Howard Wike was the team captain.

=== American football ===
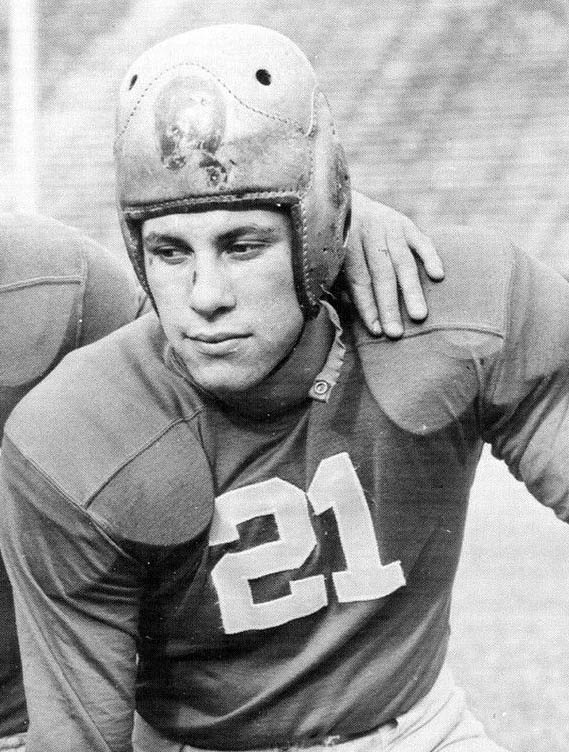
Frankie Sinkwich

- 1944 Detroit Lions season – Under head coach Gus Dorais, the Lions compiled a 6–3–1 record and finished second in the NFL's Western Conference. Frankie Sinkwich led the team with 1,060 passing yards and 563 rushing yards. Bob Westfall added 342 passing yards and 277 rushing yards.
- 1944 Michigan Wolverines football team – Under head coach Fritz Crisler, the Wolverines compiled an 8–2 record, outscored opponents 204 to 91, finished in second place in the Big Nine Conference, and were ranked No. 8 in the final AP Poll. Tackle Milan Lazetich, quarterback Joe Ponsetto, and fullback Bob Wiese were selected as first-team players on the All-Big Ten Conference team.
- 1944 Michigan State Spartans football team – Under head coach Charlie Bachman, the Spartans compiled a 6–1 record and outscored opponents 167 to 31.
- 1944 Western Michigan Broncos football team - Under head coach John Gill, the Broncos compiled a 4–3 record and outscored their opponents, 162 to 123.
- 1944 Central Michigan Chippewas football team - Under head coach Ron Finch, the Chippewas compiled a 5–2 record and outscored all opponents by a combined total of 150 to 106.

=== Basketball ===
- 1943–44 Western Michigan Broncos men's basketball team – Under head coach Buck Read, the Broncos compiled a 15–4 record.
- 1943–44 Michigan Wolverines men's basketball team – Under head coach Bennie Oosterbaan, the Wolverines finished the season in a tie for sixth place in the Big Nine Conference with a 12–7 record. Dave Strack was the team's acting captain and led the team in scoring with 194 points.
- 1943–44 Detroit Titans men's basketball team – Under head coach Lloyd Brazil, the Titans compiled a 13–7 record.

=== Ice hockey ===
- 1943–44 Detroit Red Wings season – Under head coach Jack Adams, the Red Wings compiled a 26–18–6 record, finished second in the NHL, and lost to the Chicago Black Hawks in the playoffs. Carl Liscombe led the team with 36 goals, 37 assists, and 73 points. Connie Dion and Jimmy Franks were the goaltenders.
- 1943–44 Michigan Wolverines men's ice hockey team – The Wolverines compiled a 5–3 record under head coach Ed Lowrey.

=== Other ===
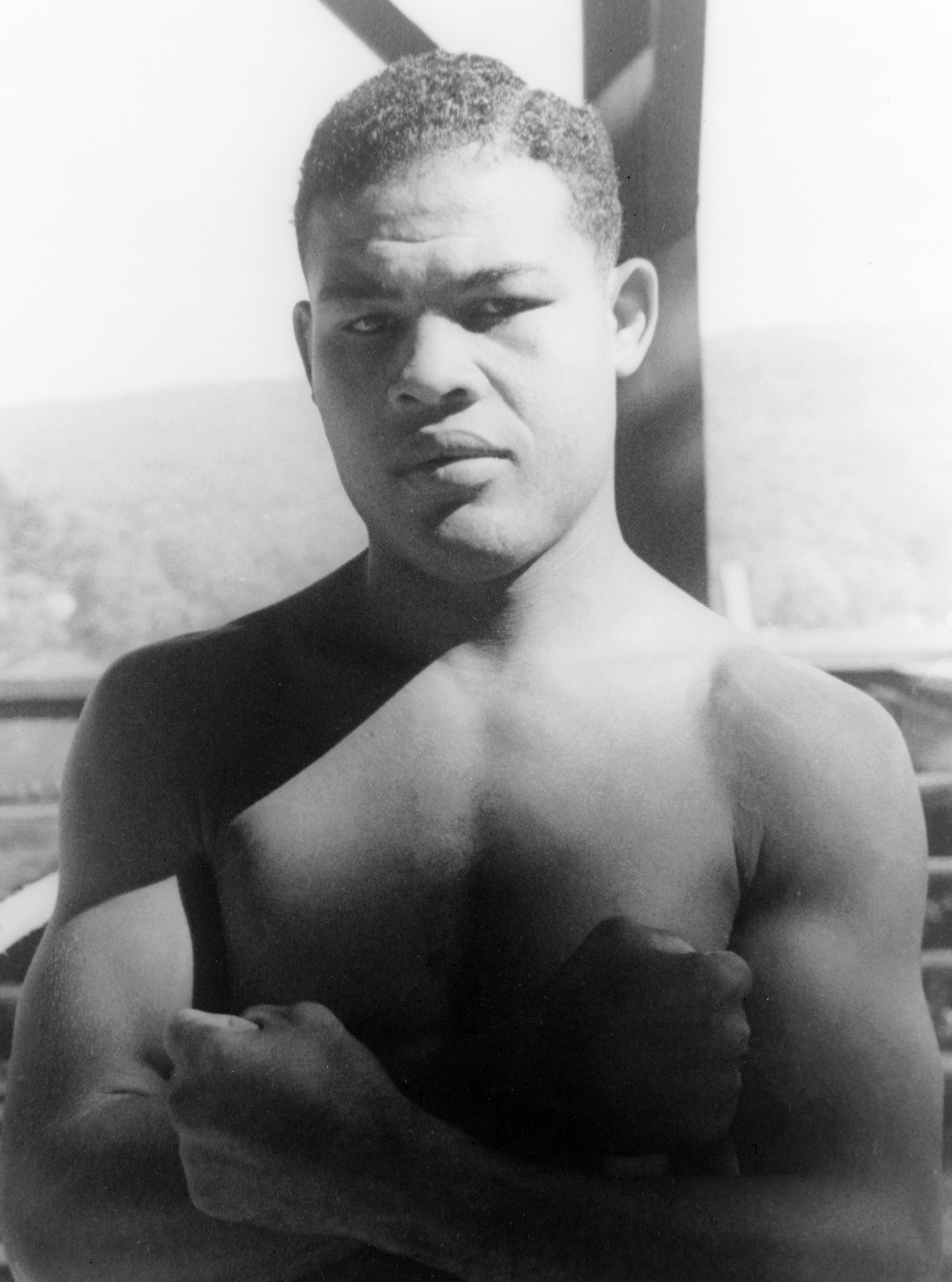
Joe Louis

- Joe Louis - On November 14, in his first fight since 1942, Detroit's Joe Louis defeated Johnny Davis by a knockout after 53 seconds of the first round before 7,107 spectators at Memorial Auditorium in Buffalo, New York. Louis fought while on a 21-day furlough from his Army service.
- Michigan Open - Sam Byrd won the tournament at Orchard Lake on August 6.
- Port Huron to Mackinac Boat Race – On July 15, the Manitour, a 64-foot yawl skippered by James H. Grove, crossed the finish line first with an elapsed time of 43:08.18. The sloop Vitesse II won the racing-cruiser division.

== Births ==
- January 13 – Larry Jaster, Major League Baseball pitcher (1965–1972), in Midland, Michigan
- January 16 – Katherine Anderson, original member of the girl group The Marvelettes, in Ann Arbor
- February 6 – Georgeanna Tillman, original member of the girl group The Marvelettes, in Inkster, Michigan
- March 26 - Diana Ross, singer, songwriter, and actress, and the lead singer of the vocal group The Supremes, in Detroit
- April 20 – John Anderson, NASCAR Winston Cup Series driver (1979–1983), in Warren, Michigan
- May 5 – Larry Brilliant, epidemiologist involved in eradicating smallpox, in Detroit
- June 8 – Ken Wilburn, professional basketball player (1966–1979), in River Rouge, Michigan
- July 12 – Denise Nicholas, actress (Room 222, In the Heat of the Night) and civil rights activist, in Detroit
- July 14 – Ike Kelley, NFL linebacker for the Philadelphia Eagles (1966–1973), in Ludington, Michigan
- July 22 – Mel Daniels, professional basketball player (1967–1976) and 2× ABA MVP (1969, 1971), in Detroit
- July 26 – Micki King, gold medalist in springboard diving at 1972 Summer Olympics, in Pontiac
- July 31 – Henry Akin, professional basketball player (1966–1969), in Detroit
- August 28 – Morry Taylor, president and CEO of Titan International, in Detroit
- September 16 – Michael McCoy, industrial designer and educator, in Eaton Rapids, Michigan
- September 18 – Terry Rakolta, anti-obscenity activist who led a 1989 boycott of Married... with Children, in Bloomfield Hills, Michigan
- September 19 – Michael Barone, conservative political analyst, pundit and journalism, in Highland Park, Michigan
- September 26 – Doug Graber, American football coach, including head coach for Rutgers (1990–1995) and Frankfurt Galaxy (2001–2003), in Detroit
- September 28 – Marcia Muller, author of fictional mystery and thriller novels (Vanishing Point), in Detroit
- November 14 – Tom McEvoy, professional poker player and member of the Poker Hall of Fame, in Grand Rapids
- December 12 – Rob Tyner, lead singer for the Detroit proto-punk band MC5 known for his rallying cry of "kick out the jams, motherfuckers" at the band's live concerts

== Deaths ==
- April 20 - Elmer Gedeon, track and baseball player at University of Michigan, at age 27, shot down in France
- December 25 - Frank Murphy, 44th Lieutenant Governor of Michigan (1941-1942), at age 47, in Detroit

== See also ==
- History of Michigan
- History of Detroit
