= 1942 in Michigan =

- Decades: 1920s; 1930s; 1940s; 1950s; 1960s
- See also: History of Michigan; Historical outline of Michigan; List of years in Michigan; 1942 in the United States

Events from the year 1942 in Michigan.

== Top stories ==
The Associated Press polled editors of its member newspapers in Michigan and ranked the state's top news stories of 1942 as follows:

1. Stephan treason trial. Max Stephan, a German-born Detroit tavernkeeper, was convicted of treason on July 2; the jury deliberated for only one hour and 23 minutes. In April 1942, Stephan harbored and fed at his tavern a German pilot who escaped from a Canadian POW camp. On August 6, Judge Arthur J. Tuttle sentenced Stephan to death by hanging. He was the first man convicted and sentenced to death on a federal treason charge since the Civil War. In July 1943, nine hours before the time set for his hanging, President Roosevelt commuted his sentence to life in prison. The Stephan story received 197 of a possible 230 points in the polling.
2. Republican election victory. In the November 3 statewide elections, Republicans won sweeping victories. In the U.S. Senate race, Republican Homer S. Ferguson narrowly defeated Democratic incumbent Prentiss M. Brown by a margin of 28,057 votes out of 1,189,966 votes cast. In the gubernatorial race, Republican Harry Kelly defeated Democratic incumbent Murray Van Wagoner. (183-1/2 points)
3. Saginaw Bay boat rescue. A 30-foot fishing boat capsized on August 2 in Saginaw Bay. After all aboard were presumed lost, several of its occupants were rescued. (112 points)
4. Train-bus collision. On October 28, a passenger train collided with a DSR bus, cutting the bus in half at the middle doors, at a grade crossing in western Hamtramck where the Grand Trunk tracks meet Caniff. The over-crowded bus carried 45 persons, of whom 16 were killed and 27 others injured. (111 points)
5. FDR visit. On September 18, President Franklin Roosevelt visited Detroit war plants, including Ford's Willow Run bomber plant in Ypsilanti and the Chrysler Tank Arsenal in Warren. (107 points)
6. Record industrial output. On December 26, the Detroit Board of Commerce reported that the city's industrial output of wartime materials and civilian goods had set a new record in 1942. The 1942 output was approximately $4 billion, nearly double the prior record of $2.1 billion set in 1937. The city also added 150,000 workers to its factory payrolls in 1942 and saw the average work week grow by 27% over the prior record year. (95 points)
7. "Home front" activities - The state's "home front" activities, including gasoline and oil rationing, civil defense, and blackouts. (62 points)
8. Oakland County murder spree. Dominic Piccone, a 21-year-old man who had been recently released from prison, killed three farmers in Concord and Oxford, Michigan, and abducted a fourth man during a 24-hour crime spree on April 1. One day later, Piccone was captured, confessed, and was sentenced to life in prison. (42 points)
9. Sojourner Truth integration - The Sojourner Truth housing project was built for African-American families in a white Polish neighborhood in Detroit. On February 28, a crowd of 1,200 whites organized to bar black families, leading to a clash between white and black groups. More than 1,100 police officers and 1,600 Michigan National Guard troops were mobilized and deployed to guard the six African-American families who moved into the housing project. Eventually, 168 black families moved into the homes. The police arrested 220 people, and 40 people were injured in the conflict. (41-1/2 points)
10. Dodge death mystery. On August 13, 1942, 43-year-old John Duval Dodge, playboy son of automotive pioneer John Francis Dodge, died from a 10-inch skull fracture after a quarrel with his wife and a violent scuffle with police. The death was ultimately ruled to have been accidental. (40 points)

Other stories receiving points included:

- A July ban on NBC radio's broadcasts of weekly concerts Interlochen national high school band after a protest by AFL Musicians Union leader, Jimmy Petrillo, that the student musicians were not members of the union. (37-1/2 points)
- Dismissal of fraud charges against Frank D. McKay (34 points)
- The August 14 crash of an Army B-24 heavy bomber at a farm in Baltimore Township, 15 miles north of Battle Creek, killing the crew of four officers and five enlisted men. (28 points)
- A July picket by 3,000 CIO union automobile workers shut down the Pontiac motor division of General Motors in order to organize a mass picketing of Oakland county food stores in a jurisdictional dispute between the CIO and AFL. The action halted war production in the Pontiac division. (27 points)
- Development of synthetic rubber by Michigan industry (22 points)
- The November 14 victory of the Michigan football team (ranked No. 6) over Notre Dame (ranked No. 4) by a 32–20 score. The Wolverines rushed for 319 yards and scored five touchdowns. Michigan's 32 points were the most allowed by a Notre Dame team since Army scored 36 points in 1916. (20 points)
- "Pontiac's car-pooling plan spreads" (16 points)
- Great Lakes freighters haul record tonnage (14 points)
- The War Labor Board, established by President Roosevelt's executive order in January 1942, settled wage disputes between unions and automobile companies. (11 points)
- On November 28, the Detroit Tigers hired Steve O'Neill as the team's manager, replacing Del Baker. (10 points)

== Office holders ==
=== State office holders ===
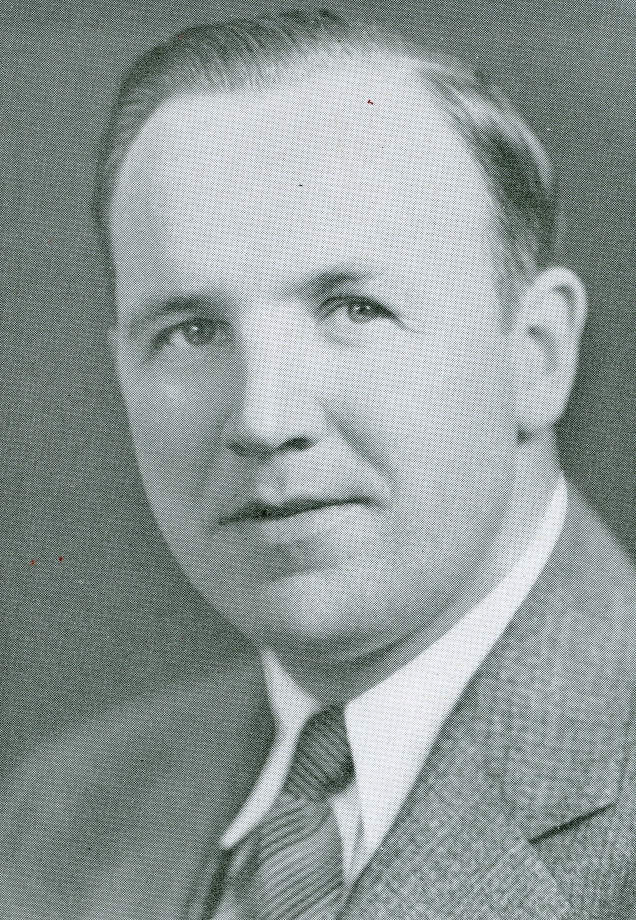
Gov. Murray Van Wagoner

- Governor of Michigan: Murray Van Wagoner (Democrat)
- Lieutenant Governor of Michigan: Frank Murphy (Democrat)
- Michigan Attorney General: Herbert J. Rushton (Republican)
- Michigan Secretary of State: Harry Kelly (Republican)
- Speaker of the Michigan House of Representatives: Howard Nugent (Republican)
- Chief Justice, Michigan Supreme Court: Bert D. Chandler

=== Mayors of major cities ===
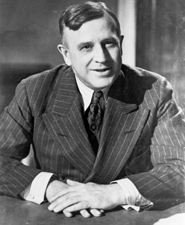
Sen. Prentiss M. Brown

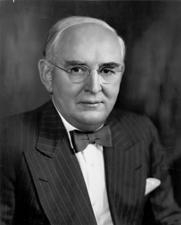
Sen. Arthur Vandenberg

- Mayor of Detroit: Edward Jeffries (Republican)
- Mayor of Grand Rapids: George W. Welsh (Republican)
- Mayor of Flint: William Osmund Kelly
- Mayor of Lansing: Sam Street Hughes
- Mayor of Dearborn: Orville L. Hubbard
- Mayor of Saginaw: William J. Brydges
- Mayor of Ann Arbor: Leigh J. Young

=== Federal office holders ===
- U.S. Senator from Michigan: Prentiss M. Brown (Democrat)
- U.S. Senator from Michigan: Arthur Vandenberg (Republican)
- House District 1: Rudolph G. Tenerowicz (Democrat)
- House District 2: Earl C. Michener (Republican)
- House District 3: Paul W. Shafer (Republican)
- House District 4: Clare Hoffman (Republican)
- House District 5: Bartel J. Jonkman (Republican)
- House District 6: William W. Blackney (Republican)
- House District 7: Jesse P. Wolcott (Republican)
- House District 8: Fred L. Crawford (Republican)
- House District 9: Albert J. Engel (Republican)
- House District 10: Roy O. Woodruff (Republican)
- House District 11: Frederick Van Ness Bradley (Republican)
- House District 12: Frank Eugene Hook (Democrat)
- House District 13: George D. O'Brien (Democrat)
- House District 14: Louis C. Rabaut (Democrat)
- House District 15: John D. Dingell Sr. (Democrat)
- House District 16: John Lesinski Sr. (Democrat)
- House District 17: George Anthony Dondero (Republican)

== Population ==
In the 1940 United States census, Michigan was recorded as having a population of 5,256,106, ranking as the seventh most populous state in the country. By 1950, Michigan's population had increased by 21.2% to 6,371,766.

=== Cities ===
The following is a list of cities in Michigan with a population of at least 20,000 based on 1940 U.S. Census data. Historic census data from 1930 and 1950 is included to reflect trends in population increases or decreases. Cities that are part of the Detroit metropolitan area are shaded in tan.

1940 Rank	City	County	1940 Pop.	1946 Est.	1950 Pop.	Change 1940-50
1	Detroit	Wayne	1,623,452	1,815,000	1,849,568	13.9%
2	Grand Rapids	Kent	164,292		176,515	7.4%
3	Flint	Genesee	151,543		163,143	7.7%
4	Saginaw	Saginaw	82,794		92,918	12.2%
5	Lansing	Ingham	78,753	90,000	92,129	17.0%
6	Pontiac	Oakland	66,626		73,681	10.6%
7	Dearborn	Wayne	63,589		94,994	49.4%
8	Kalamazoo	Kalamazoo	54,097		57,704	6.7%
9	Highland Park	Wayne	50,810		46,393	−8.7%
10	Hamtramck	Wayne	49,839	48,938	43,555	−12.6%
11	Jackson	Jackson	49,656		51,088	2.9%
12	Bay City	Bay	47,956		52,523	9.5%
13	Muskegon	Muskegon	47,697		48,429	1.5%
14	Battle Creek	Calhoun	43,453		48,666	12.0%
15	Port Huron	St. Clair	32,759		35,725	9.1%
16	Wyandotte	Wayne	30,618		36,846	20.3%
17	Ann Arbor	Washtenaw	29,815		48,251	61.8%
18	Royal Oak	Oakland	25,087		46,898	86.9%
19	Ferndale	Oakland	22,523		29,675	31.8%

=== Counties ===
The following is a list of counties in Michigan with populations of at least 75,000 based on 1940 U.S. Census data. Historic census data from 1930 and 1950 are included to reflect trends in population increases or decreases.

1940 Rank	County	Largest city	1930 Pop.	1940 Pop.	1950 Pop.	Change 1940-50
1	Wayne	Detroit	1,888,946	2,015,623	2,435,235	20.8%
2	Oakland	Pontiac	211,251	254,068	396,001	55.9%
3	Kent	Grand Rapids	240,511	246,338	288,292	17.0%
4	Genesee	Flint	211,641	227,944	270,963	18.9%
5	Ingham	Lansing	116,587	130,616	172,941	32.4%
6	Saginaw	Saginaw	120,717	130,468	153,515	17.7%
7	Macomb	Warren	77,146	107,638	184,961	71.8%
8	Kalamazoo	Kalamazoo	91,368	100,085	126,707	26.6%
9	Jackson	Jackson	92,304	93,108	108,168	16.2%
10	Muskegon	Muskegon	84,630	94,501	121,545	28.6%
11	Calhoun	Battle Creek	87,043	94,206	120,813	28.2%

== Companies ==
The following is a list of major companies based in Michigan in 1942.

Company	1942 sales (millions)	1942 net income (millions)	Headquarters	Core business
General Motors			Detroit	Automobiles
Ford Motor Company	na	na		Automobiles
Chrysler				Automobiles
Briggs Mfg. Co.			Detroit	Automobile parts supplier
S. S. Kresge				Retail
Hudson Motor Car Co.			Detroit	Automobiles
Detroit Edison				Electric utility
Michigan Bell				Telephone utility
Kellogg's			Battle Creek	Breakfast cereal
Parke-Davis			Detroit	Pharmaceutical
REO Motor Car Co.			Lansing	Automobiles
Graham-Paige				Automobiles
Burroughs Adding Machine				Business machines

== Sports ==
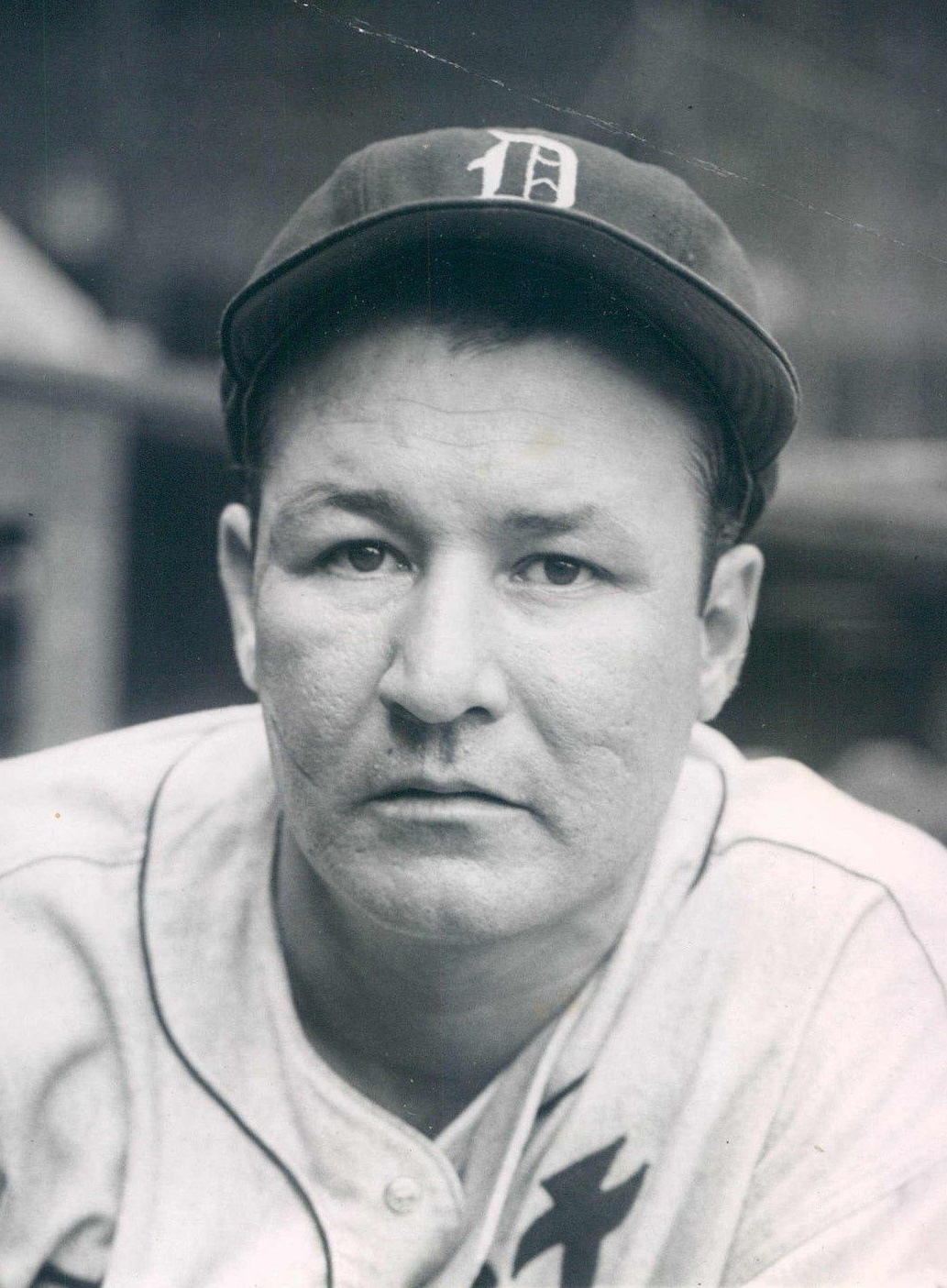
Rudy York

=== Baseball ===
- 1942 Detroit Tigers season – The Tigers compiled a 73–81 record and finished in fifth place in the American League. The team's statistical leaders included Barney McCosky with a .293 batting average, Rudy York with 21 home runs and 90 RBIs, Virgil Trucks with 14 wins, and Hal Newhouser with a 2.45 earned run average.
- 1942 Michigan Wolverines baseball season - Under head coach Ray Fisher, the Wolverines compiled a 17–9 record and tied for the Big Ten Conference championship. George Harms was the team captain.

=== American football ===
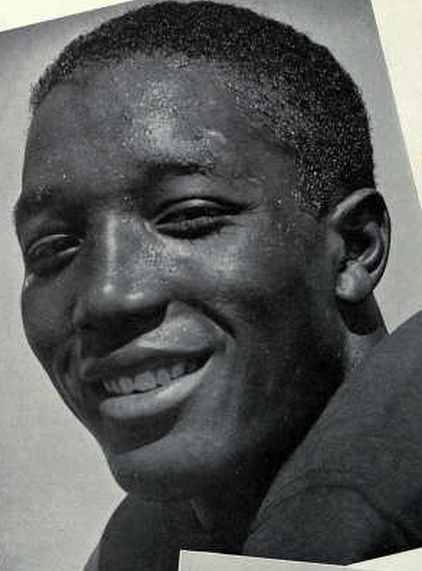
Julius Franks

- 1942 Detroit Lions season – Under head coaches Bill Edwards and Bull Karcis, the Lions compiled a 0–11 record. The team's statistical leaders included Harry Hopp with 258 passing yards, Mickey Sanzotta with 268 rushing yards, and Elmer Hackney with 12 points scored.
- 1942 Michigan Wolverines football team – Under head coach Fritz Crisler, the Wolverines compiled a 7–3 record and were ranked No. 9 in the final AP Poll. Linemen Al Wistert and Julius Franks were selected as All-Americans.
- 1942 Michigan State Spartans football team - Under head coach Charlie Bachman, the Spartans compiled a 4–3–2 record.
- 1942 Central Michigan Chippewas football team - Under head coach Ron Finch, the Chippewas compiled a 6–0 record, shut out three opponents, held five of six opponents to fewer than seven points, and outscored all opponents by a combined total of 93 to 21.
- 1942 Michigan State Normal Hurons football team - Under head coach Elton Rynearson, the Hurons compiled a 3–3–1 record and were outscored by their opponents, 81 to 64.
- 1942 Western Michigan Broncos football team - Under head coach John Gill, the Broncos compiled a 5–1 record and outscored their opponents, 66 to 37.

=== Basketball ===
- 1941–42 Michigan Wolverines men's basketball team – Under head coach Bennie Oosterbaan, the Wolverines compiled a 6–14 record. James Mandler broke Michigan's single-season scoring record with 230 points in 20 games for an average of 11.5 points per game.
- 1941–42 Michigan State Spartans men's basketball team – Under head coach Benjamin Van Alstyne, the Spartans compiled a 15-6 record.
- 1941–42 Western Michigan Broncos men's basketball team – Under head coach Buck Read, the Broncos compiled a 12-8 record.
- 1941–42 Detroit Titans men's basketball team – Under head coach Lloyd Brazil, the Titans compiled a 13-8 record.

=== Ice hockey ===
- 1941–42 Detroit Red Wings season – Under head coach Jack Adams, the Red Wings compiled a 19–25–4 record, finished fifth in the NHL, won the first two playoff rounds, and lost to the Toronto Maple Leafs in the 1942 Stanley Cup Finals. The team's statistical leaders included Don Grosso with 20 goals and 53 points and Sid Abel with 31 assists. Johnny Mowers was the goaltender.
- 1941–42 Michigan Wolverines men's ice hockey team – The team compiled a 2–14–2 record under coach Ed Lowrey.
- 1941–42 Michigan Tech Huskies men's ice hockey team – The team compiled a 3–6–3 record under coach Elwin Romnes.

== Births ==
- January 1 - Dennis Archer, Mayor of Detroit (1994-2001), in Detroit
- January 14 - Dave Campbell, Major League Baseball infielder (1967–1974), in Manistee, Michigan
- February 19 - Paul Krause, NFL defensive back (1964–1979) and Pro Football Hall of Fame inductee, in Flint
- March 16 - Roger Crozier, goaltender for Detroit Red Wings (1963-1970), in Ontario
- March 25 - Aretha Franklin, singer known as the "Queen of Soul", in Memphis
- April 11 - Jerry Hodak, television weatherman in Detroit (1965-2010), in Detroit
- July 10 - Sixto Rodriguez, singer-songwriter who was the subject of the 2012 Academy Award-winning documentary film Searching for Sugar Man, in Detroit
- July 20 - Mickey Stanley, outfielder for the Detroit Tigers (1964–1978) and 4× Gold Glove Award, in Grand Rapids, Michigan
- August 8 - James Blanchard, Governor of Michigan (1983-1991), in Detroit
- October 18 - Willie Horton, baseball player for the Detroit Tigers (1963–1977), in Virginia

== Deaths ==
- June 17 - John W. Smith, mayor of Detroit from 1924–1928 and again in 1933, at age 60 in Detroit
- December 8 - Albert Kahn, architect responsible for, among other things, the Packard Automotive Plant, Highland Park Ford Plant, Ford River Rouge Complex, Burton Memorial Tower, Fisher Building, Hill Auditorium, Hatcher Graduate Library, and William L. Clements Library, at age 73 in Detroit

== See also ==
- History of Michigan
- History of Detroit
