= 1947 in Michigan =

- Decades: 1920s; 1930s; 1940s; 1950s; 1960s
- See also: History of Michigan; Historical outline of Michigan; List of years in Michigan; 1947 in the United States

Events from the year 1947 in Michigan.

== Top stories ==
The Associated Press polled editors of its member newspapers in Michigan and ranked the state's top news stories of 1947 as follows:

1. Death of Henry Ford (227 points)
2. Judge Frank Albert Picard decision (143 points)
3. Terpenning murder (137 points)
4. Corrections department probe (134 points)
5. UAW contracts with GM, Ford, and Chrysler (129 points)
6. 1947 Michigan Wolverines football team (117 points)
7. Spring floods (103 points)
8. Budget dilemma (94 points)
9. Skillman grand jury (59 points)
10. Detroit Tigers' sale of Hank Greenberg to the Pittsburgh Pirates (51 points)

== Office holders ==
=== State office holders ===
- Governor of Michigan: Kim Sigler (Republican)
- Lieutenant Governor of Michigan: Eugene C. Keyes (Republican)
- Michigan Attorney General: Eugene F. Black (Republican)
- Michigan Secretary of State: Frederick M. Alger Jr. (Republican)
- Speaker of the Michigan House of Representatives: Victor A. Knox (Republican)
- Chief Justice, Michigan Supreme Court: Leland W. Carr

=== Mayors of major cities ===
- Mayor of Detroit: Edward Jeffries (Republican)
- Mayor of Grand Rapids: George W. Welsh (Republican)
- Mayor of Flint: Edward J. Viall
- Mayor of Dearborn: Orville L. Hubbard
- Mayor of Saginaw: Harold J. Stenglein
- Mayor of Lansing: Ralph Crego
- Mayor of Ann Arbor: William E. Brown Jr.

=== Federal office holders ===
- U.S. Senator from Michigan: Homer S. Ferguson (Republican)
- U.S. Senator from Michigan: Arthur Vandenberg (Republican)
- House District 1: George G. Sadowski (Democrat)
- House District 2: Earl C. Michener (Republican)
- House District 3: Paul W. Shafer (Republican)
- House District 4: Clare Hoffman (Republican)
- House District 5: Bartel J. Jonkman (Republican)
- House District 6: William W. Blackney (Republican)
- House District 7: Jesse P. Wolcott (Republican)
- House District 8: Fred L. Crawford (Republican)
- House District 9: Albert J. Engel (Republican)
- House District 10: Roy O. Woodruff (Republican)
- House District 11: Frederick Van Ness Bradley (Republican)
- House District 12: John B. Bennett (Republican)
- House District 13: Howard A. Coffin (Republican)
- House District 14: Harold F. Youngblood (Republican)
- House District 15: John D. Dingell Sr. (Democrat)
- House District 16: John Lesinski Sr. (Democrat)
- House District 17: George Anthony Dondero (Republican)

== Population ==
In the 1940 United States census, Michigan was recorded as having a population of 5,256,106, ranking as the seventh most populous state in the country. By 1950, Michigan's population had increased by 21.2% to 6,371,766.

=== Cities ===
The following is a list of cities in Michigan with a population of at least 20,000 based on 1940 U.S. Census data. Historic census data from 1930 and 1950 is included to reflect trends in population increases or decreases. Cities that are part of the Detroit metropolitan area are shaded in tan.

1940 Rank	City	County	1940 Pop.	1946 Est.	1950 Pop.	Change 1940-50
1	Detroit	Wayne	1,623,452	1,815,000	1,849,568	13.9%
2	Grand Rapids	Kent	164,292		176,515	7.4%
3	Flint	Genesee	151,543		163,143	7.7%
4	Saginaw	Saginaw	82,794		92,918	12.2%
5	Lansing	Ingham	78,753	90,000	92,129	17.0%
6	Pontiac	Oakland	66,626		73,681	10.6%
7	Dearborn	Wayne	63,589		94,994	49.4%
8	Kalamazoo	Kalamazoo	54,097		57,704	6.7%
9	Highland Park	Wayne	50,810		46,393	−8.7%
10	Hamtramck	Wayne	49,839	48,938	43,555	−12.6%
11	Jackson	Jackson	49,656		51,088	2.9%
12	Bay City	Bay	47,956		52,523	9.5%
13	Muskegon	Muskegon	47,697		48,429	1.5%
14	Battle Creek	Calhoun	43,453		48,666	12.0%
15	Port Huron	St. Clair	32,759		35,725	9.1%
16	Wyandotte	Wayne	30,618		36,846	20.3%
17	Ann Arbor	Washtenaw	29,815		48,251	61.8%
18	Royal Oak	Oakland	25,087		46,898	86.9%
19	Ferndale	Oakland	22,523		29,675	31.8%

=== Counties ===
The following is a list of counties in Michigan with populations of at least 75,000 based on 1940 U.S. Census data. Historic census data from 1930 and 1950 are included to reflect trends in population increases or decreases.

1940 Rank	County	Largest city	1930 Pop.	1940 Pop.	1950 Pop.	Change 1940-50
1	Wayne	Detroit	1,888,946	2,015,623	2,435,235	20.8%
2	Oakland	Pontiac	211,251	254,068	396,001	55.9%
3	Kent	Grand Rapids	240,511	246,338	288,292	17.0%
4	Genesee	Flint	211,641	227,944	270,963	18.9%
5	Ingham	Lansing	116,587	130,616	172,941	32.4%
6	Saginaw	Saginaw	120,717	130,468	153,515	17.7%
7	Macomb	Warren	77,146	107,638	184,961	71.8%
8	Kalamazoo	Kalamazoo	91,368	100,085	126,707	26.6%
9	Jackson	Jackson	92,304	93,108	108,168	16.2%
10	Muskegon	Muskegon	84,630	94,501	121,545	28.6%
11	Calhoun	Battle Creek	87,043	94,206	120,813	28.2%

== Companies ==
The following is a list of major companies based in Michigan in 1947.

Company	1947 sales (millions)	1947 net earnings (millions)	Headquarters	Core business
General Motors			Detroit	Automobiles
Ford Motor Company	na	na		Automobiles
Chrysler				Automobiles
Studebaker Corp.				Automobiles
Briggs Mfg. Co.			Detroit	Automobile parts supplier
S. S. Kresge				Retail
Hudson Motor Car Co.			Detroit	Automobiles
Detroit Edison				Electric utility
Michigan Bell				Telephone utility
Kellogg's			Battle Creek	Breakfast cereal
Parke-Davis			Detroit	Pharmaceutical
REO Motor Car Co.			Lansing	Automobiles
Burroughs Adding Machine				Business machines

== Sports ==
=== Baseball ===
- 1947 Detroit Tigers season – The Tigers compiled an 85–69 record and finished in second place in the American League. The team's statistical leaders included George Kell with a .320 batting average and 93 RBIs, Roy Cullenbine with 24 home runs, and Hal Newhouser with a 2.87 earned run average.
- 1947 Michigan Wolverines baseball season - Under head coach Ray Fisher, the Wolverines compiled an 18–10 record. Cliff Wise was the team captain.

=== American football ===
- 1947 Detroit Lions season – The Lions compiled a 3–9 record under head coach Gus Dorais. The team's statistical leaders included Clyde LeForce with 1,384 passing yards, Camp Wilson with 412 rushing yards, and John Greene with 621 receiving yards.
- 1947 Michigan Wolverines football team – Under head coach Fritz Crisler, Michigan compiled a perfect 10–0 record, won the Big Ten Conference championship, and defeated the USC Trojans by a score of 49–0 in the 1948 Rose Bowl game.
- 1947 Michigan State Spartans football team –
- 1947 Detroit Titans football team –

=== Basketball ===
- 1946–47 Michigan Wolverines men's basketball team – The team compiled a 12–8 record under head coach Osborne Cowles. Mack Supronowicz was the team's leading scorer with 228 points in 20 games for an average of 11.4 points per game. Pete Elliott was the team captain.

=== Ice hockey ===
- 1946–47 Detroit Red Wings season – Under coach Jack Adams, the Red Wings compiled a 22–27–11 record. The team's statistical leaders included Roy Conacher with 30 goals and Billy Taylor with 46 assists and 63 points.

=== Boat racing ===
- APBA Gold Cup – Danny Foster
- Harmsworth Cup –
- Port Huron to Mackinac Boat Race –

=== Golfing ===
- Michigan Open - Buck White

== Births ==
- March 12 - Mitt Romney, businessman and politician who served as Governor of Massachusetts (2003-2007) and the Republican presidential candidate (2012), in Detroit
- April 21 - Iggy Pop, singer, songwriter, musician, producer and actor, and vocalist of The Stooges, in Muskegon, Michigan
- August 5 - Bernie Carbo, Major League Baseball outfielder (1969–1980), in Detroit

== Deaths ==
- April 7 - Henry Ford, founder of Ford Motor Co., at age 83 in Dearborn

== See also ==
- History of Michigan
- History of Detroit
