= 1947 Wichita Shockers football team =

American college football season

1947 Wichita Shockers football

Raisin Bowl, L 21–35 vs. Pacific (CA)
- Conference: Missouri Valley Conference
- Record: 7–4 (2–1 MVC)
- Head coach: Ralph Graham (3rd season)
- Home stadium: Veterans Field

1947 Missouri Valley Conference football standings
	Conf.					Overall
Team	W		L		T	W		L		T
Tulsa $	3	–	0	–	0	5	–	5	–	0
Wichita	2	–	1	–	0	7	–	4	–	0
Saint Louis	1	–	1	–	0	4	–	6	–	0
Drake	1	–	3	–	0	1	–	7	–	1
Oklahoma A&M	0	–	2	–	0	3	–	7	–	0
$ – Conference champion

The 1947 Wichita Shockers football team was an American football team that represented the Municipal University of Wichita (now known as Wichita State University) as a member of the Missouri Valley Conference during the 1947 college football season. In its third and final season under head coach Ralph Graham, the team compiled a 7–4 record (2–1 against MVC opponents), finished second in the conference, lost to Pacific in the Raisin Bowl, and outscored opponents by a total of 271 to 115. The team was led on offense by halfback Linwood Sexton and fullback Anton Houlik. Sexton was one of the first African-American players in the Missouri Valley Conference.

Wichita was ranked at No. 85 (out of 500 college football teams) in the final Litkenhous Ratings for 1947.

They played their home games at Veterans Field, now known as Cessna Stadium.

== Schedule ==
Date	Opponent	Site	Result	Attendance	Source
September 20	Central Missouri State*	Veterans Field; Wichita, KS	W 33–0		
September 27	at Utah State*	Aggie Stadium; Logan, UT	L 6–21	10,000	
October 4	Bradley*	Veterans Field; Wichita, KS	W 28–7		
October 11	Drake	Veterans Field; Wichita, KS	W 21–13		
October 18	Abilene Christian*	Veterans Field; Wichita, KS	W 7–0		
October 25	Arizona State–Flagstaff*	Veterans Field; Wichita, KS	W 55–7		
November 1	at Tulsa	Skelly Stadium; Tulsa, OK	L 0–7	9,000	
November 8	at Saint Louis	Walsh Stadium; St. Louis, MO	W 38–6		
November 15	Miami (OH)*	Veterans Field; Wichita, KS	L 7–22	9,000	
November 27	Colorado College*	Veterans Field; Wichita, KS	W 62–6	7,000	
January 1, 1948	vs. Pacific (CA)*	Ratcliffe Stadium; Fresno, CA (Raisin Bowl)	L 14–26	13,000	
*Non-conference game
