= 1947 Tulsa Golden Hurricane football team =

American college football season

1947 Tulsa Golden Hurricane football

MVC champion
- Conference: Missouri Valley Conference
- Record: 5–5 (3–0 MVC)
- Head coach: Buddy Brothers (2nd season)
- Home stadium: Skelly Stadium

1947 Missouri Valley Conference football standings
	Conf.					Overall
Team	W		L		T	W		L		T
Tulsa $	3	–	0	–	0	5	–	5	–	0
Wichita	2	–	1	–	0	7	–	4	–	0
Saint Louis	1	–	1	–	0	4	–	6	–	0
Drake	1	–	3	–	0	1	–	7	–	1
Oklahoma A&M	0	–	2	–	0	3	–	7	–	0
$ – Conference champion

The 1947 Tulsa Golden Hurricane football team was an American football team represented the University of Tulsa as a member of the Missouri Valley Conference during the 1947 college football season. In its second year under head coach Buddy Brothers, the team compiled a 5–5 record (3–0 against conference opponents), won the conference championship, and outscored opponents by a total of 143 to 128.

Tulsa was ranked at No. 62 (out of 500 college football teams) in the final Litkenhous Ratings for 1947.

== Schedule ==
Date	Opponent	Site	Result	Attendance	Source
September 20	West Texas State*	Skelly Stadium; Tulsa, OK	W 26–13	7,500	
October 4	Drake	Skelly Stadium; Tulsa, OK	W 28–14	8,156	
October 11	at Texas Tech*	Tech Stadium; Lubbock, TX	L 7–14	12,500	
October 18	Georgetown*	Skelly Stadium; Tulsa, OK	L 0–12	9,616	
October 25	at Nevada*	Mackay Stadium; Reno, NV	L 13–21	8,500	
November 1	Wichita	Skelly Stadium; Tulsa, OK	W 7–0	9,000	
November 8	at Oklahoma A&M	Lewis Field; Stillwater, OK (rivalry)	W 13–0	28,500	
November 15	Baylor*^{†}	Skelly Stadium; Tulsa, OK	L 6–7	12,500	
November 22	Detroit*	Skelly Stadium; Tulsa, OK	W 30–20	9,946	
November 27	Arkansas*	Skelly Stadium; Tulsa, OK	L 13–27	22,000–23,000	
*Non-conference game; ^{†}Homecoming

== After the season ==
=== 1948 NFL draft ===
The following Golden Hurricane players were selected in the 1948 NFL draft following the season.

Round	Pick	Player	Position	NFL club
22	203	J. R. Boone	End	Chicago Bears
28	261	Don Sharp	Center	Green Bay Packers
30	282	A.B. Kitchens	Tackle	Philadelphia Eagles
