= 1947 Notre Dame Fighting Irish football team =

American college football season

1947 Notre Dame Fighting Irish football

AP Poll national champion
- Conference: Independent

Ranking
- AP: No. 1 (No. 2 in special postseason poll)
- Record: 9–0
- Head coach: Frank Leahy (5th season)
- Offensive scheme: T formation
- Captain: George Connor
- Home stadium: Notre Dame Stadium

1947 Midwestern major college football independents records
	Conf.			Overall
Team	W	L	T	W		L		T
No. 1 Notre Dame		–		9	–	0	–	0
Michigan State		–		7	–	2	–	0
Detroit		–		6	–	4	–	0
Marquette		–		4	–	5	–	0
Rankings from AP Poll

The 1947 Notre Dame Fighting Irish football team represented the University of Notre Dame during the 1947 college football season. The Irish, coached by Frank Leahy, ended the season with 9 wins and no losses, winning a share of the national championship. The 1947 team became the sixth Irish team to win a national title and the second in a row for Leahy. The squad is the second team in what is considered to be the Notre Dame Football dynasty, a stretch of games in which Notre Dame went 36–0–2 and won three national championships and two Heisman Trophies from 1946 to 1949. The 1947 team was cited by Sports Illustrated as part of the second best sports dynasty (professional or collegiate) of the 20th century and second greatest college football dynasty.

== Schedule ==
Date	Opponent	Rank	Site	Result	Attendance	Source
October 4	at Pittsburgh		Pitt Stadium; Pittsburgh, PA (rivalry)	W 40–6	64,333	
October 11	at Purdue	No. 1	Ross–Ade Stadium; West Lafayette, IN (rivalry)	W 22–7	42,000	
October 18	Nebraska	No. 2	Notre Dame Stadium; Notre Dame, IN (rivalry)	W 31–0	56,000	
October 25	Iowa	No. 2	Notre Dame Stadium; Notre Dame, IN	W 21–0	56,000	
November 1	vs. Navy	No. 1	Cleveland Stadium; Cleveland, OH (rivalry)	W 27–0	84,117	
November 8	No. 9 Army	No. 1	Notre Dame Stadium; South Bend, IN (rivalry)	W 27–7	59,171	
November 15	at Northwestern	No. 1	Dyche Stadium; Evanston, IL (rivalry)	W 26–19	48,000	
November 22	Tulane	No. 2	Notre Dame Stadium; South Bend, IN	W 59–6	57,000	
December 6	at No. 3 USC	No. 1	Los Angeles Memorial Coliseum; Los Angeles, CA (rivalry)	W 38–7	104,953	
Rankings from AP Poll released prior to the game

== Rankings ==
Ranking movements Legend: ██ Increase in ranking ██ Decrease in ranking ( ) = First-place votes
	Week									
Poll	1	2	3	4	5	6	7	8	9	Final
AP	1 (52)	2 (23)	2 (21)	1 (78)	1 (106)	1 (117)	2 (87)	1 (97)	1 (58½)	1 (107) (2 (226) in special postseason poll)

== Award winners ==
- Johnny Lujack – Heisman Trophy

All-Americans
Name	AP	UP	NEA	INS	COL	AA	SN	L	FC
† John Lujack, QB	1	1	1	1	1	1	1	1	1
George Connor, T	3	1	2		1	1	1		1
Bill Fischer, G	1	1	1	2			1	1	3
Zygmont Czarobski, T	2		1	1	2				3
Leon Hart, E							1		
† denotes unanimous selection

College Football Hall of Fame Inductees
Name	Position	Year Inducted
George Connor	Tackle	1963
Zygmont "Ziggy" Czarobski	Tackle	1977
Bill Fischer	Tackle/Guard	1983
Leon Hart	End	1973
Frank Leahy	Coach	1970
Johnny Lujack	Quarterback	1960
Jim Martin	End/Tackle	1995
Emil "Red" Sitko	Halfback/Fullback	1984

Notre Dame leads all universities in players inducted.

== The 1947 national championship dispute ==
While Notre Dame was voted national champion in the final official AP poll, Michigan went on to beat USC, 49–0, in the 1948 Rose Bowl, a greater margin that by which Notre Dame had beaten USC. Notre Dame and Michigan had traded the top spot in the polls through much of the season. Michigan took the #1 spot in the AP poll on November 16, 1947, and Notre Dame moved into the #1 spot on November 23, 1947, by a margin of 1,410 points to 1,289 points. This last regular season poll determined the recipient of the AP's national championship trophy.

Debate arose among some prominent sports writers, among them football writer Pete Rozelle" and Grantland Rice, the dean of the nation's sports writers. Rice lauded the Wolverines, saying, "It is the best all-around college football team I've seen this year..." Red Smith of the New York Herald Tribune said, "No other team that I have seen this season did things with so little effort. Crisler has so many that do so much."

Notre Dame supporters argued that the post-season AP poll was final and should not be revisited. They contended that Michigan had run up the score on USC, noted that Notre Dame had not had an opportunity to play in a bowl game, and asserted that Michigan and other Big Nine schools were unwilling to schedule Notre Dame in the regular season.

Detroit Free Press Sports Editor Lyall Smith argued the debate should be answered by comparing the two team's performance against common opponents. Smith noted: "They played three common foes. Notre Dame beat Pitt, 40–6, a margin of 34 points: Michigan beat Pitt 59–0. Notre Dame defeated Northwestern, 26 to 19, a margin of seven points: Michigan beat the 'Cats 49 to 21, for a 28-point advantage. Notre Dame dropped USC, 36 to 7, in what Coach Frank Leahy termed his team's 'greatest game of the year,' while Michigan slaughtered the same Trojans, 49 to 0. Against those three common opponents the Irish scored 104 points to 32. Michigan's margin was 167 to 21."

In response to the debate over which team truly deserved to be recognized as the nation's best, an unofficial post-bowl ballot was held, with the only two options being Michigan and Notre Dame. The AP reported on the rationale for the special poll this way: "The Associated Press is polling sports editors of its member papers throughout the country to help settle the argument as to which is the better football team -- Michigan or Notre Dame. The AP's final poll of the top ten teams, released Dec. 8 at the conclusion of the regulation season, resulted in Notre Dame winning first place with 1,410 points. Michigan was second with 1,289. . . . Returns so far received indicate that voting in this latest poll is likely to be the heaviest ever recorded." Another AP report indicated the special poll was "conducted by popular demand" to answer "the burning sports question of the day" and to do so "at the ballot box."

Michigan was voted No. 1 in the post-bowl poll by a vote of 226 to 119. The AP reported: "The nation's sports writers gave the final answer Tuesday to the raging controversy on the relative strength of the Notre Dame and Michigan football teams, and it was the Wolverines over the Irish by almost two to one—including those who saw both powerhouses perform... In the over-all total, 226 writers in 48 states and the District of Columbia picked Michigan, 119 balloted for Notre Dame, and 12 called it a draw. Opinion of the 54 writers who saw both in action last fall coincided at almost the same ratio, with 33 giving the nod to Michigan, 17 to Notre Dame, and four voting for a tie." The 357 votes cast in the post-bowl poll represented "the largest ever to take part in such an AP voting."

Commenting on the post-Rose Bowl poll, Michigan coach Fritz Crisler said "the men who voted couldn't have made a mistake if they had picked either team." He described Notre Dame coach Frank Leahy as a "superb coach." Notre Dame President, Father John Cavanagh said, "We at Notre Dame feel grateful for the magnanimous statement of Coach Crisler. I listened to Michigan against Southern California and have only praise for the skill and accomplishment of your fine team."

Despite the magnanimous statements of Coach Crisler and Father Cavanagh, the reversed decision in the post-Rose Bowl poll only stoked the debate over which team was best. Said one columnist: "Hottest argument of the moment is the one over which had the better football team, Michigan or Notre Dame. To settle it the Associated Press polled better than 350 sports writers in 48 states . . . with a two to one nod for the Wolverines."

Forty years later, the debate was still ongoing. In 1988, Michigan All-American Dan Dworsky noted: "Notre Dame still claims that national championship and so do we." The AP lists Notre Dame as the official AP title winner.
