= 1947 Marquette Hilltoppers football team =

American college football season

1947 Marquette Hilltoppers football
- Conference: Independent
- Record: 4–5
- Head coach: Frank Murray (17th season)
- Home stadium: Marquette Stadium

1947 Midwestern major college football independents records
	Conf.			Overall
Team	W	L	T	W		L		T
No. 1 Notre Dame		–		9	–	0	–	0
Michigan State		–		7	–	2	–	0
Detroit		–		6	–	4	–	0
Marquette		–		4	–	5	–	0
Rankings from AP Poll

The 1947 Marquette Hilltoppers football team was an American football team that represented Marquette University as an independent during the 1947 college football season. In its 17th season under head coach Frank Murray, the team compiled a 4–5 record and was outscored by a total of 223 to 185.

Marquette was ranked at No. 67 (out of 500 college football teams) in the final Litkenhous Ratings for 1947.

The team played its home games at Marquette Stadium in Milwaukee.

== Schedule ==
Date	Opponent	Site	Result	Attendance	Source
September 27	South Dakota	Marquette Stadium; Milwaukee, WI	W 33–6	12,000	
October 3	Saint Louis	Walsh Stadium; St. Louis, MO	W 27–23	10,486	
October 11	Detroit	Marquette Stadium; Milwaukee, WI	W 41–18	17,000	
October 18	San Francisco	Marquette Stadium; Milwaukee, WI	L 13–34	13,000	
October 25	at Wisconsin	Camp Randall Stadium; Madison, WI	L 12–35	45,000	
November 1	at Michigan State	Macklin Field; East Lansing, MI	L 7–13	23,856	
November 8	Villanova	Marquette Stadium; Milwaukee, WI	L 7–25	12,000	
November 15	at Indiana	Memorial Stadium; Bloomington, IN	L 6–48	15,000	
November 22	at Arizona	Arizona Stadium; Tucson, AZ	W 39–21	14,500	
