= 1947 Detroit Titans football team =

American college football season

1947 Detroit Titans football
- Conference: Independent
- Record: 6–4
- Head coach: Chuck Baer (3rd season)
- Captains: Bob Greiner; Joe Wright
- Home stadium: University of Detroit Stadium

1947 Midwestern major college football independents records
	Conf.			Overall
Team	W	L	T	W		L		T
No. 1 Notre Dame		–		9	–	0	–	0
Michigan State		–		7	–	2	–	0
Detroit		–		6	–	4	–	0
Marquette		–		4	–	5	–	0
Rankings from AP Poll

The 1947 Detroit Titans football team represented the University of Detroit as an independent during the 1947 college football season. Detroit outscored its opponents by a combined total of 276 to 154 and finished with a 6–4 record in its third year under head coach Chuck Baer. Bob Greiner and Joe Wright were the team captains.

Detroit was ranked at No. 48 (out of 500 college football teams) in the final Litkenhous Ratings for 1947.

== Schedule ==
Date	Opponent	Site	Result	Attendance	Source
September 19	Central Michigan	University of Detroit Stadium; Detroit, MI	W 34–14	20,450	
September 26	Oklahoma	University of Detroit Stadium; Detroit, MI	L 20–24	24,375	
October 3	Wayne	University of Detroit Stadium; Detroit, MI	W 40–7	22,153	
October 11	at Marquette	Marquette Stadium; Milwaukee, WI	L 18–41	17,000	
October 19	at Villanova	Shibe Park; Philadelphia, PA	L 12–14	15,572	
October 24	Duquesne	University of Detroit Stadium; Detroit, MI	W 38–6	17,547	
November 1	Saint Mary's	Briggs Stadium; Detroit, MI	W 19–6	20,253	
November 7	Nevada	University of Detroit Stadium; Detroit, MI	W 38–6	15,348	
November 15	Saint Louis	University of Detroit Stadium; Detroit, MI	W 37–6	5,000	
November 22	at Tulsa	Skelly Stadium; Tulsa, OK	L 20–30	9,946	

== Roster ==
1947 Detroit Titans football team roster
Players
Coaches
Offense

Pos.	#	Name	Class
OT	1	Jack Hayes	So
G	3	Charles Welch	So
HB	5	Barney Laboe	So
FB	6	Len Rittof	Jr
E	7	Edwin Jeakle	So
HB	8	Jack Lanoue	So
G	12	Bob Greiner (C)	Jr
OT	13	Pete Sullivan	Sr
C	14	Jerry Greiner	So
FB	15	Don Raymond	Fr
QB	16	Harry Peterson	So
G	17	Joe Lenc	Jr
E	18	Tim Collins	So
G	19	Joe Wandez	So
FB	20	Jim Massey	So
HB	23	John O'Leary	So
E	26	Bob Heym	So
G	27	Sal Viviano	So
HB	28	Ed Burgess	So
C	29	Jerry Mutual	So
HB	30	Wally Gruber	So
G	31	Bill Guay	So
HB	32	Bill Smith	So
HB	33	Joe Wright (C)	Jr
HB	36	Bill Haley	So
QB	37	John O'Connor	So
HB	39	John Kurkowski	Jr
HB	40	Joe LeBouf	So
QB	42	Bob O'Malley	So
E	46	Dan Boisture	So
E	47	Tom Costello	So
G	49	Nick Galante	So
G	52	Frank Bielman	So
E	53	Archie Kelly	Jr
QB	54	Gene Malinowski	Jr
C	56	John Packo	Fr
E	57	Don Byerlein	Sr
OT	58	Floyd Yeager	So
G	60	Al Ciesliga	So
C	61	Bob Solner	So
G	62	Ed Wood	So
G	63	Alex Smail	Fr
E	64	Frank Audette	So
E	65	John Cullen	So
FB	67	Mike Kaysserian	So
OT	68	Bill Welsh	So
E	69	Jim Conley	So
OT	70	Pat Kennedy	So
G	71	Jack Simmons	Sr
FB	72	Rudy Perpich	So
OT	73	Tom Finnin	So
OT	74	Al Ripple	So
OT	88	John Conti	So

Defense

Pos.	#	Name	Class

Special teams

Pos.	#	Name	Class

Head coach

- Chuck Baer

Coordinators/assistant coaches

- Lloyd Brazil (backfield)
- John Shada (line)
- Edmund J. Barbour (backfield)
- Dr. Raymond D. Forsyth (team physician and trainer)

Legend

- (C) Team captain
- (S) Suspended
- (I) Ineligible
- Injured
- Redshirt

Roster
Last update: December 21, 2017

== See also ==
- 1947 in Michigan
