= 1947 Saint Louis Billikens football team =

American college football season

1947 Saint Louis Billikens football
- Conference: Missouri Valley Conference
- Record: 4–6 (1–1 MVC)
- Head coach: Dukes Duford (8th season)
- Home stadium: Walsh Stadium

1947 Missouri Valley Conference football standings
	Conf.					Overall
Team	W		L		T	W		L		T
Tulsa $	3	–	0	–	0	5	–	5	–	0
Wichita	2	–	1	–	0	7	–	4	–	0
Saint Louis	1	–	1	–	0	4	–	6	–	0
Drake	1	–	3	–	0	1	–	7	–	1
Oklahoma A&M	0	–	2	–	0	3	–	7	–	0
$ – Conference champion

The 1947 Saint Louis Billikens football team was an American football team that represented Saint Louis University as a member of the Missouri Valley Conference during the 1947 college football season. In its eighth season under head coach Dukes Duford, the team compiled a 4–6 record (1–1 against MVC opponents), finished third in the conference, and was outscored by a total of 220 to 201.

Saint Louis was ranked at No. 99 (out of 500 college football teams) in the final Litkenhous Ratings for 1947.

The team played its home games at Walsh Stadium in St. Louis, MO.

== Schedule ==
Date	Opponent	Site	Result	Attendance	Source
September 20	at Missouri*	Memorial Stadium; Columbia, MO	L 0–19	17,000	
September 26	Missouri Mines*	Walsh Stadium; St. Louis, MO	W 61–0	10,331	
October 3	at Marquette*	Marquette Stadium; Milwaukee, WI	L 23–27	10,486	
October 10	Georgetown*	Walsh Stadium; St. Louis, MO	W 16–0	9,796	
October 18	Drake^{†}	Walsh Stadium; St. Louis, MO	W 41–12	12,312	
October 26	at St. Bonaventure*	Olean, NY	L 13–47	9,200	
November 2	Nevada*	Walsh Stadium; St. Louis, MO	L 21–27	10,136	
November 8	Wichita	Walsh Stadium; St. Louis, MO	L 6–38		
November 15	at Detroit*	University of Detroit Stadium; Detroit, MI	L 6–37	5,000	
November 27	Duquesne*	Walsh Stadium; St. Louis, MO	W 14–13	9,272	
*Non-conference game; ^{†}Homecoming
