= 1947 Oklahoma A&M Cowboys football team =

American college football season

1947 Oklahoma A&M Cowboys football
- Conference: Missouri Valley Conference
- Record: 3–7 (0–2 MVC)
- Head coach: Jim Lookabaugh (9th season)
- Home stadium: Lewis Field

1947 Missouri Valley Conference football standings
	Conf.					Overall
Team	W		L		T	W		L		T
Tulsa $	3	–	0	–	0	5	–	5	–	0
Wichita	2	–	1	–	0	7	–	4	–	0
Saint Louis	1	–	1	–	0	4	–	6	–	0
Drake	1	–	3	–	0	1	–	7	–	1
Oklahoma A&M	0	–	2	–	0	3	–	7	–	0
$ – Conference champion

The 1947 Oklahoma A&M Cowboys football team represented Oklahoma Agricultural and Mechanical College (later renamed Oklahoma State University–Stillwater) in the Missouri Valley Conference during the 1947 college football season. In their ninth year under head coach Jim Lookabaugh, the Cowboys compiled a 3-7 record (0-2 against conference opponents), finished in last place in the conference, and were outscored by opponents by a combined total of 134 to 116. The team played home games at Lewis Field in Stillwater, Oklahoma.

The team's statistical leaders included halfback Jim Spavital with 411 rushing yards and 36 points scored, Bob Cook with 188 passing yards, and Don Van Pool with 92 receiving yards. No Oklahoma A&M players received first-team All-Missouri Valley Conference honors in 1947.

Oklahoma A&M was ranked at No. 65 (out of 500 college football teams) in the final Litkenhous Ratings for 1947.

== Schedule ==
Date	Opponent	Site	Result	Attendance	Source
September 20	at Kansas State*	Memorial Stadium; Manhattan, Kansas	W 12–0	> 12,000	
September 27	at TCU*	Amon G. Carter Stadium; Fort Worth, TX	W 14–7	14,000	
October 4	at Denver*	DU Stadium; Denver, CO	L 14–26		
October 11	SMU*	Lewis Field; Stillwater, OK	L 14–21	18,000	
October 18	Georgia*	Lewis Field; Stillwater, OK	L 7–20	21,000	
October 25	at Drake	Drake Stadium; Des Moines, IA	L 9–13	6,000	
November 1	at Temple	Franklin Field; Philadelphia, PA	W 26–0	12,000	
November 8	Tulsa^{†}	Lewis Field; Stillwater, OK (rivalry)	L 0–13	28,500	
November 15	Kansas*	Lewis Field; Stillwater, OK	L 7–13	15,000	
November 29	at No. 20 Oklahoma*	Memorial Stadium; Norman, OK (Bedlam Series)	L 13–21	32,000	
*Non-conference game; ^{†}Homecoming; Rankings from AP Poll released prior to the game

== After the season ==
The 1948 NFL draft was held on December 19, 1947. The following Cowboys were selected.

Round	Pick	Player	Position	NFL team
1	11	Jim Spavital	Fullback	Chicago Cardinals
17	155	Clay Davis	Center	Chicago Cardinals
20	182	Thurman Gay	Tackle	Chicago Bears
25	234	Jim Parmer	Back	Philadelphia Eagles
