= 1947 Drake Bulldogs football team =

American college football season

1947 Drake Bulldogs football
- Conference: Missouri Valley Conference
- Record: 1–7–1 (1–3 MVC)
- Head coach: Albert Kawal (1st season)
- Home stadium: Drake Stadium

1947 Missouri Valley Conference football standings
	Conf.					Overall
Team	W		L		T	W		L		T
Tulsa $	3	–	0	–	0	5	–	5	–	0
Wichita	2	–	1	–	0	7	–	4	–	0
Saint Louis	1	–	1	–	0	4	–	6	–	0
Drake	1	–	3	–	0	1	–	7	–	1
Oklahoma A&M	0	–	2	–	0	3	–	7	–	0
$ – Conference champion

The 1947 Drake Bulldogs football team was an American football team that represented Drake University as a member of the Missouri Valley Conference during the 1947 college football season. In its first season under head coach Albert Kawal, the team compiled a 1–7–1 record (1–3 against MVC opponents), finished fourth in the conference, and was outscored by a total of 191 to 97.

In the final Litkenhous Ratings released in mid-December, Drake was ranked at No. 148 out of 500 college football teams.

The team played its home games at Drake Stadium in Des Moines, Iowa.

== Schedule ==
Date	Opponent	Site	Result	Attendance	Source
September 19	Texas Mines*	Drake Stadium; Des Moines, IA	L 7–19	9,000	
September 27	Colorado A&M*	Drake Stadium; Des Moines, IA	L 19–23	8,200	
October 4	at Tulsa	Skelly Stadium; Tulsa, OK	L 14–28	8,000	
October 11	at Wichita	Cessna Stadium; Wichita, KS	L 13–21		
October 18	at Saint Louis	Walsh Stadium; St. Louis, MO	L 12–41	12,312	
October 24	Oklahoma A&M	Drake Stadium; Des Moines, IA	W 13–9	6,000	
November 1	Iowa State Teachers*	Drake Stadium; Des Moines, IA (rivalry)	T 6–6	7,500	
November 8	Iowa State*^{†}	Drake Stadium; Des Moines, IA	L 6–36	13,000	
November 15	at New Mexico*	Zimmerman Field; Albuquerque, NM	L 7–8	7,000	
*Non-conference game; ^{†}Homecoming
