= Chuck Baer =

American football player and coach (1905–1987)

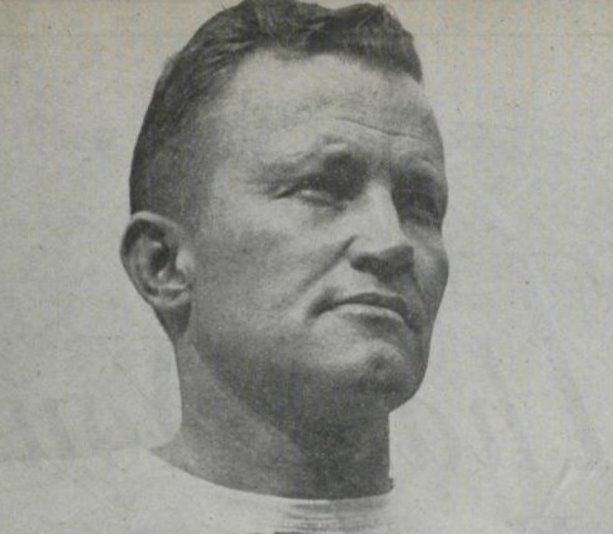

Biographical details
- Born: September 24, 1905; Montana, U.S.
- Died: May 31, 1987 (aged 81); Pontiac, Michigan, U.S.

Playing career
- 1927–1928: Illinois
- Position: Guard

Coaching career (HC unless noted)
- 1929–1930: Emerson Jr. HS (IA)
- 1931–1940: Lew Wallace HS (IA)
- 1941–1944: Illinois (assistant)
- 1945–1950: Detroit

Head coaching record
- Overall: 35–21–1 (college); 93–26 (high school)

Charles E. Baer (September 24, 1905 – May 31, 1987) was an American football coach. He served as the head football coach at the University of Detroit Mercy for six seasons, from 1945 until 1950. His coaching record at Detroit was 35–21–1. Baer is a member of the Indiana Football Hall of Fame.

Baer was captain of his high school football team in Streator, Illinois, from which he graduated in 1923. He played college football at the University of Illinois at Urbana–Champaign as a guard. The team won a Big Ten Conference title in 1927.

== Head coaching record ==
=== College ===
Year	Team	Overall	Conference	Standing	Bowl/playoffs
Detroit Titans (Independent) (1945–1948)
1945	Detroit	6–3			
1946	Detroit	6–4			
1947	Detroit	6–4			
1948	Detroit	6–3			
Detroit Titans (Missouri Valley Conference) (1949–1950)
1949	Detroit	5–4	4–0	1st	
1950	Detroit	6–3–1	2–1–1	2nd	
Detroit:		35–21–1	6–1–1		
Total:		35–21–1			
National championship Conference title Conference division title or championship game berth
