= Court-martial of William T. Colman =

1943 military trial

Col. William T. Colman in 1943

In 1943, U.S. Army colonel William Truman Colman (born October 10, 1903), commandant of the Selfridge Army Air Base, was court-martialed for shooting and wounding Private First Class William R. McRae. Colman shot McRae, an African-American driver, without provocation. He was convicted only on a reduced charge of careless use of a firearm and being drunk and disorderly, leading to protests over lenient treatment. The decision of the military court to reduce Colman's rank to captain led to protests over the leniency of the sentence. After a further review by the Secretary of War, Colman was removed from military service.

== Shooting of Private McRae ==
William T. Colman, a native of Dunkirk, New York, was the commandant of the Selfridge Army Air Base near Mount Clemens, Michigan, from April 23, 1942, to May 5, 1943. He was 39 years old at the time of his court-martial.

At a base picnic on May 4, 1943, Colman reportedly "got staggeringly drunk". At approximately 1 a.m., Coleman called for a car to drive him along with his wife from the base to their home. Colman had reportedly issued a standing order that he was "never to be sent a Negro chauffeur". Unaware of the standing order, McRae, an African-American soldier of the 44th Aviation Squadron, was dispatched to pick up Colman and announced, "Your car is ready, sir." Colman then drew his .45 caliber automatic gun and fired three shots at McRae. McRae sustained two gunshot wounds in the abdomen. Following the incident, Colman was arrested and on May 5, or May 6, 1943, relieved of his command.

== Trial ==
In September 1943, Colman was brought before a general court-martial on charges that included assault with intent to do bodily harm. Colman testified that his mind was blank and that he suffered from "a state of amnesia" for a period of five hours before and during the shooting. He contended that he was mentally ill at the time of the shooting and offered psychiatric testimony that he had been suffering from "frequent headaches, spots before the eyes, ringing in the ears, dizziness, and was mentally irresponsible."

The trial also included charges that Colman had engaged in unrelated misconduct, including arranging a transfer in exchange for use of a cottage near Oscoda, Michigan, as an "officers' club"; misappropriation of government property for use at the cottage; additional instances of drunkenness; and arranging a transfer for Benson Ford at the request of a Ford Motor executive.

Colman was convicted on a reduced charge of careless use of firearms and of being drunk and disorderly but acquitted on the more serious charges. The court reduced Colman's wartime rank of colonel to his pre-war rank of captain. In a 1961 U.S. Court of Claims case, the proceedings before the general court-martial were summarised as finding Colman guilty of "two specifications of being drunk and disorderly" (at his station at Selfridge Field), of "conduct to the prejudice of good order and military discipline", of "careless discharge of a pistol by reason of which an enlisted man was wounded" and of "being drunk and disorderly" (in his station at Oscoda Army Air Field). Following these convictions the Court of Claims found that Colman was administratively reduced to the grade of captain on September 28, 1943, and placed at the bottom of the list of permanent captains on the promotion list and to remain there for three years. Additionally, he was suspended from eligibility for any temporary promotion for that period.

== Reactions ==
The verdict and sentence issued by the court-martial was widely criticized and triggered a "storm of protest." Edgar G. Brown, director of the National Negro Council protested the lenient sentencing, calling it "equivalent to an acquittal" and an "outrageous and sorry spectacle of the miscarriage of justice." Congressman Paul W. Shafer of Michigan called the court-martial a "whitewash", a "farce trial", and "an insult to the fighting forces of the United States."

Secretary of War Henry L. Stimson ordered a review of the court-martial proceedings by a board of review. In November 1943, the Detroit Free Press reported that Colman had left the Army. The War Department then announced that Colman was "being retired". Colman told the press he would be "glad to get out of here", said he had been targeted by "pressure groups", and hoped that would be "the end of it".

In an Associated Press poll of Michigan newspaper editors, published at the end of 1943, Colman's shooting of McRae and his court-martial was ranked as the year's fourth most important news story in the state of Michigan.

== Aftermath ==
Colman later pursued legal action against the government over the negative impact of the demotion on his retirement pay. Colman's claim was sustained in part in 1961 by the Court of Claims.
