= 1947 Michigan State Spartans football team =

American college football season

1947 Michigan State Spartans football
- Conference: Independent
- Record: 7–2
- Head coach: Biggie Munn (1st season)
- MVP: Warren B. Huey
- Captain: Robert B. McCurry
- Home stadium: Macklin Field

1947 Midwestern major college football independents records
	Conf.			Overall
Team	W	L	T	W		L		T
No. 1 Notre Dame		–		9	–	0	–	0
Michigan State		–		7	–	2	–	0
Detroit		–		6	–	4	–	0
Marquette		–		4	–	5	–	0
Rankings from AP Poll

The 1947 Michigan State Spartans football team represented Michigan State College as an independent during the 1947 college football season. The team compiled a 7–2 record and outscored opponents 167 to 101. Biggie Munn was the first-year head coach, Ralph H. Young was the athletic director, and Robert McCurry was the team captain. The three assistants (Duffy Daugherty, Forest Evashevski, Kip Taylor) were all future head coaches.

In December 1946, after Charlie Bachman resigned, Michigan State hired Munn as its head football coach. Munn had been the head coach at Syracuse in 1946 and had previously been the line coach at Michigan for seven years. In their first season under Munn, the Spartans achieved their most successful since the 1937 team finished 8–2.

The Spartans began the Munn era with a 55–0 loss to in-state rival Michigan. The Spartans' only other setback was a narrow 7 to 6 loss to Bear Bryant's Kentucky Wildcats. In intersectional play, the Spartans beat Mississippi State (7–0), Washington State (21–7), Santa Clara (28–0), Temple (14–6), and Hawaii (58–19). The Hawaii game was played in Honolulu with Bud Crane scoring four touchdowns for the Spartans. The team's 58 points against Hawaii was its highest total since 1932.

Michigan State was ranked at No. 38 (out of 500 college football teams) in the final Litkenhous Ratings for 1947.

At the end of the 1947 season, Tommy Devine wrote in the Detroit Free Press that Munn had "restored athletic 'peace' to Michigan State." At the team's post-season banquet, Robert McCurry was selected to serve another year as the team's captain, and end Warren B. Huey was named the team's most valuable player and recipient of the Governor of Michigan award.

== Schedule ==
Date	Opponent	Site	Result	Attendance	Source
September 27	at Michigan	Michigan Stadium; Ann Arbor, MI (rivalry)	L 0–55	72,015	
October 4	Mississippi State	Macklin Field; East Lansing, MI	W 7–0	22,562	
October 11	at Washington State	Rogers Field; Pullman, WA	W 21–7	18,000	
October 18	Iowa State^{†}	Macklin Field; East Lansing, MI	W 20–0	20,987	
October 25	Kentucky	Macklin Field; East Lansing, MI	L 6–7	26,997	
November 1	Marquette	Macklin Field; East Lansing, MI	W 13–7	23,856	
November 8	Santa Clara	Macklin Field; East Lansing, MI	W 28–0	21,867	
November 15	at Temple	Temple Stadium; Philadelphia, PA	W 14–6	5,000	
November 29	at Hawaii	Honolulu Stadium; Honolulu, Territory of Hawaii	W 58–19	15,000	
^{†}Homecoming

== Players ==
From the 1947 team, 32 players and the student manager received varsity letters for their contributions to the team. The players who received varsity letters are:

- Don Arnson, Muskegon
- Ed Bagdon, guard, Detroit
- Ken Balge, end, Detroit
- Mark Blackman, Jackson
- Jim Blenkhorn, fullback, Saginaw
- Carl Cappaert, Clare
- Cornelius Carrigan, East Pittsburgh, PA
- Lynn Chandnois, halfback, Flint
- Bud Crane, Highland Park
- Henry Ferris, Utica, NY
- Pete Fusi, tackle, Flint
- Hal Gasser, Birmingham
- John Gilman, Clinton
- Russ Gilpin, Detroit
- Gene Glick, quarterback, Saginaw
- George Guerre, halfback, Flint
- Warren Huey, end, Punxsutawney, PA
- Bob Krestel, quarterback, Swissvale, PA
- Don Mason, guard, Wayne
- Bob McCurry, center, Lewistown, PA
- Carl Nestor, Chicago
- Rex Parsell, Flint
- John Poloncak, halfback, Chicago
- Barney Roskopp, Mt. Clemens
- Steve Sieradzki, halfback, Muskegon
- George Smith, Wayne
- Horace Smith, Jackson
- Ed Sohacki, Detroit
- Bill Spiegel, Birmingham
- Hal Vogler, tackle, Detroit
- Frank Waters, fullback, Wallingford, CT
- Jim Zito, tackle, Geneva, OH

Frank O. May of Dearborn was the student manager.

== Coaching staff ==
- Biggie Munn, head coach
- Duffy Daugherty, line
- Forest Evashevski, backfield
- Kip Taylor, ends

== Game summaries ==
=== Michigan ===
Week 1: Michigan State at Michigan

Team	1	2	3	4	Total
Mich. St.	0	0	0	0	0
• Michigan	14	14	20	7	55

- Date: September 27
- Location: Ann Arbor, Michigan
- Game attendance: 73,115
- Referee: Mike Layden

On September 27, Michigan State opened the season with a non-conference game against Michigan. Playing in Ann Arbor in front of 73,115 spectators, the Wolverines defeated the Spartans, 55–0. The game was the first as head coach of the Spartans for Biggie Munn, who had been an assistant coach at Michigan from 1938 to 1945. Michigan dominated the game, outgaining Michigan State 504 yards to 56. Michigan head coach Fritz Crisler played second, third, and fourth string players later in the game, using 37 players in all. Bob Chappuis ran for three touchdowns and threw a touchdown pass for another.
