= Herbert J. Rushton =

American lawyer and politician

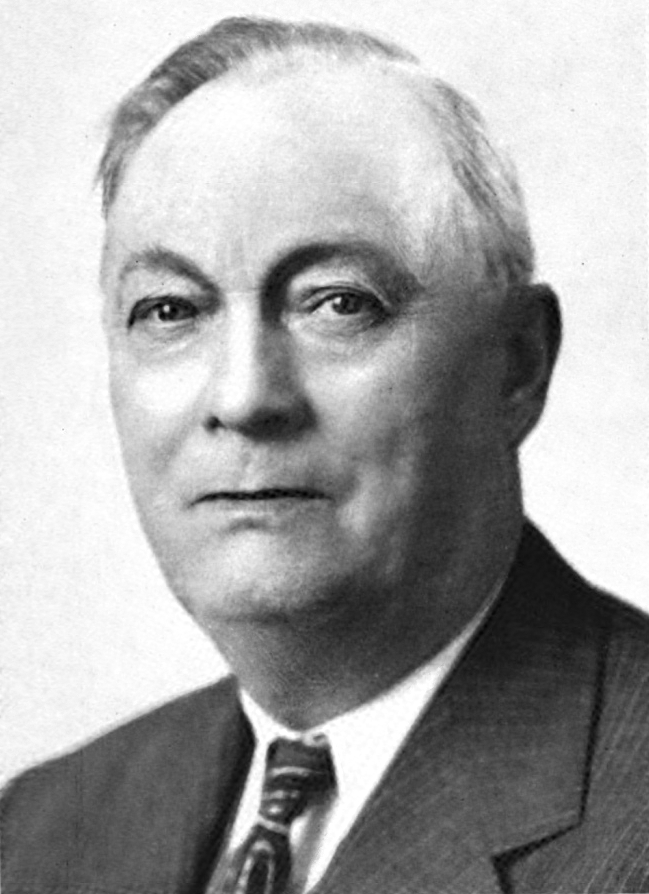

Michigan Attorney General
- In office 1941–1944
- Governor: Murray Van Wagoner; Harry Kelly
- Preceded by: Thomas Read
- Succeeded by: John R. Dethmers

Member of the Michigan Senate from the 30th district
- In office January 1, 1927 – 1932
- Preceded by: Frank P. Bohn
- Succeeded by: W. F. Doyle

Personal details
- Born: February 14, 1877 Manchester, Michigan, US
- Died: December 11, 1947 (aged 70) Escanaba, Michigan, US
- Party: Republican
- Spouse: Loretta Payne
- Children: 4
- Education: University of Michigan

Herbert J. Rushton (February 14, 1877 – December 11, 1947) was a Michigan politician.

== Early life ==
Rushton was born in Manchester, Michigan, on February 14, 1877, to parents Thomas F. and Mary Rushton. Rushton was of English and Irish descent.

== Education ==
Rushton attended high school in Napoleon, Michigan. Rushton then attended the University of Michigan. Rushton then studied law with a lawyer in Ann Arbor, Michigan. In 1905, Rushton moved to Washington due to health concerns. There, Rushton was admitted the Washington state bar in 1907. Rushton moved back to Michigan in 1908.

== Career ==
Upon returning to Michigan, Rushton practiced law, first in Menominee, then in Escanaba, Michigan. Rushton served as the Escanaba city attorney on and off for 21 years. Rushton was Delta County Prosecuting Attorney from 1913 to 1914. On November 2, 1926, Rushton was elected to the Michigan Senate where he represented the 30th district from January 5, 1927, to 1932. In 1927, Rushton drafted the bill which would create the Upper Peninsula State Fair. Rushton was a delegate to the Republican National Convention from Michigan in 1932 and in 1936. In 1936, Rushton ran unsuccessfully for the position of United States Representative from Michigan's 11th District. Rushton served as Michigan Attorney General from 1941 to 1944.

== Personal life ==
Rushton was married to Loretta Payne. Together they had four children. Rushton was a member of the Freemasons and of the Knights Templar. Rushton was Presbyterian.

== Death ==
Rushton died on December 11, 1947, in Escanaba, Michigan. He was interred at Lakeview Cemetery in Escanaba.

Legal offices
| Preceded by Thomas Read | Michigan Attorney General; 1941–1944 | Succeeded by John R. Dethmers |
