= Buck Read =

Biographical details
- Born: February 8, 1880; Saxmundham, England
- Died: August 15, 1970 (aged 90); Newport Beach, California, U.S.

Coaching career (HC unless noted)
- 1922–1949: Western State Normal/ Western State Teachers/ Western Michigan

Head coaching record
- Overall: 353–157

Herbert William "Buck" Read (February 8, 1880 - August 15, 1970) was an American basketball coach. He was the head coach for the Western Michigan Broncos men's basketball team from 1922 through 1949. He was also president of the National Association of Basketball Coaches (NABC) from 1948 to 1949 and the chairman of its rules committee in 1937, 1938, and 1944.

== Early years ==
Read was born in Saxmundham, England, in February 1880. He immigrated to the United States in April 1880 at age two months.

Read was the athletic director at Kalamazoo High School until he resigned in 1908.

== Western Michigan ==
Read worked for many years on the coaching staff of Western State Normal School in Kalamazoo, Michigan. He became the school's second head basketball coach in 1922, replacing William H. Spaulding who served as basketball coach from 1913 to 1922. Read remained as the head basketball coach at Western State until 1949.

Read has been credited with introducing the fast break to basketball during the 1929-1930 season. (Others credit Frank Keaney with the innovation.) He later recalled that the slow pace of the game made it difficult to attract fans when he learned of the popularity of the fast-paced game of hockey in Detroit. "I made revisions in drills for faster ball handling and footwork. Then I changed from the zone defense to an advancing, interchanging, intercepting pattern of playing all over the floor. It was hard for the players to switch, but the new style was effective and popular from the start." In the team's first year using the fast break approach, Read's team compiled a perfect 17-0 record.

Read also served for many years as an official of the National Association of Basketball Coaches (NABC). He was elected president in March 1948 and serve in that position until March 1949. He previously served for many years as a member of the NABC rules committee. He was chairman of the rules committee in 1937, 1938, and 1944, chairman of the research committee in 1943, and at other times secretary-treasurer and vice president.

Read retired in 1949 with a 353–157 record (.692) in 28 seasons as head basketball coach at Western Michigan. He received numerous honors for his contributions to the sport of basketball and athletics at Western Michigan. These include the following:

- In June 1963, he was inducted into the Helms Athletic Foundation's basketball hall of fame.
- In September 1963, the fieldhouse at Western Michigan University was named Read Fieldhouse in his honor. Read was honored at a dedication ceremony in December 1963.
- In 1980, he was inducted into the Western Michigan Athletic Hall of Fame in 1980.

== Family and death ==
Read and his wife, Gertrude, had a daughter, Mary, born in 1926.

Read died in 1970 at age 90 in Newport Beach, California.

== Head coaching record ==
Record table
Season	Team	Overall	Conference	Standing	Postseason
Western State Normal Hilltoppers / Western State Teachers Hilltoppers / Western State Broncos / Western Michigan Broncos (Independent) (1922–1947)
1922–23	Western State Normal	17–6			
1923–24	Western State Normal	13–8			
1924–25	Western State Normal	17–4			
1925–26	Western State Normal	15–4			
1926–27	Western State Teachers	16–2			
1927–28	Western State Teachers	9–8			
1928–29	Western State Teachers	10–9			
1929–30	Western State Teachers	17–0			
1930–31	Western State Teachers	14–3			
1931–32	Western State Teachers	14–5			
1932–33	Western State Teachers	14–3			
1933–34	Western State Teachers	12–5			
1934–35	Western State Teachers	11–5			
1935–36	Western State Teachers	15–3			
1936–37	Western State Teachers	13–4			
1937–38	Western State Teachers	6–12			
1938–39	Western State Teachers	7–10			
1939–40	Western State Teachers	10–9			
1940–41	Western State Teachers	9–9			
1941–42	Western Michigan	12–8			
1942–43	Western Michigan	15–4			
1943–44	Western Michigan	15–4			
1944–45	Western Michigan	8–10			
1945–46	Western Michigan	15–7			
1946–47	Western Michigan	17–7			
Western Michigan Broncos (Mid-American Conference) (1947–1949)
1947–48	Western Michigan	12–10	1–2	5th	
1948–49	Western Michigan	12–10	4–6	T–3rd	
Western State / Western Michigan:		345–169	5–8		
Total:		345–169			
