= Howard Nugent =

American politician

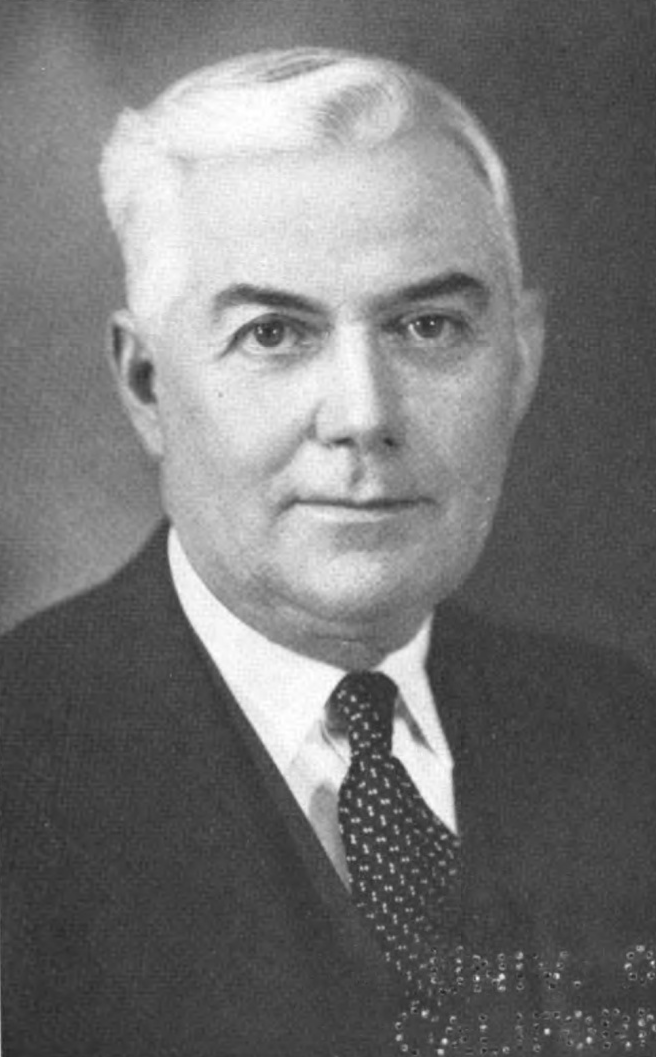

52nd Speaker of the Michigan House of Representatives
- In office January 4, 1939 – July 26, 1946
- Preceded by: George A. Schroeder
- Succeeded by: Victor A. Knox

Member of the Michigan House of Representatives from the Huron County district
- In office January 1, 1951 – May 29, 1952
- Preceded by: G. Kirk Haley
- Succeeded by: George Dunn
- In office January 1, 1935 – December 31, 1946
- Preceded by: Elmer B. McDonald
- Succeeded by: G. Kirk Haley

Personal details
- Born: August 22, 1879 Bad Axe, Michigan
- Died: May 29, 1952 (aged 72) Bad Axe, Michigan
- Party: Republican
- Spouse: Alice
- Occupation: Farmer

Howard Nugent (1879-1952) was a US Republican politician from Michigan who served in the Michigan House of Representatives and was the longest-tenured Speaker in its history. Nugent was a candidate for Lieutenant Governor of Michigan in 1946, losing in the Republican primary to Eugene C. Keyes.

Nugent died on May 29, 1952, as a result of heart disease from which he was believed to be recovering.

== See also ==
- List of Michigan state legislatures
