= Leigh J. Young =

American politician

Mayor of Ann Arbor
- In office 1941–1945
- Preceded by: Walter C. Sadler
- Succeeded by: William E. Brown Jr.

Personal details
- Born: March 31, 1883 Albia, Iowa, US
- Died: December 24, 1960 (aged 77) Ann Arbor, Michigan, US
- Party: Republican

Leigh Jarvis Young (March 31, 1883 – December 24, 1960) was a Michigan politician.

== Early life ==
Young was born on March 31, 1883, in Albia, Iowa, to parents David Whitcomb and Mary Young.

== Career ==
Young worked as an associate professor of forestry for the University of Michigan from 1911 to 1920. Young served as the mayor of Ann Arbor, Michigan from 1941 to 1945.

== Personal life ==
Young married Frances Speed Graham in 1912.

== Death ==
Young died of heart disease in the Saint Joseph Mercy Hospital in Ann Arbor, Michigan, on December 24, 1960. Young was cremated.
