= Bartel J. Jonkman =

American politician (1884-1955)

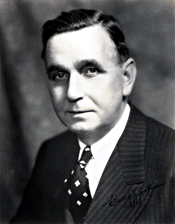

Member of the U.S. House of Representatives from Michigan's 5th district
- In office February 19, 1940 – January 3, 1949
- Preceded by: Carl Mapes
- Succeeded by: Gerald Ford

Personal details
- Born: April 28, 1884 Grand Rapids, Michigan, U.S.
- Died: June 13, 1955 (aged 71) Grand Rapids, Michigan, U.S.
- Party: Republican
- Education: University of Michigan Law School

Bartel John Jonkman (April 28, 1884 – June 13, 1955) was a politician from the U.S. state of Michigan.

Jonkman was born in Grand Rapids, Michigan, where he attended the public schools. He was of Dutch descent. He graduated from the law department of the University of Michigan in 1914, was admitted to the bar the same year, and commenced practice in Grand Rapids. He served as assistant prosecutor of Kent County from 1915 to 1920, and as prosecuting attorney from 1929 to 1936.

Following the death of U.S. Representative Carl E. Mapes, in December 1939, a special election was held on February 19, 1940, to fill the vacancy. Jonkman was elected as a Republican from Michigan's 5th congressional district to the 76th United States Congress, serving from February 19, 1940, to January 3, 1949. In the 1948 Republican primary, he was defeated for re-nomination by Gerald Ford, then 34 years old, who eventually served as the 38th President of the United States from 1974 to 1977.

A confidential 1943 analysis of the House Foreign Affairs Committee by Isaiah Berlin for the British Foreign Office described Jonkman as

the fourth of the Republican Opposition group on the committee. An agreeable man, shrewd, capable and very determined in his opposition to the Administration in both its foreign and domestic policies. Pure Isolationist before Pearl Harbor, and, in fact, typical of the Michigan Republican Bloc (whose most notorious member is Clare Hoffman). Seems convinced America is playing Santa Claus again in this war, and is doing his best to obtain facts and figures which will show up this fact. A Methodist; age 59. Nationalist.

Bartel J. Jonkman had become unpopular largely due to his isolationist position on foreign policy. He resumed the practice of law and died in Grand Rapids. He was interred there in Woodlawn Cemetery.

U.S. House of Representatives
Preceded by Carl E. Mapes	United States Representative for the 5th congressional district of Michigan; February 19, 1940 – January 3, 1949	Succeeded by Gerald Ford
