= 1937 in Michigan =

- Decades: 1910s; 1920s; 1930s; 1940s; 1950s
- See also: History of Michigan; Historical outline of Michigan; List of years in Michigan; 1937 in the United States

Events from the year 1937 in Michigan.

== Office holders ==
=== State office holders ===
- Governor of Michigan: Frank Murphy (Democrat)
- Lieutenant Governor of Michigan: Thomas Read (Republican)/Leo J. Nowicki (Democrat)
- Michigan Attorney General: Raymond Wesley Starr
- Michigan Secretary of State: Leon D. Case (Democrat)
- Speaker of the Michigan House of Representatives: George A. Schroeder (Democrat)
- Chief Justice, Michigan Supreme Court: Louis H. Fead

=== Mayors of major cities ===
- Mayor of Detroit: Frank Couzens (Republican)
- Mayor of Grand Rapids: Tunis Johnson
- Mayor of Flint: Harold E. Bradshaw
- Mayor of Dearborn: John Carey
- Mayor of Saginaw: Frank Marxer/Francis J. McDonald
- Mayor of Lansing: Max A. Templeton
- Mayor of Ann Arbor: Robert A. Campbell/Walter C. Sadler

=== Federal office holders ===
- U.S. Senator from Michigan: Prentiss M. Brown (Democrat)
- U.S. Senator from Michigan: Arthur Vandenberg (Republican)
- House District 1: George G. Sadowski (Democrat)
- House District 2: Earl C. Michener (Republican)
- House District 3: Paul W. Shafer (Republican)
- House District 4: Clare Hoffman (Republican)
- House District 5: Carl E. Mapes (Republican)
- House District 6: Andrew J. Transue (Democrat)
- House District 7: Jesse P. Wolcott (Republican)
- House District 8: Fred L. Crawford (Republican)
- House District 9: Albert J. Engel (Republican)
- House District 10: Roy O. Woodruff (Republican)
- House District 11: John F. Luecke (Democrat)
- House District 12: Frank Eugene Hook (Democrat)
- House District 13: George D. O'Brien (Republican)
- House District 14: Louis C. Rabaut (Democrat)
- House District 15: John D. Dingell Sr. (Democrat)
- House District 16: John Lesinski Sr. (Democrat)
- House District 17: George Anthony Dondero (Republican)

== Population ==
In the 1930 United States census, Michigan was recorded as having a population of 4,842,325, ranking as the seventh most populous state in the country. By 1940, Michigan's population had increased by 8.5% to 5,256,106.

=== Cities ===
The following is a list of cities in Michigan with a population of at least 20,000 based on 1930 U.S. Census data. Historic census data from 1920 and 1940 is included to reflect trends in population increases or decreases. Cities that are part of the Detroit metropolitan area are shaded in tan.

1930 Rank	City	County	1920 Pop.	1930 Pop.	1940 Pop.	Change 1930-40
1	Detroit	Wayne	993,678	1,568,662	1,623,452	3.5%
2	Grand Rapids	Kent	137,634	168,592	164,292	−2.6%
3	Flint	Genesee	91,599	156,492	151,543	−3.2%
4	Saginaw	Saginaw	61,903	80,715	82,794	2.6%
5	Lansing	Ingham	57,327	78,397	78,753	0.5%
6	Pontiac	Oakland	34,273	64,928	66,626	2.6%
7	Hamtramck	Wayne	48,615	56,268	49,839	−11.4%
8	Jackson	Jackson	48,374	55,187	49,656	−10.0%
9	Kalamazoo	Kalamazoo	48,487	54,786	54,097	−1.3%
10	Highland Park	Wayne	46,499	52,959	50,810	−4.1%
11	Dearborn	Wayne	2,470	50,358	63,589	26.3%
12	Bay City	Bay	47,554	47,355	47,956	1.3%
13	Battle Creek	Calhoun	36,164	45,573	43,453	−4.7%
14	Muskegon	Muskegon	36,570	41,390	47,697	15.2%
15	Port Huron	St. Clair	25,944	31,361	32,759	4.5%
16	Wyandotte	Wayne	13,851	28,368	30,618	7.9%
17	Ann Arbor	Washtenaw	19,516	26,944	29,815	10.7%
18	Royal Oak	Oakland	6,007	22,904	25,087	9.5%
19	Ferndale	Oakland	2,640	20,855	22,523	8.0%

=== Counties ===
The following is a list of counties in Michigan with populations of at least 50,000 based on 1930 U.S. Census data. Historic census data from 1920 and 1940 are included to reflect trends in population increases or decreases.

1930 Rank	County	Largest city	1920 Pop.	1930 Pop.	1940 Pop.	Change 1930-40
1	Wayne	Detroit	1,177,645	1,888,946	2,015,623	6.7%
2	Kent	Grand Rapids	183,041	240,511	246,338	2.4%
3	Genesee	Flint	125,668	211,641	227,944	7.7%
4	Oakland	Pontiac	90,050	211,251	254,068	20.3%
5	Saginaw	Saginaw	100,286	120,717	130,468	8.1%
6	Ingham	Lansing	81,554	116,587	130,616	12.0%
7	Jackson	Jackson	72,539	92,304	93,108	0.9%
8	Kalamazoo	Kalamazoo	71,225	91,368	100,085	9.5%
9	Calhoun	Battle Creek	72,918	87,043	94,206	8.2%
10	Muskegon	Muskegon	62,362	84,630	94,501	11.7%
11	Berrien	Benton Harbor	62,653	81,066	89,117	9.9%
12	Macomb	Warren	38,103	77,146	107,638	39.5%
13	Bay	Bay City	69,548	69,474	74,981	7.9%
14	St. Clair	Port Huron	58,009	67,563	76,222	12.8%
15	Washtenaw	Ann Arbor	49,520	65,530	80,810	23.3%
16	Ottawa	Holland	47,660	54,858	59,660	8.8%
17	Houghton	Houghton	71,930	52,851	47,631	−9.9%
18	Monroe	Monroe	37,115	52,485	58,620	11.7%
19	Lenawee	Adrian	47,767	49,849	53,110	6.5%

== Sports ==
=== Baseball ===
- 1937 Detroit Tigers season – Under player-manager Mickey Cochrane, the Tigers compiled an 89-65 record and finished in second place in the American League. Second baseman Charlie Gehringer led the league with a .371 batting average and was selected as the American League Most Valuable Player (MVP). First baseman Hank Greenberg led the league with 184 RBIs and 104 extra base hits and finished third in the MVP voting. Four Tigers ranked among the league's top 10 in batting average: Gehringer (.371), Greenberg (.337), Gee Walker (.335), and Pete Fox (.331). Roxie Lawson led the pitching staff with 18 wins, and Elden Auker led with a 3.88 earned run average.
- 1937 Michigan Wolverines baseball season - Under head coach Ray Fisher, the Wolverines compiled a 16–9 record. Lyle Williams was the team captain.

=== American football ===
- 1937 Detroit Lions season – Under head coach Potsy Clark, the Lions compiled a 7–4 record and placed second in the NFL's Western Division. The team's statistical leaders included Bill Shepherd with 297 passing yards, Dutch Clark with 468 rushing yards and 45 points scored, and Ed Klewicki with 134 receiving yards.
- 1937 Michigan Wolverines football team – The Wolverines compiled a 4–4 record under head coach Harry Kipke.
- 1937 Michigan State Spartans football team – Under head coach Charlie Bachman, the Spartans compiled an 8–2 record and lost to Auburn in the 1938 Orange Bowl.
- 1937 Detroit Titans football team – The Titans compiled a 7–3 record under head coach Gus Dorais.
- 1937 Wayne Tartars football team – The Tartars compiled a 6–2 record under head coach Joe Gembis.
- 1937 Central Michigan Bearcats football team - Under head coach Ron Finch the Bercats compiled a 6–2 record.
- 1937 Western State Hilltoppers football team - Under head coach Mike Gary, the Hilltoppers compiled a 5–3 record.
- 1937 Michigan State Normal Hurons football team - Under head coach Elton Rynearson, the Hurons compiled a 5–2–1 record.

=== Basketball ===
- 1936–37 Western Michigan Broncos men's basketball team – Under head coach Buck Read, the Broncos compiled a 13–4 record.
- 1936–37 Detroit Titans men's basketball team – Under head coach Lloyd Brazil, the Titans compiled an 11–5 record.
- 1936–37 Michigan Wolverines men's basketball team – Under head coach Franklin Cappon, the Wolverines compiled a 16–4 record. Johnny Gee was the team captain, and John "Jake" Townsend was the team's high scorer with 191 points.
- 1936–37 Michigan State Spartans men's basketball team – Under head coach Benjamin Van Alstyne, the Spartans compiled a 5–12 record.
- 1936–37 Wayne Tartars men's basketball team – Under coach Newman Ertell, Wayne compiled a 13–4 record.

=== Ice hockey ===
- 1936–37 Detroit Red Wings season – Under coach Jack Adams, the Red Wings compiled a 25–14–9 record, finished in first place in the National Hockey League (NHL) American Division, and defeated the New York Rangers in the 1937 Stanley Cup Finals. The team's statistical leaders included Larry Aurie with 23 goals and Marty Barry with 27 assists 44 points and Herbie Lewis with 23 assists. Normie Smith was the team's goaltender.
- 1936–37 Michigan Wolverines men's ice hockey team – Under head coach Ed Lowrey, the Wolverines compiled an 11–6–1 record.
- 1936–37 Michigan Tech Huskies men's ice hockey team – Under head coach Bert Noblet, the Huskies compiled a 7–8–3 record.

=== Other ===
- Port Huron to Mackinac Boat Race –
- Michigan Open -
- APBA Gold Cup –

== Births ==
- March 6 - Ivan Boesky, stock trader known for role in insider trading scandal in the mid-1980s, in Detroit
- March 25 - Tom Monaghan, founder and owner of Domino's Pizza (1959-1998), owner of Detroit Tigers (1983-1992), in Ann Arbor, Michigan
- April 2 - Dick Radatz, Major League Baseball pitcher (1962–1969), in Detroit
- April 6 - Phil Regan, Major League Baseball pitcher (1960–1972), known as "The Vulture", in Otsego, Michigan
- April 14 - Paul Kangas, co-anchor of PBS' Nightly Business Report (1979-2009), in Houghton, Michigan
- April 16 - George Steele, professional wrestler and actor (Ed Wood, in Detroit
- May 4 - Ron Carter, jazz double bassist, member of the Miles Davis Quintet in the early 1960s, the most recorded bassist in history, in Ferndale, Michigan
- August 5 - Gordon Johncock, racing driver, 2× winner of the Indianapolis 500, in Hastings, Michigan
- August 27 - Alice Coltrane, jazz pianist, organist, harpist, singer, composer, swamini, and second wife of John Coltrane, in Detroit
- August 29 - Chuck Shonta AFL cornerback (1960–1967), in Detroit

== Deaths ==
- January 20 - Michael Gallagher, Archbishop of Detroit (1918-1937), at age 70 in Detroit
- March 7 - Lady Baldwin, Major League Baseball pitcher (1884-1890) who won 42 games for the Detroit Wolverines in 1886, at age 77 in Hastings, Michigan
- April 14 - Ned Hanlon, member of Baseball Hall of Fame who played for Detroit Wolverines (1881-1888), in Baltimore
- April 25 - Clem Sohn, air show daredevil, at age 26 in France
- July 2- Joe Yeager, Major League Baseball player (1898-1908) who led the Detroit Tigers with a 2.61 ERA in 1901, in Detroit

== See also ==
- History of Michigan
- History of Detroit
