= 1939 in Michigan =

- Decades: 1910s; 1920s; 1930s; 1940s; 1950s
- See also: History of Michigan; Historical outline of Michigan; List of years in Michigan; 1939 in the United States

Events from the year 1939 in Michigan.

== Office holders ==
=== State office holders ===
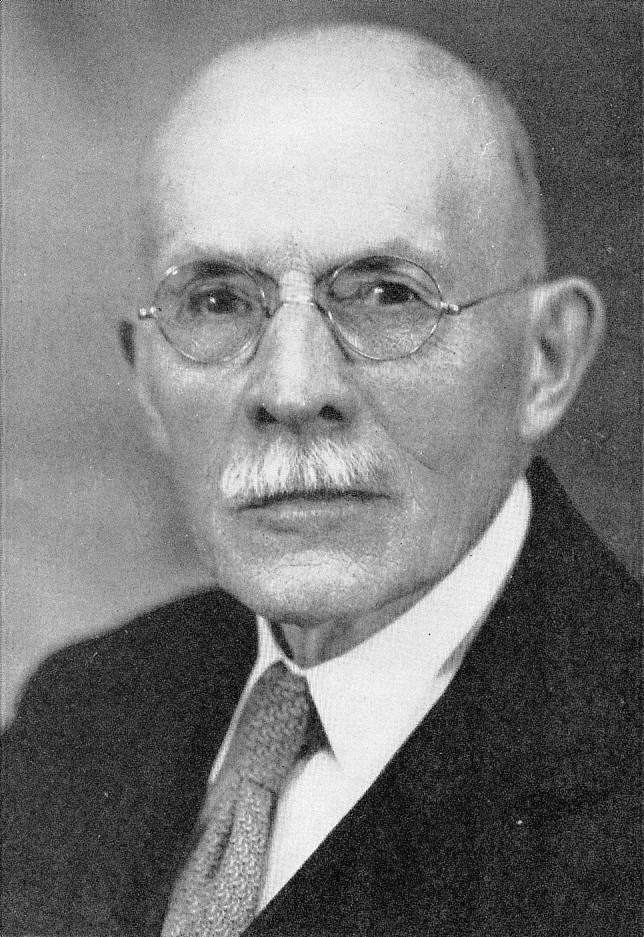
Gov. Luren Dickinson

- Governor of Michigan: Frank Fitzgerald (Republican)/Luren Dickinson (Republican)
- Lieutenant Governor of Michigan: Luren D. Dickinson (Republican)
- Michigan Attorney General: Thomas Read (Republican)
- Michigan Secretary of State: Harry Kelly (Republican)
- Speaker of the Michigan House of Representatives: Howard Nugent (Republican)
- Chief Justice, Michigan Supreme Court: Henry M. Butzel

=== Mayors of major cities ===
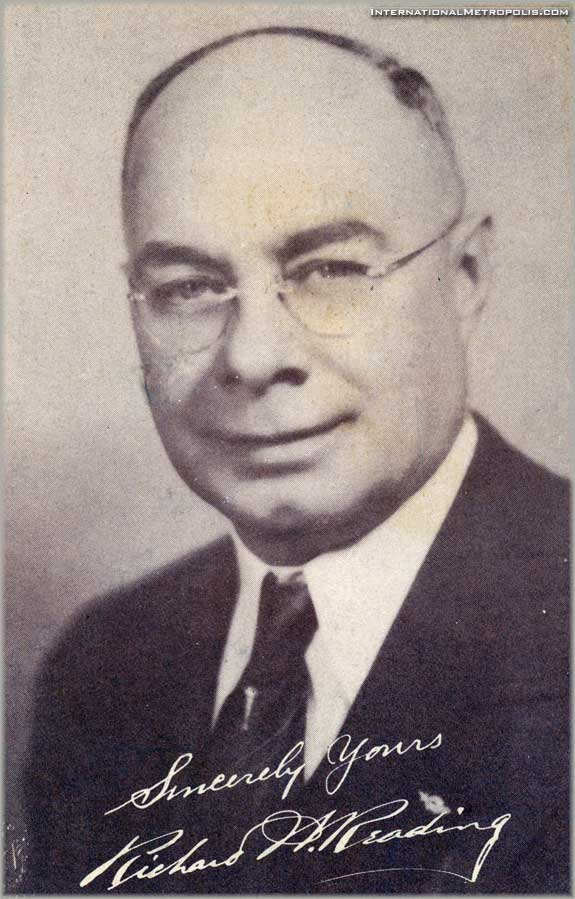
Mayor Richard Reading

- Mayor of Detroit: Richard Reading (Republican)
- Mayor of Grand Rapids: George W. Welsh
- Mayor of Flint: Harry M. Comins
- Mayor of Dearborn: John Carey
- Mayor of Saginaw: Francis J. McDonald/John W. Symons Jr.
- Mayor of Lansing: Max A. Templeton
- Mayor of Ann Arbor: Walter C. Sadler

=== Federal office holders ===
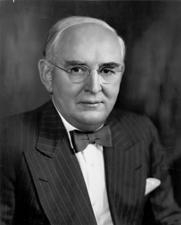
Sen. Arthur Vandenberg

- U.S. Senator from Michigan: Prentiss M. Brown (Democrat)
- U.S. Senator from Michigan: Arthur Vandenberg (Republican)
- House District 1: Rudolph G. Tenerowicz (Democrat)
- House District 2: Earl C. Michener (Republican)
- House District 3: Paul W. Shafer (Republican)
- House District 4: Clare Hoffman (Republican)
- House District 5: Bartel J. Jonkman (Republican)
- House District 6: William W. Blackney (Republican)
- House District 7: Jesse P. Wolcott (Republican)
- House District 8: Fred L. Crawford (Republican)
- House District 9: Albert J. Engel (Republican)
- House District 10: Roy O. Woodruff (Republican)
- House District 11: Frederick Van Ness Bradley (Republican)
- House District 12: Frank Eugene Hook (Democrat)
- House District 13: Clarence J. McLeod (Republican)
- House District 14: Louis C. Rabaut (Democrat)
- House District 15: John D. Dingell Sr. (Democrat)
- House District 16: John Lesinski Sr. (Democrat)
- House District 17: George Anthony Dondero (Republican)

== Population ==
In the 1930 United States census, Michigan was recorded as having a population of 4,842,325, ranking as the seventh most populous state in the country. By 1940, Michigan's population had increased by 8.5% to 5,256,106.

=== Cities ===
The following is a list of cities in Michigan with a population of at least 20,000 based on 1930 U.S. Census data. Historic census data from 1920 and 1940 is included to reflect trends in population increases or decreases. Cities that are part of the Detroit metropolitan area are shaded in tan.

1930 Rank	City	County	1920 Pop.	1930 Pop.	1940 Pop.	Change 1930-40
1	Detroit	Wayne	993,678	1,568,662	1,623,452	3.5%
2	Grand Rapids	Kent	137,634	168,592	164,292	−2.6%
3	Flint	Genesee	91,599	156,492	151,543	−3.2%
4	Saginaw	Saginaw	61,903	80,715	82,794	2.6%
5	Lansing	Ingham	57,327	78,397	78,753	0.5%
6	Pontiac	Oakland	34,273	64,928	66,626	2.6%
7	Hamtramck	Wayne	48,615	56,268	49,839	−11.4%
8	Jackson	Jackson	48,374	55,187	49,656	−10.0%
9	Kalamazoo	Kalamazoo	48,487	54,786	54,097	−1.3%
10	Highland Park	Wayne	46,499	52,959	50,810	−4.1%
11	Dearborn	Wayne	2,470	50,358	63,589	26.3%
12	Bay City	Bay	47,554	47,355	47,956	1.3%
13	Battle Creek	Calhoun	36,164	45,573	43,453	−4.7%
14	Muskegon	Muskegon	36,570	41,390	47,697	15.2%
15	Port Huron	St. Clair	25,944	31,361	32,759	4.5%
16	Wyandotte	Wayne	13,851	28,368	30,618	7.9%
17	Ann Arbor	Washtenaw	19,516	26,944	29,815	10.7%
18	Royal Oak	Oakland	6,007	22,904	25,087	9.5%
19	Ferndale	Oakland	2,640	20,855	22,523	8.0%

=== Counties ===
The following is a list of counties in Michigan with populations of at least 50,000 based on 1930 U.S. Census data. Historic census data from 1920 and 1940 are included to reflect trends in population increases or decreases.

1930 Rank	County	Largest city	1920 Pop.	1930 Pop.	1940 Pop.	Change 1930-40
1	Wayne	Detroit	1,177,645	1,888,946	2,015,623	6.7%
2	Kent	Grand Rapids	183,041	240,511	246,338	2.4%
3	Genesee	Flint	125,668	211,641	227,944	7.7%
4	Oakland	Pontiac	90,050	211,251	254,068	20.3%
5	Saginaw	Saginaw	100,286	120,717	130,468	8.1%
6	Ingham	Lansing	81,554	116,587	130,616	12.0%
7	Jackson	Jackson	72,539	92,304	93,108	0.9%
8	Kalamazoo	Kalamazoo	71,225	91,368	100,085	9.5%
9	Calhoun	Battle Creek	72,918	87,043	94,206	8.2%
10	Muskegon	Muskegon	62,362	84,630	94,501	11.7%
11	Berrien	Benton Harbor	62,653	81,066	89,117	9.9%
12	Macomb	Warren	38,103	77,146	107,638	39.5%
13	Bay	Bay City	69,548	69,474	74,981	7.9%
14	St. Clair	Port Huron	58,009	67,563	76,222	12.8%
15	Washtenaw	Ann Arbor	49,520	65,530	80,810	23.3%
16	Ottawa	Holland	47,660	54,858	59,660	8.8%
17	Houghton	Houghton	71,930	52,851	47,631	−9.9%
18	Monroe	Monroe	37,115	52,485	58,620	11.7%
19	Lenawee	Adrian	47,767	49,849	53,110	6.5%

== Sports ==
=== Baseball ===
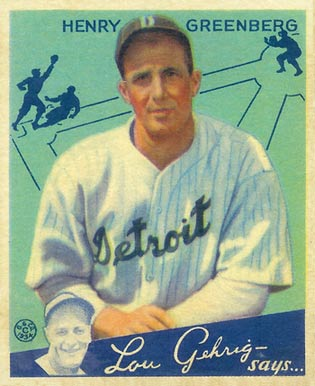
Hank Greenberg

- 1939 Detroit Tigers season – Under manager Del Baker, the Tigers compiled an 81–73 record and finished in fifth place in the American League. The team's statistical leaders included Charlie Gehringer with a .325 batting average, Hank Greenberg with 33 home runs and 113 RBIs, Tommy Bridges and Bobo Newsom with 17 wins each, and Newsom with a 3.37 earned run average.
- 1939 Michigan Wolverines baseball season - Under head coach Ray Fisher, the Wolverines compiled an 18–9–2 record. Walter Peckinpaugh was the team captain.

=== American football ===
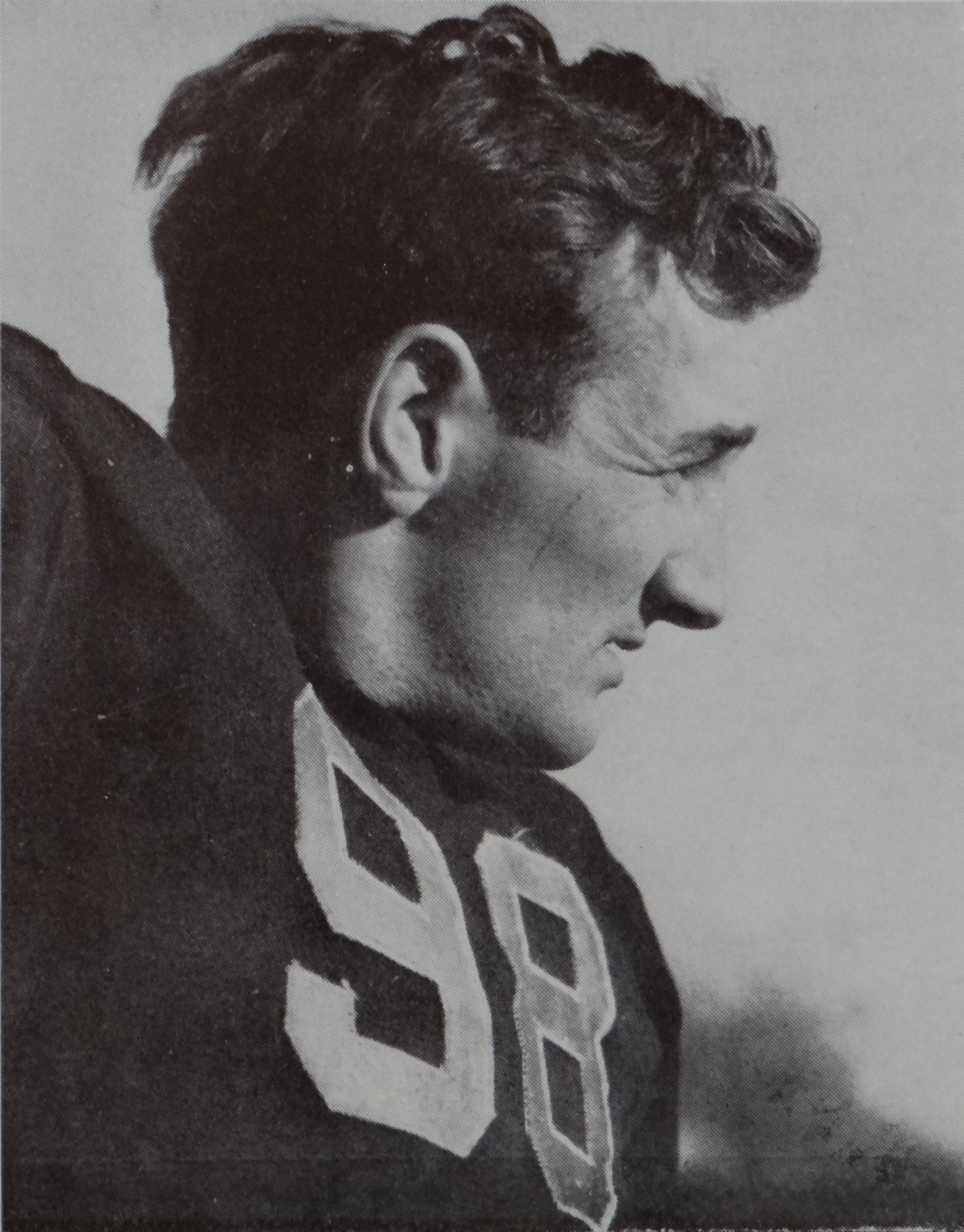
Tom Harmon

- 1939 Detroit Lions season – Under head coach Gus Henderson, the Lions compiled a 6–5 record and placed third in the NFL's Western Division. The team's statistical leaders included Dwight Sloan with 658 passing yards, Bill Shepherd with 420 rushing yards, and Chuck Hanneman with 257 receiving yards and 29 points scored.
- 1939 Michigan Wolverines football team – Under head coach Fritz Crisler, the Wolverines compiled a 6–2 record, tied for fourth place in the Big Ten Conference, and were ranked No. 20 in the final AP Poll. Tom Harmon was selected as the team's Most Valuable Player and was also named a consensus All-American.
- 1939 Michigan State Spartans football team – Under head coach Charlie Bachman, the Spartans compiled a 4–4–1 record.
- 1939 Detroit Titans football team – The Titans compiled a 5–3–1 record under head coach Gus Dorais.
- 1939 Central Michigan Bearcats football team - Under head coach Ron Finch the Bercats compiled an 8–1 record.
- 1938 Western State Hilltoppers football team - Under head coach Mike Gary, the Hilltoppers compiled a 2–6–1 record.
- 1939 Michigan State Normal Hurons football team - Under head coach Elton Rynearson, the Hurons compiled a 3–3–1 record.
- 1939 Wayne Tartars football team – The Tartars compiled a 4–5 record under head coach Joe Gembis.

=== Basketball ===
- 1938–39 Detroit Titans men's basketball team – Under head coach Lloyd Brazil, the Titans compiled a 15–5 record.
- 1938–39 Wayne Tartars men's basketball team – Under coach Newman Ertell, Wayne compiled a 14–5 record.
- 1938–39 Michigan Wolverines men's basketball team – Under head coach Bennie Oosterbaan, the Wolverines compiled an 11–9 record.
- 1938–39 Michigan State Spartans men's basketball team – Under head coach Benjamin Van Alstyne, the Spartans compiled a 9–8 record.
- 1938–39 Western Michigan Broncos men's basketball team – Under head coach Buck Read, the Broncos compiled a 7–10 record.

=== Ice hockey ===
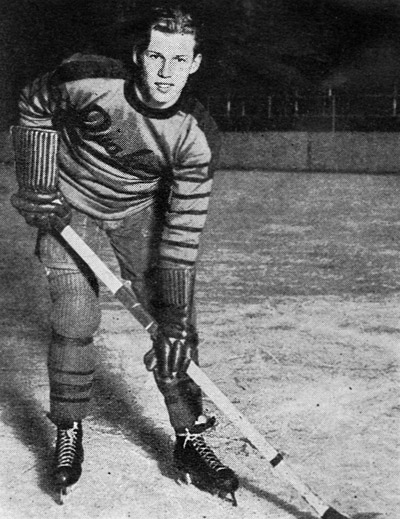
Syd Howe

- 1938–39 Detroit Red Wings season – Under coach Jack Adams, the Red Wings compiled an 18–24–6 record and finished in fifth place in the National Hockey League (NHL). The team's statistical leaders included Syd Howe with 16 goals, Marty Barry and 41 points. Tiny Thompson was the team's goaltender.
- 1938–39 Michigan Wolverines men's ice hockey team – Under head coach Ed Lowrey, the Wolverines compiled an 8–8–2 record.
- 1938–39 Michigan Tech Huskies men's ice hockey team – Under head coach Ed Maki, the Huskies compiled a 6–8 record.

=== Other ===
- Port Huron to Mackinac Boat Race – In the 15th annual sailing race, Manitou skippered by James R. Lowe, won the racing-cruising division, and Iolanthe, a 36-foot yawl, won the cruising class.
- Michigan Open - Marvin Stahl from Lansing won his third Michigan Open title on July 30 at the Western Golf and Country Club in Redford.
- APBA Gold Cup – On September 4, Zalmon G. Simmons' My Sin won the Gold Cup powerboat race on the Detroit River with an average speed of 66.227 miles per hour.

== Chronology of events ==
- January 1 - Upon leaving office as Governor of Michigan, Frank Murphy was chosen by President Franklin D. Roosevelt as the United States Attorney General.
- January 2 - Frank Fitzgerald and Luren Dickinson were sworn in as Governor and Lieutenant Governor in a ceremony in the House chamber in Lansing.
- January 2 - Frank Murphy was sworn in as Attorney General in a ceremony at the White House with President Roosevelt present.
- January 7 - UAW president Homer Martin suspended all of the officers in UAW Local 51 in Plymouth which he charged was dominated by Communists and which he referred to as "Moscow Square". The suspensions led to calls for the union's executive board to meet, and for Martin to be removed as union president. The board suspended Martin's duty as editor of the union's weekly newspaper on January 11, and reinstated the suspended officers from Local 51 on January 12. On January 13, 3,000 U.A.W members, starting with a pro-Martin and followed by an anti-Martin faction, occupied the Griswold building where the UAW had its headquarters, cut off elevator service, and packed the stairways from the first to eleventh floors. On January 17, the board called for special convention of delegates to be held in Cleveland on March 20.
- January 17 - The Senate voted to confirm Frank Murphy as Attorney General with seven dissenting votes. Michigan Senator Vandenberg opposed the confirmation.
- January 20 - The UAW executive board voted to impeach union president Homer Martin. Martin then suspended 15 of the 24 board members and announced that the new board had voted to reinstate him.
- January 23 - The suspended members of the UAW executive board named R. J. Thomas as the union's acting president to replace Homer Martin. They also voted to suspend the executive board members retained by Martin. On January 24, CIO officials in Washington, D.C., repudiated Martin and recognized Thomas as the UAW's president. Martin responded that the action was a declaration of war by the CIO against the UAW and that John L. Lewis was seeking to become the dictator of organized labor.

== Births ==
- January 23 - Brothers Hildebrandt, fantasy and science fiction artists, in Detroit
- February 3 - Johnny Bristol, musician, most famous as a songwriter and record producer for Motown, in Detroit
- April 5 - Ronald White, co-founder of The Miracles, in Detroit
- April 7 - Francis Ford Coppola, film director, in Detroit
- April 10 - Alan Rothenberg, lawyer and sports executive, President of the U.S. Soccer Federation (1990–1998), in Detroit
- April 23 - Lee Majors, actor (The Big Valley, The Six Million Dollar Man, The Fall Guy), in Wyandotte, Michigan
- May 11 - Milt Pappas, Major League Baseball pitcher (1957–1973) and 3x All-Star, in Detroit
- June 6 - Richard "Popcorn" Wylie, pianist, bandleader, songwriter, occasional singer, and record producer, in Detroit
- September 1 - Lily Tomlin, actress, comedian, and writer (Rowan & Martin's Laugh-In, Nashville, Grace and Frankie), in Detroit
- October 30 - Eddie Holland, a member of Motown's Holland–Dozier–Holland songwriting and production team, in Detroit
- November 3 - Howard Wolpe, U.S. Congressman (1979–1993), in Saugatuck, Michigan
- November 19 - Warren "Pete" Moore, bass singer for The Miracles, in Detroit
- December 11 - Tom Hayden, activist, author and politician, best for his role as an anti-war, civil rights, and counterculture activist, in Detroit
- December 20 - Kim Weston, Motown singer, in Detroit

=== Gallery of 1939 births ===
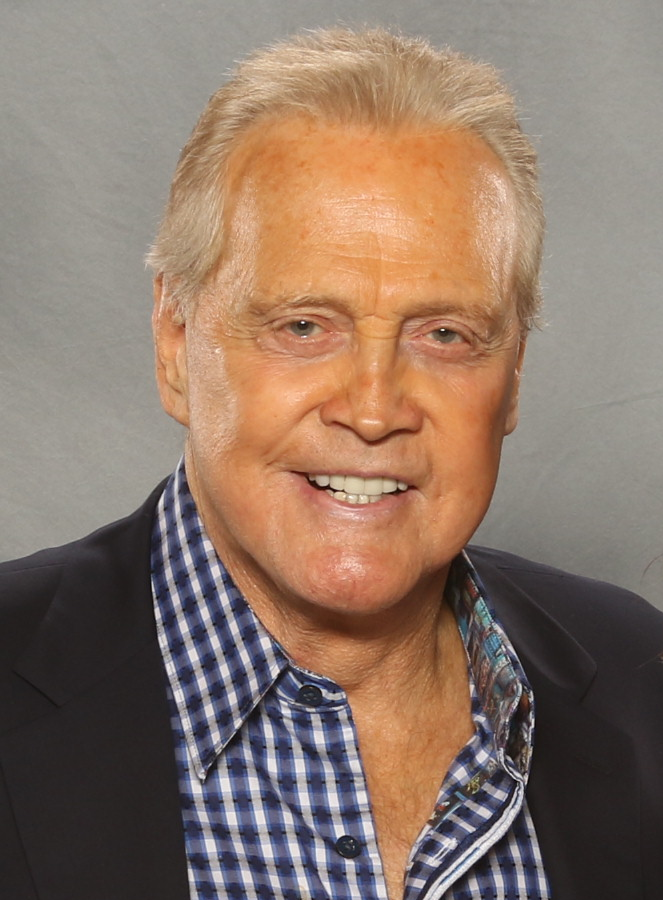
Lee Majors

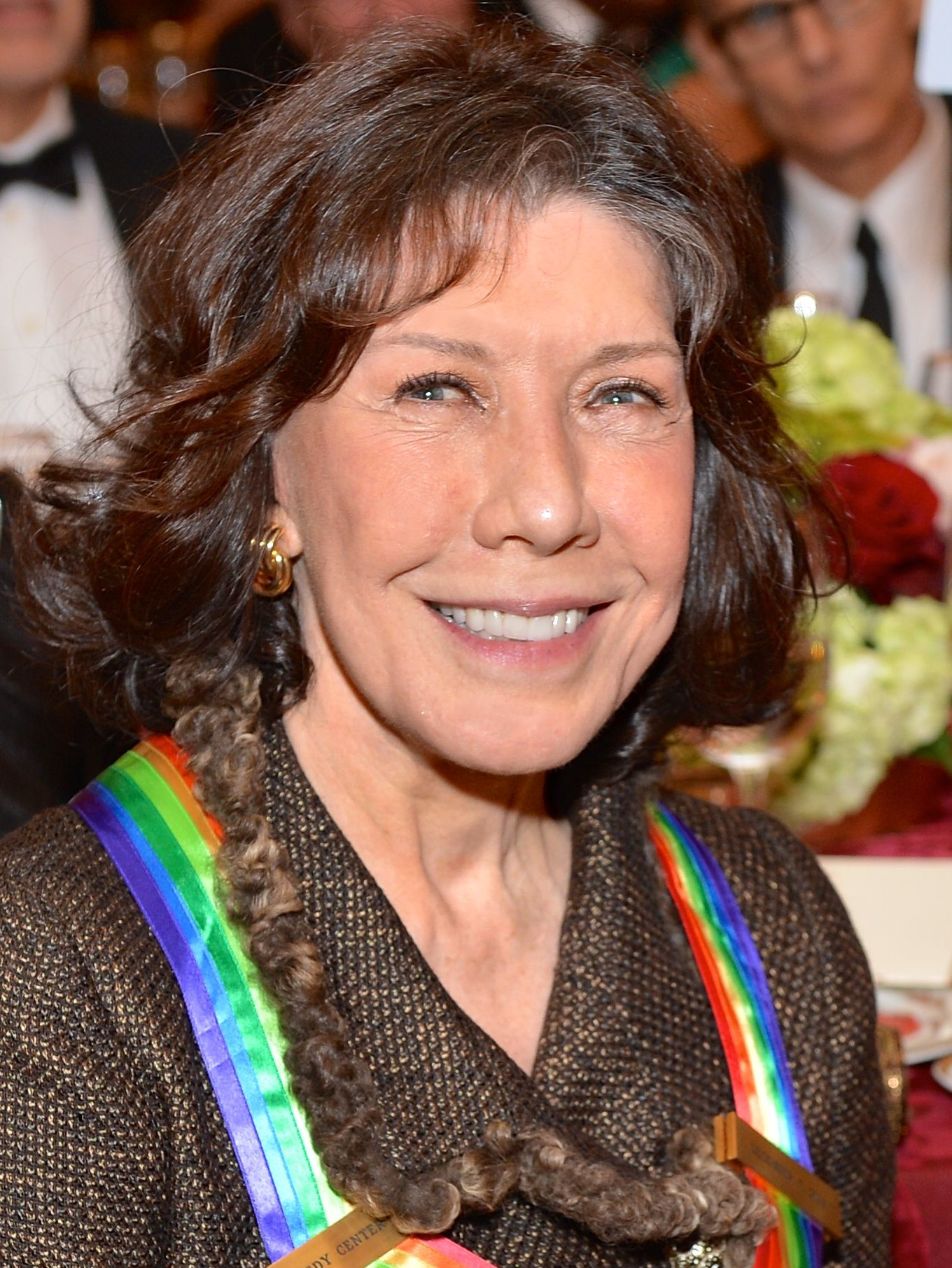
Lily Tomlin

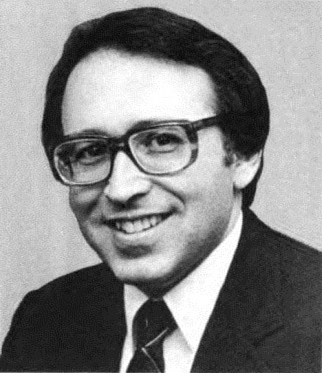
Howard Wolpe

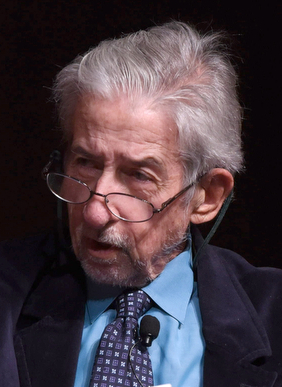
Tom Hayden

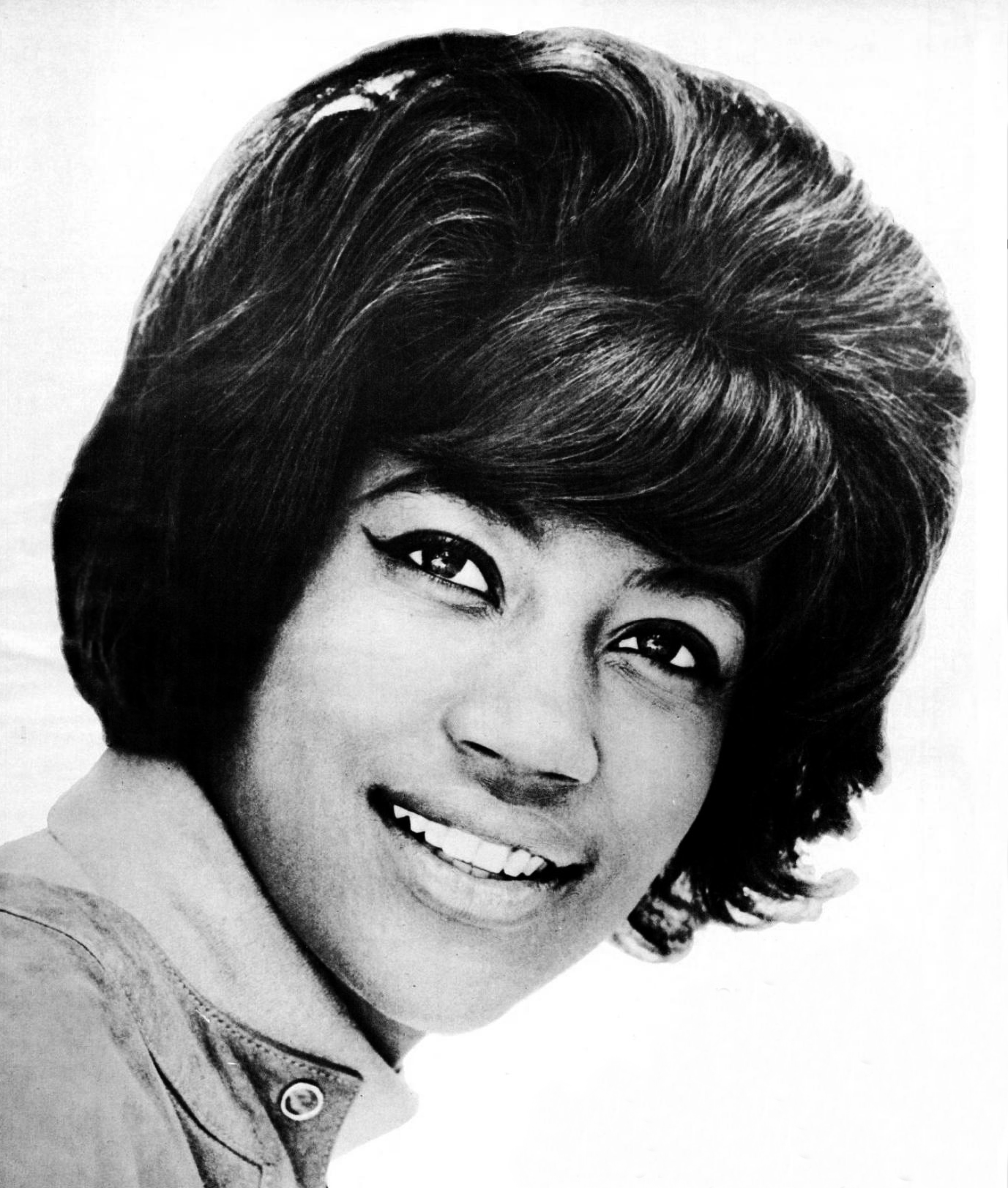
Kim Weston

== Deaths ==
- March 16 - Frank Fitzgerald, Governor of Michigan (1935–1937, 1939), at age 54 in Grand Ledge, Michigan
- March 16 - Sam Dungan, star player of the Detroit Creams/Tigers from 1894 to 1899, at age 72 in Santa Ana, California
- June 26 - Ford Madox Ford, novelist (The Good Soldier) who taught at Olivet College, at age 65 in France
- July 7 - Deacon White, baseball player from 1868 to 1890, at age 91 in St. Charles Township, Illinois
- September 29 - Irving Kane Pond, architect, scored the first touchdown in University of Michigan football history in 1879, at age 82 in Washington, D.C.
- December 12 - Carl E. Mapes, U.S. Congressman (1913–1939), at age 64

=== Gallery of 1939 deaths ===
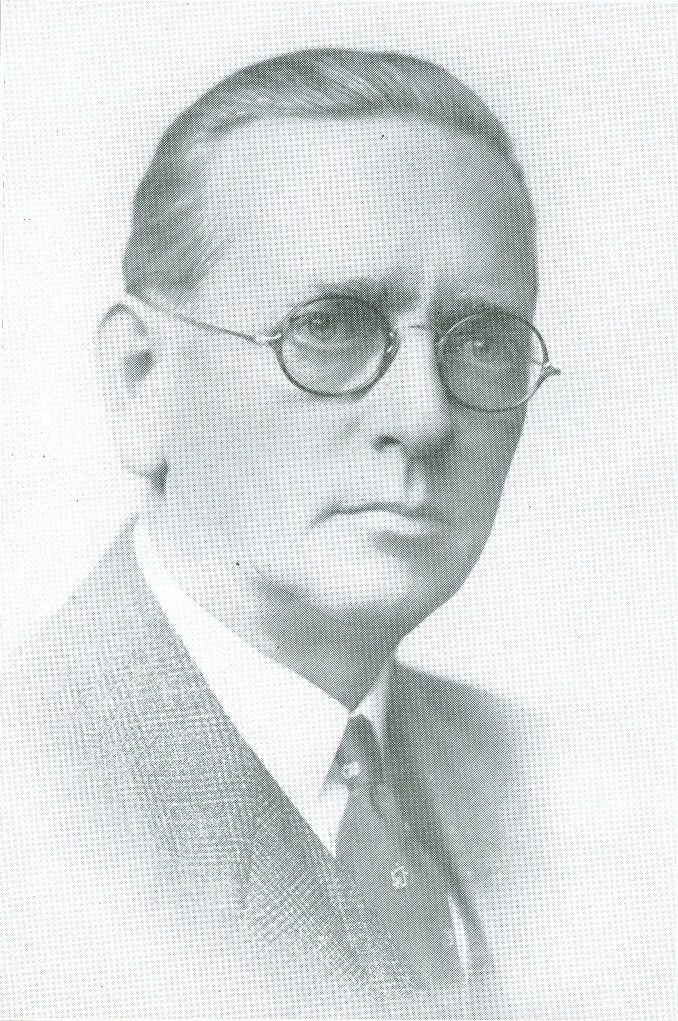
Frank Fitzgerald

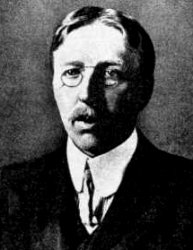
Ford Maddox Ford

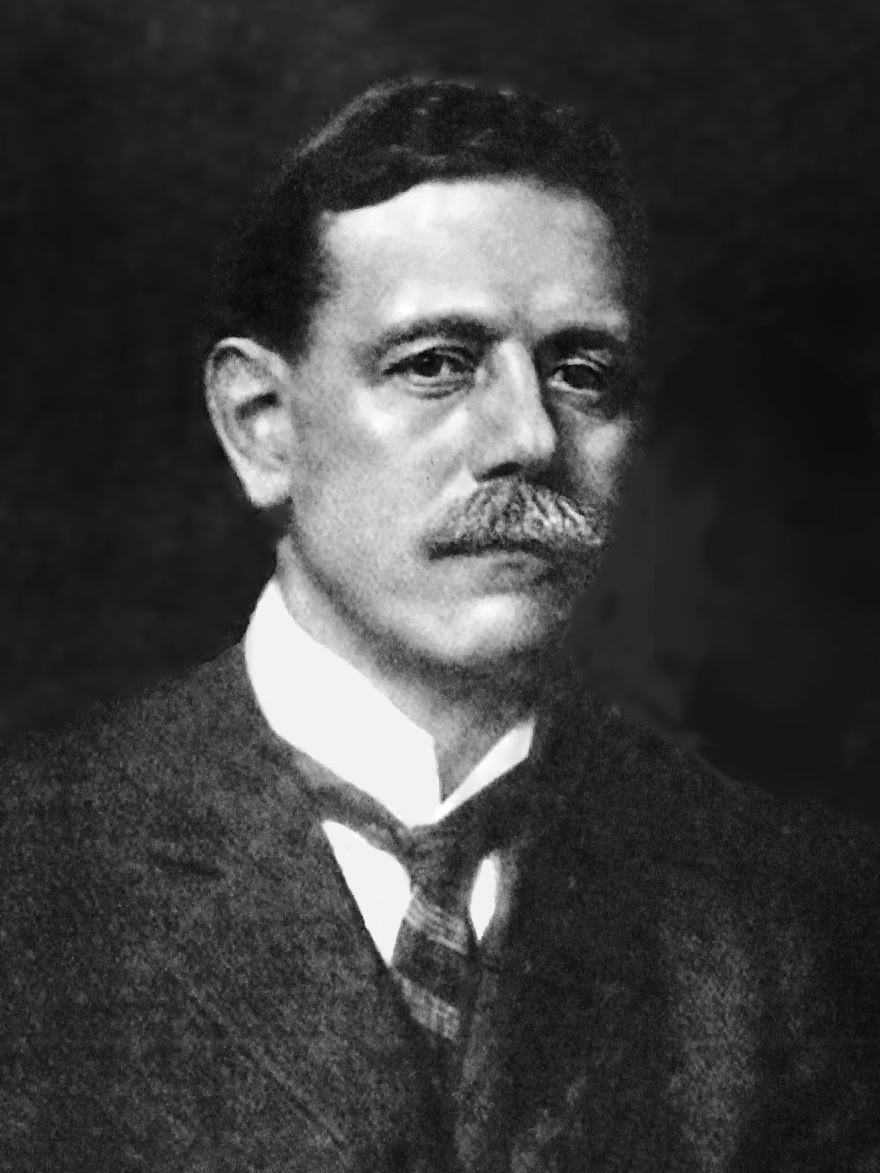
Irving Kane Pond

== See also ==
- History of Michigan
- History of Detroit
