= 1940 in Michigan =

- Decades: 1920s; 1930s; 1940s; 1950s; 1960s
- See also: History of Michigan; Historical outline of Michigan; List of years in Michigan; 1940 in the United States

Events from the year 1940 in Michigan.

== Top stories ==
The Associated Press polled editors of its member newspapers in Michigan and ranked the state's top news stories of 1940 as follows:

1. The Armistice Day storm that killed 67 persons and destroyed five vessels on Lake Michigan
2. The indictment of Frank McKay, Michigan's Republican national committeeman on federal mail fraud charges
3. Michigan's contribution to the national defense effort, including conversion of automobile manufacturing facilities to the production of airplanes, tanks, and machine guns; draft registration of 672,000 men; national guardsmen called to a year's training; and Henry Ford expressing his view on the new war
4. The November 5 election, including the defeat of 81-year-old Governor Luren Dickinson by Democrat Murray Van Wagoner; widespread ballot-splitting; and a victory for advocates of a statewide civil service system
5. The indictment of numerous Detroit and Wayne County officials on graft charges, including Wayne County Prosecutor Duncan C. McRea, Detroit Mayor Richard Reading, Wayne County Sheriff Thomas C. Wilcox, and Detroit Police Superintendent Fred Frahm
6. 1940 Detroit Tigers season, including the declaration of young players to be free agents, the American League pennant, Bobo Newsom's performance, and defeat in the 1940 World Series
7. Wendell Willkie's visit to Michigan, where he was targeted with tomatoes, eggs and other objects, and his narrow victory over Franklin Roosevelt in the November 5 vote count in Michigan
8. Tom Harmon's All-American performance for the 1940 Michigan Wolverines football team
9. The service of Matilda Dodge Wilson as the first woman to serve as Michigan's Lieutenant Governor, a position she held from January 1, 1940, to January 1, 1941
10. The defeat of Michigan Attorney General Thomas Read in his campaign for renomination by a bloc seeking to end "boss rule" of the state's Republican Party

Other stories receiving votes included a political fight over the extent of state aid for the care and treatment of crippled children; a murder-suicide of Wayne County Judge Robert Sage and two of his associates; the 1940 Census results entitling Michigan to an additional congressman and showed a population shift away from urban districts; Congressional approval for construction of the Mackinac Bridge; and the appointment of former Governor Frank Murphy to the U.S. Supreme Court.

== Office holders ==
=== State office holders ===
- Governor of Michigan: Luren Dickinson (Republican)
- Lieutenant Governor of Michigan: Matilda Dodge Wilson (Republican)
- Michigan Attorney General: Thomas Read (Republican)
- Michigan Secretary of State: Harry Kelly (Republican)
- Speaker of the Michigan House of Representatives: Howard Nugent (Republican)
- Chief Justice, Michigan Supreme Court: George E. Bushnell

=== Mayors of major cities ===
- Mayor of Detroit: Edward Jeffries (Republican)
- Mayor of Grand Rapids: George W. Welsh (Republican)
- Mayor of Flint: Harry M. Comins/Oliver Tappin/William Osmund Kelly
- Mayor of Lansing: Max A. Templeton
- Mayor of Dearborn: John Carey
- Mayor of Saginaw: John W. Symons, Jr.
- Mayor of Ann Arbor: Walter C. Sadler

=== Federal office holders ===
- U.S. Senator from Michigan: Prentiss M. Brown (Democrat)
- U.S. Senator from Michigan: Arthur Vandenberg (Republican)
- House District 1: Rudolph G. Tenerowicz (Democrat)
- House District 2: Earl C. Michener (Republican)
- House District 3: Paul W. Shafer (Republican)
- House District 4: Clare Hoffman (Republican)
- House District 5: Bartel J. Jonkman (Republican)
- House District 6: William W. Blackney (Republican)
- House District 7: Jesse P. Wolcott (Republican)
- House District 8: Fred L. Crawford (Republican)
- House District 9: Albert J. Engel (Republican)
- House District 10: Roy O. Woodruff (Republican)
- House District 11: Frederick Van Ness Bradley (Republican)
- House District 12: Frank Eugene Hook (Democrat)
- House District 13: Clarence J. McLeod (Republican)
- House District 14: Louis C. Rabaut (Democrat)
- House District 15: John D. Dingell Sr. (Democrat)
- House District 16: John Lesinski Sr. (Democrat)
- House District 17: George Anthony Dondero (Republican)

== Population ==
In the 1940 United States census, Michigan was recorded as having a population of 5,256,106, ranking as the seventh most populous state in the country. By 1950, Michigan's population had increased by 21.2% to 6,371,766.

=== Cities ===
The following is a list of cities in Michigan with a population of at least 20,000 based on 1940 U.S. Census data. Historic census data from 1930 and 1950 is included to reflect trends in population increases or decreases. Cities that are part of the Detroit metropolitan area are shaded in tan.

1940 Rank	City	County	1940 Pop.	1946 Est.	1950 Pop.	Change 1940-50
1	Detroit	Wayne	1,623,452	1,815,000	1,849,568	13.9%
2	Grand Rapids	Kent	164,292		176,515	7.4%
3	Flint	Genesee	151,543		163,143	7.7%
4	Saginaw	Saginaw	82,794		92,918	12.2%
5	Lansing	Ingham	78,753	90,000	92,129	17.0%
6	Pontiac	Oakland	66,626		73,681	10.6%
7	Dearborn	Wayne	63,589		94,994	49.4%
8	Kalamazoo	Kalamazoo	54,097		57,704	6.7%
9	Highland Park	Wayne	50,810		46,393	−8.7%
10	Hamtramck	Wayne	49,839	48,938	43,555	−12.6%
11	Jackson	Jackson	49,656		51,088	2.9%
12	Bay City	Bay	47,956		52,523	9.5%
13	Muskegon	Muskegon	47,697		48,429	1.5%
14	Battle Creek	Calhoun	43,453		48,666	12.0%
15	Port Huron	St. Clair	32,759		35,725	9.1%
16	Wyandotte	Wayne	30,618		36,846	20.3%
17	Ann Arbor	Washtenaw	29,815		48,251	61.8%
18	Royal Oak	Oakland	25,087		46,898	86.9%
19	Ferndale	Oakland	22,523		29,675	31.8%

=== Counties ===
The following is a list of counties in Michigan with populations of at least 75,000 based on 1940 U.S. Census data. Historic census data from 1930 and 1950 are included to reflect trends in population increases or decreases.

1940 Rank	County	Largest city	1930 Pop.	1940 Pop.	1950 Pop.	Change 1940-50
1	Wayne	Detroit	1,888,946	2,015,623	2,435,235	20.8%
2	Oakland	Pontiac	211,251	254,068	396,001	55.9%
3	Kent	Grand Rapids	240,511	246,338	288,292	17.0%
4	Genesee	Flint	211,641	227,944	270,963	18.9%
5	Ingham	Lansing	116,587	130,616	172,941	32.4%
6	Saginaw	Saginaw	120,717	130,468	153,515	17.7%
7	Macomb	Warren	77,146	107,638	184,961	71.8%
8	Kalamazoo	Kalamazoo	91,368	100,085	126,707	26.6%
9	Jackson	Jackson	92,304	93,108	108,168	16.2%
10	Muskegon	Muskegon	84,630	94,501	121,545	28.6%
11	Calhoun	Battle Creek	87,043	94,206	120,813	28.2%

== Companies ==
The following is a list of major companies based in Michigan in 1940.

Company	1940 sales (millions)	1940 net earnings (millions)	Headquarters	Core business
General Motors			Detroit	Automobiles
Ford Motor Company	na	na		Automobiles
Chrysler				Automobiles
Studebaker Corp.				Automobiles
Briggs Mfg. Co.			Detroit	Automobile parts supplier
S. S. Kresge				Retail
Hudson Motor Car Co.			Detroit	Automobiles
Detroit Edison				Electric utility
Michigan Bell				Telephone utility
Kellogg's			Battle Creek	Breakfast cereal
Parke-Davis			Detroit	Pharmaceutical
REO Motor Car Co.			Lansing	Automobiles
Burroughs Adding Machine				Business machines

== Sports ==
=== Baseball ===
- 1940 Detroit Tigers season – Under manager Del Baker, the Tigers compiled a 90–64 record, won the American League pennant, and were defeated by the Cincinnati Reds in the 1940 World Series. Left fielder Hank Greenberg led Major League Baseball (MLB) with 150 RBIs, 99 extra-base hits, and a .674 slugging percentage. Center fielder Barney McCosky led MLB with 200 hits and 19 triples. Greenberg and McCosky both compiled .340 batting averages. Bobo Newsom led the pitching staff with at 21-5 record, a 2.83 earned run average, and 164 strikeouts.
- 1940 Michigan Wolverines baseball season - Under head coach Ray Fisher, the Wolverines compiled a 10–12 record. Charles Pinka was the team captain.

=== American football ===
- 1940 Detroit Lions season – Under head coach Potsy Clark, the Lions compiled a 5–5–1 record. The team's statistical leaders included Whizzer White led the team with 514 rushing yards, 461 passing yards, and 32 points scored, and Lloyd Cardwell with 349 receiving yards.
- 1940 Michigan Wolverines football team – Under head coach Fritz Crisler, the Wolverines compiled a 7-1 record and were ranked No. 3 in the final AP Poll. Tom Harmon won the 1940 Heisman Trophy.
- 1940 Michigan State Spartans football team – Under head coach Charlie Bachman the Spartans compiled a 3–4–1 record.
- 1940 Detroit Titans football team – Under head coach Gus Dorais, the Titans compiled a 7–2 record.
- 1940 Wayne State Tartars football team - Under head coach Joe Gembis, the team compiled a 4–1–3 record.
- 1940 Central Michigan Bearcats football team - Under head coach Ron Finch, the team compiled a 4–3–1 record.
- 1940 Western State Broncos football team - Under head coach Mike Gary, the team compiled a 2–5 record.
- 1940 Michigan State Normal Hurons football team - Under head coach Elton Rynearson, the team compiled a 1–5–1 record.

=== Basketball ===
- 1939–40 Detroit Titans men's basketball team – Bob Calihan, the Titans' 6-foot, 4-inch center, concluded his playing career with 332 points in 24 games. In three seasons with the Titans, Calihan scored 795 points in 63 games.
- 1939–40 Michigan Wolverines men's basketball team – Under head coach Bennie Oosterbaan, the Wolverines compiled a 13–7 record. James Rae led the team with 199 points.

=== Ice hockey ===
- 1939–40 Detroit Red Wings season – Under head coach Jack Adams, the Red Wings compiled a 16–26–6 record. Syd Howe led the team with 14 goals, 23 assists, and 37 points. Tiny Thompson was the team's goalkeeper in 46 of 48 games. Ebbie Goodfellow was the team captain.

=== Boat racing ===
- APBA Gold Cup – Sidney Allen won the Gold Cup in the Hotsy Totsy III.
- Port Huron to Mackinac Boat Race – The yawl Manitou, skippered by James Rowland Lowe, won the annual yacht race on July 14, setting a new record time of 32 hours, 45 minutes.

=== Boxing ===
- Heavyweight champion Joe Louis defended his heavyweight title in four matches against Arturo Godoy (February 9, split decision), Johnny Paychek (March 29, TKO), Arturo Godoy (June 20, TKO), and Al McCoy (December 16, corner retirement).

=== Golfing ===
- Michigan Open - Emerick Kocsis won the Michigan Open on August 18 at the Midland Country Club in Midland, Michigan

== Chronology of events ==
=== February ===
- February 19 - Republican Bartel J. Jonkman was elected in a special election to fill the vacancy left by Republican U.S. Congressman Carl E. Mapes's death in office on December 12, 1939.

=== September ===
- September 10 - The gubernatorial primaries occurred for the November 5th election. The results:
  - Democratic primary - Murray Van Wagoner becomes the Democratic nominee for governor, defeating Eugene Van Antwerp.
  - Republican primary - Luren Dickinson becomes the Republican nominee for governor, defeating Thomas Read.

=== November ===
- November 5 - A number of elections occurred, including:
  - President of the United States - Republican nominee Wendell Willkie defeats incumbent Democratic President Franklin D. Roosevelt in Michigan with 49.85% of the popular vote. Willkie is defeated by Roosevelt nationally.
  - United States Senate - Incumbent Republican U.S. Senator Arthur Vandenberg was re-elected.
  - United States House of Representatives - All of Michigan's 17 U.S. Representatives won re-election except for Republican Clarence J. McLeod, who was defeated by Democrat George D. O'Brien. In the delegation, there were five Democrats and twelve Republicans.
  - Michigan Governor - Democratic nominee Murray Van Wagoner defeated incumbent Republican Governor Luren Dickinson.

== Births ==
- January 31 - George Mans, American football player and coach, in Detroit
- February 15 - Leon Ware, songwriter and producer for Marvin Gaye and Michael Jackson, in Detroit
- February 19 - Smokey Robinson, singer, songwriter, and record producer, and the founder and front man of the Motown vocal group The Miracles, in Detroit
- May 10 - Stephen M. Ross, real estate developer and sports team owner, in Detroit
- May 10 - Wayne Dyer, self-help author and a motivational speaker, in Detroit
- May 12 - Norman Whitfield, songwriter and producer ("I Heard It Through the Grapevine", "Just My Imagination (Running Away with Me)" ) credited with creating the Motown sound, in Harlem, New York City
- July 6 - Rex Cawley, gold medalist 400 meter hurdles at 1964 Summer Olympics, in Highland Park, MI
- August 22 - Bill McCartney, American football coach and the founder of the Promise Keepers men's ministry, in Riverview, MI
- August 29 - Bennie Maupin, jazz multireedist, in Detroit
- October 16 - Dave DeBusschere, Basketball Hall of Fame, in Detroit
- November 2 - Ed Budde, American football guard 5× AFL All-Star, in Highland Park, MI
- November 11 - Dennis Coffey, guitarist known for his 1971 Top 10 hit single "Scorpio", in Detroit

== Deaths ==
- August 18 - Walter Chrysler, founder of Chrysler Corporation, at age 65 in Kings Point, NY

== See also ==
- History of Michigan
- History of Detroit
