= 1941 in Michigan =

- Decades: 1920s; 1930s; 1940s; 1950s; 1960s
- See also: History of Michigan; Historical outline of Michigan; List of years in Michigan; 1941 in the United States

Events from the year 1941 in Michigan.

== Top stories ==
The Associated Press polled editors of its member newspapers in Michigan and ranked the state's top news stories of 1941 as follows:

1. Ford strike. A 10-day strike by the United Auto Workers closed the company's Rouge plant, the world's largest factory, from April 1 to April 11. Following skirmishes on the picket lines, injunctions, and court hearings, Ford signed the industry's first contract granting workers the union shop and providing a checkoff system for payment of union dues. The Ford strike dominated the voting with 203 out of 240 points.
2. Conversion to Arsenal of Democracy. The rapid transformation of Michigan's industrial might from the production of automobiles to the production of airplanes, tanks, and guns. New plant construction included Ford's $18 million dollar Willow Run bomber plant in Ypsilanti, the Chrysler Tank Arsenal in Warren, and the $20 million Hudson Naval Ordnance Plant in Center Line. (134 points)
3. Sault Ste. Marie bridge collapse. On October 7, a 330-foot bascule bridge from Sault Ste. Marie, Michigan, to Sault Ste. Marie, Ontario, collapsed under the weight of a passing 35-car freight train. The locomotive crashed through the span, resulting in the death of the engineer and brakeman and a two-day closure of the Soo Locks. The closure halted the shipment of iron ore from the Iron Range for use in defense industries. (120 points)
4. Feud between Governor and Legislature. Democratic Governor Murray Van Wagoner butted heads with the Republican-controlled Legislature. Van Wagoner exercised his veto power 35 times, and the Republicans lacked sufficient numbers to override the vetoes. Republicans retaliated by delaying the effective dates of many laws. (118 points)
5. McKay trial. The fraud trial of Frank McKay, former member of the Republican National Committee, and 11 others in Detroit federal court on charges that he participated in a $500,000 liquor fraud ended when Judge Arthur F. Lederle declared a mistrial on July 12. The jury had deliberated for 32 hours over five days without reaching a verdict. The jury foreman and two other jurors stated that they believed something was amiss and that the holdout jurors had been bribed or tampered with. (116 points)
6. Detroit corruption convictions. A one-man grand jury investigation by Wayne County judge Homer S. Ferguson (later a U.S. Senator from Michigan) pursued government corruption and resulted in (i) the May suicide of indicted contractor Abe Smith by jumping from the 14th floor of a Chicago Hotel, and convictions of three Detroit city councilmen (John F. Hamilton, Robert G. Ewald, Harry I. Dingeman) for taking bribes in connection with the $8.3 million dollar Herman Gardens public housing project; (ii) the conviction of former Detroit Mayor Richard Reading for protecting the numbers racket; (iii) the April convictions of Wayne County's former prosecutor Duncan C. McCrea, sheriff Thomas C. Wilcox, and 23 others for conspiring to protect vice and gambling operations; and (iv) the June conviction of police superintendent Fred W. Frahm and three police officers for graft in connection with a baseball gambling operation. (106 points)
7. Hank Greenberg. Detroit Tigers star Hank Greenberg made headlines for his involvement in the military draft. In March, Greenberg sought a deferment due to flat feet, a chronic backache, and infected wisdom teeth, but he was placed into Class 1-A in April and inducted into the Army in May. Without Greenberg, the Tigers (who had won the pennant in 1940) dropped to fourth place. Greenberg was discharged from the Army on December 5, but he immediately re-enlisted after Japan's December 7 attack on Pearl Harbor. (99 points)
8. Fishermen stranded on ice floes. A March 15 blizzard with 50-mile-per-hour winds stranded more than 19 ice fishermen and a woman when the storm broke up an ice field near Skanee Point and swept ice floes into Lake Superior. The last five fisherman were rescued on March 18. (66 points)
9. Tie (49 points each) between:

- The November 8 murder of Ada Loveland Torrance, a wealthy 65-year-old widow from Kalamazoo, while on honeymoon in Monterrey, Mexico. Her husband, a tropical disease expert and explorer, was charged with murdering her by a blow to the head and then staging an automobile accident to conceal his crime.
- The January 5 murder of 32-year-old Mary Jane McCarthy witnessed by 500 persons. She was struck by a shotgun blast fired by her estranged husband as she ran down the church aisle during a public ceremony of reconciliation at St. Andrew's Cathedral in Grand Rapids.

The Detroit Free Press editors rated the top news stories of 1941 in the State of Michigan as follows:

1. Ford strike.
2. Detroit corruption convictions.
3. Conversion to Arsenal of Democracy.
4. Sault Ste. Marie bridge collapse.
5. DSR strike. A strike by Detroit Street Railway workers closed the city's mass transportation system for five days from August 20 to August 25.
6. McKay trial.
7. CIO convention. The national CIO convention, held in Detroit in November, was marred by fistfights between contingents loyal to John L. Lewis and Philip Murray.
8. Hank Greenberg.
9. Feud between Governor and Legislature.
10. Defense strikes. Prior to the U.S. entry into World War II, strikes were called against Michigan defense industries, including Dow Chemical in Midland and Great Lakes Steel Corp.

Other stories that narrowly missed the cut for the top 10 stories included:

- The November 3 murder of Wandamay Wheatley, a 20-year-old teletype operator. She was raped, beaten, and left in a thicket five miles south of Saginaw. Winford W. Smith, a 35-year-old taxi driver and father, confessed days later to the crime and was sentenced to life in prison. (47 points in AP poll)
- The October 7 railroad crash in which a speeding freight train jumped the tracks and crashed into Lansing's Grand Trunk station, killing one boy and injuring at least 13 others. (31 points in AP Poll)
- Michigan's October 25 football loss by a 7-0 score to Minnesota. Prior to the game, Michigan was ranked No. 3 in the AP Poll and Minnesota No. 1. (27 points in the AP poll)
- The marriage of 23-year-old Anna Laurine Dodge, a former $18-a-week telephone operator and daughter of a tugboat captain, to a plastic surgeon who she met 18 months earlier as a patient. Dodge had married Daniel Dodge in 1938 and inherited $2.5 million when he drowned while on their honeymoon.
- The October 23 drowning deaths of six crew members when the tugboat America sank in 19 feet of water to the east of Belle Isle. The tugboat sunk while assisting a grounded freighter, B.F. Jones.

== Office holders ==
=== State office holders ===
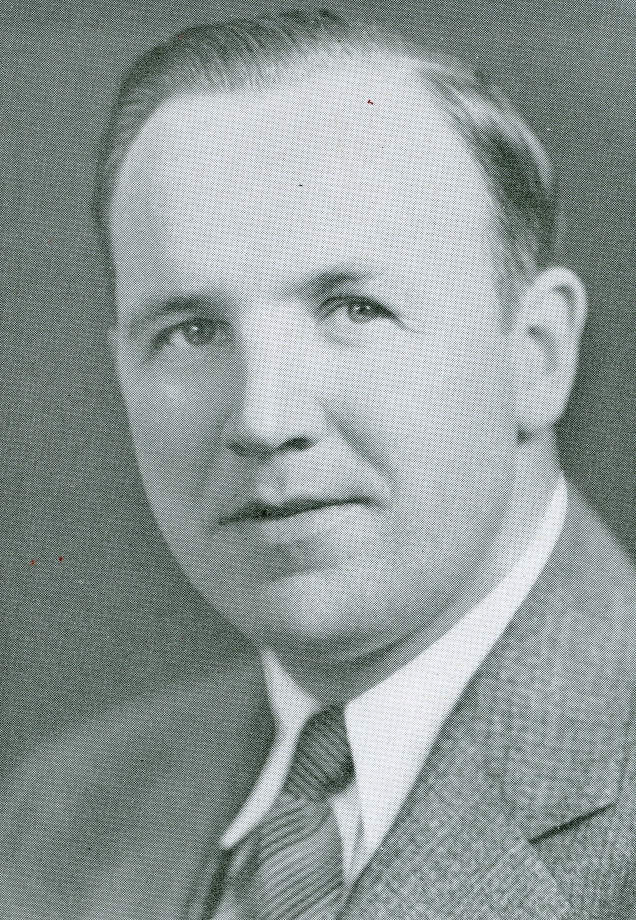
Gov. Murray Van Wagoner

- Governor of Michigan: Murray Van Wagoner (Democrat)
- Lieutenant Governor of Michigan: Matilda Dodge Wilson/Frank Murphy (Democrat)
- Michigan Attorney General: Herbert J. Rushton (Republican)
- Michigan Secretary of State: Harry Kelly (Republican)
- Speaker of the Michigan House of Representatives: Howard Nugent (Republican)
- Chief Justice, Michigan Supreme Court: Edward M. Sharpe

=== Mayors of major cities ===
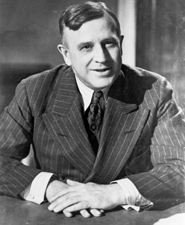
Sen. Prentiss M. Brown

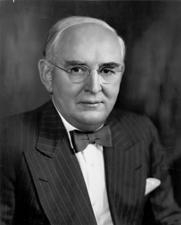
Sen. Arthur Vandenberg

- Mayor of Detroit: Edward Jeffries (Republican)
- Mayor of Grand Rapids: George W. Welsh (Republican)
- Mayor of Flint: William Osmund Kelly
- Mayor of Lansing: Max A. Templeton/Arthur E. Stoppel/Sam Street Hughes
- Mayor of Dearborn: John Carey
- Mayor of Saginaw: John W. Symons, Jr./William J. Brydges
- Mayor of Ann Arbor: Walter C. Sadler/Leigh J. Young

=== Federal office holders ===
- U.S. Senator from Michigan: Prentiss M. Brown (Democrat)
- U.S. Senator from Michigan: Arthur Vandenberg (Republican)
- House District 1: Rudolph G. Tenerowicz (Democrat)
- House District 2: Earl C. Michener (Republican)
- House District 3: Paul W. Shafer (Republican)
- House District 4: Clare Hoffman (Republican)
- House District 5: Bartel J. Jonkman (Republican)
- House District 6: William W. Blackney (Republican)
- House District 7: Jesse P. Wolcott (Republican)
- House District 8: Fred L. Crawford (Republican)
- House District 9: Albert J. Engel (Republican)
- House District 10: Roy O. Woodruff (Republican)
- House District 11: Frederick Van Ness Bradley (Republican)
- House District 12: Frank Eugene Hook (Democrat)
- House District 13: George D. O'Brien (Democrat)
- House District 14: Louis C. Rabaut (Democrat)
- House District 15: John D. Dingell Sr. (Democrat)
- House District 16: John Lesinski Sr. (Democrat)
- House District 17: George Anthony Dondero (Republican)

== Population ==
In the 1940 United States census, Michigan was recorded as having a population of 5,256,106, ranking as the seventh most populous state in the country. By 1950, Michigan's population had increased by 21.2% to 6,371,766.

=== Cities ===
The following is a list of cities in Michigan with a population of at least 20,000 based on 1940 U.S. Census data. Historic census data from 1930 and 1950 is included to reflect trends in population increases or decreases. Cities that are part of the Detroit metropolitan area are shaded in tan.

1940 Rank	City	County	1940 Pop.	1946 Est.	1950 Pop.	Change 1940-50
1	Detroit	Wayne	1,623,452	1,815,000	1,849,568	13.9%
2	Grand Rapids	Kent	164,292		176,515	7.4%
3	Flint	Genesee	151,543		163,143	7.7%
4	Saginaw	Saginaw	82,794		92,918	12.2%
5	Lansing	Ingham	78,753	90,000	92,129	17.0%
6	Pontiac	Oakland	66,626		73,681	10.6%
7	Dearborn	Wayne	63,589		94,994	49.4%
8	Kalamazoo	Kalamazoo	54,097		57,704	6.7%
9	Highland Park	Wayne	50,810		46,393	−8.7%
10	Hamtramck	Wayne	49,839	48,938	43,555	−12.6%
11	Jackson	Jackson	49,656		51,088	2.9%
12	Bay City	Bay	47,956		52,523	9.5%
13	Muskegon	Muskegon	47,697		48,429	1.5%
14	Battle Creek	Calhoun	43,453		48,666	12.0%
15	Port Huron	St. Clair	32,759		35,725	9.1%
16	Wyandotte	Wayne	30,618		36,846	20.3%
17	Ann Arbor	Washtenaw	29,815		48,251	61.8%
18	Royal Oak	Oakland	25,087		46,898	86.9%
19	Ferndale	Oakland	22,523		29,675	31.8%

=== Counties ===
The following is a list of counties in Michigan with populations of at least 75,000 based on 1940 U.S. Census data. Historic census data from 1930 and 1950 are included to reflect trends in population increases or decreases.

1940 Rank	County	Largest city	1930 Pop.	1940 Pop.	1950 Pop.	Change 1940-50
1	Wayne	Detroit	1,888,946	2,015,623	2,435,235	20.8%
2	Oakland	Pontiac	211,251	254,068	396,001	55.9%
3	Kent	Grand Rapids	240,511	246,338	288,292	17.0%
4	Genesee	Flint	211,641	227,944	270,963	18.9%
5	Ingham	Lansing	116,587	130,616	172,941	32.4%
6	Saginaw	Saginaw	120,717	130,468	153,515	17.7%
7	Macomb	Warren	77,146	107,638	184,961	71.8%
8	Kalamazoo	Kalamazoo	91,368	100,085	126,707	26.6%
9	Jackson	Jackson	92,304	93,108	108,168	16.2%
10	Muskegon	Muskegon	84,630	94,501	121,545	28.6%
11	Calhoun	Battle Creek	87,043	94,206	120,813	28.2%

== Companies ==
The following is a list of major companies based in Michigan in 1941.

Company	1941 sales (millions)	1941 net income (millions)	Headquarters	Core business
General Motors			Detroit	Automobiles
Ford Motor Company	na	na		Automobiles
Chrysler				Automobiles
Briggs Mfg. Co.			Detroit	Automobile parts supplier
S. S. Kresge				Retail
Hudson Motor Car Co.			Detroit	Automobiles
Detroit Edison				Electric utility
Michigan Bell				Telephone utility
Kellogg's			Battle Creek	Breakfast cereal
Parke-Davis			Detroit	Pharmaceutical
REO Motor Car Co.			Lansing	Automobiles
Graham-Paige				Automobiles
Burroughs Adding Machine				Business machines

== Sports ==
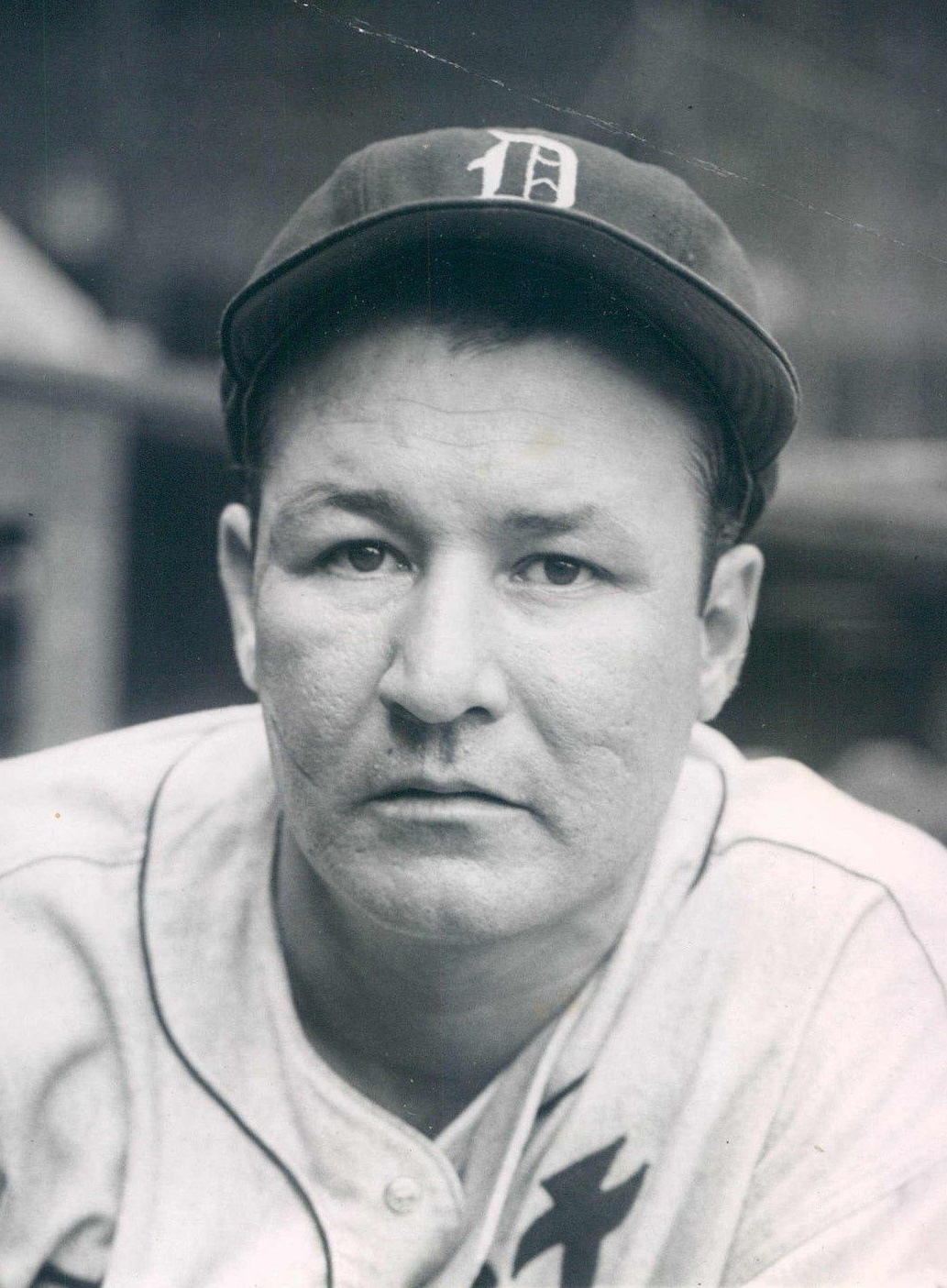
Rudy York

=== Baseball ===
- 1941 Detroit Tigers season – The Tigers compiled a 75–79 record and finished in fourth place in the American League. The team's statistical leaders included Barney McCosky with a .324 batting average, Rudy York with 29 home runs and 111 RBIs, and Al Benton with 15 wins and a 2.97 earned run average.
- 1941 Michigan Wolverines baseball season - Under head coach Ray Fisher, the Wolverines compiled a 24–8 record and won the Big Ten Conference championship. Bill Steppon was the team captain.

=== American football ===
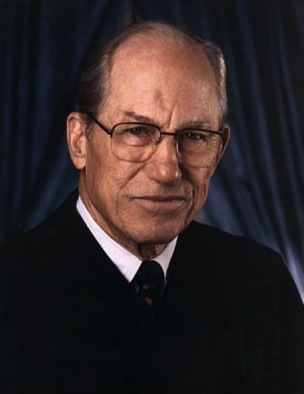
Byron White

- 1941 Detroit Lions season – Under head coach Bill Edwards, the Lions compiled a 4–6–1 record. Byron "Whizzer" White, who later served on the Supreme Court of the United States from 1962 to 1993, led the 1941 Lions with 338 passing yards, 240 rushing yards, 158 receiving yards, and 24 points scored.
- 1941 Michigan Wolverines football team – Under head coach Fritz Crisler, the Wolverines compiled a record of 6–1–1, outscored opponents 147 to 41 and were ranked No. 5 in the final AP Poll. Fullback Bob Westfall was selected as a consensus first-team player on both the 1941 College Football All-America Team.
- 1941 Western Michigan Broncos football team - Under head coach Mike Gary, the Hilltoppers compiled an 8–0 record, shut out four opponents, and outscored all opponents by a combined total of 183 to 27.
- 1941 Michigan State Spartans football team - Under head coach Charlie Bachman, the Spartans compiled a 5–3–1 record.
- 1941 Central Michigan Bearcats football team - Under head coach Ron Finch, the Bearcats compiled a 4–3 record.
- 1941 Michigan State Normal Hurons football team - Under head coach Elton Rynearson, the Hurons compiled a 0–5–2 record.

=== Basketball ===
- 1940–41 Michigan Wolverines men's basketball team – Under head coach Bennie Oosterbaan, the Wolverines compiled a 9-10 record. Michael Sofiak was the team's leading scorer with 192 points in 19 games for an average of 10.1 points per game.
- 1940–41 Michigan State Spartans men's basketball team – Under head coach Benjamin Van Alstyne, the Spartans compiled an 11-6 record.
- 1940–41 Western Michigan Broncos men's basketball team – Under head coach Buck Read, the Broncos compiled a 10-8 record.
- 1940–41 Detroit Titans men's basketball team – Under head coach Lloyd Brazil, the Titans compiled an 11-10 record.

=== Ice hockey ===
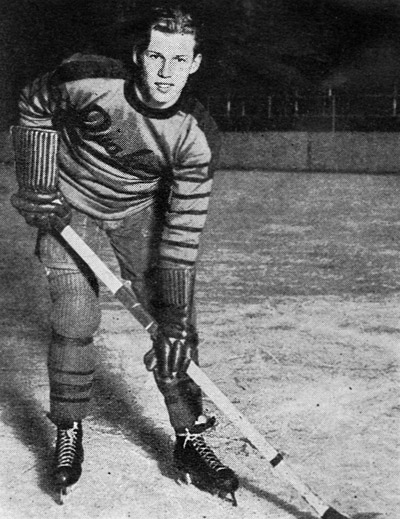
Syd Howe

- 1940–41 Detroit Red Wings season – Under head coach Jack Adams, the Red Wings compiled a 21–16–11 record, finished third in the NHL, won the first two playoff rounds, and lost to the Boston Bruins in the 1941 Stanley Cup Finals. Syd Howe led the team with 20 goals, 24 assists, and 44 points. Johnny Mowers was the goaltender.
- 1940–41 Michigan Wolverines men's ice hockey team – The team compiled a 2–14–1 record under coach Ed Lowrey.
- 1940–41 Michigan Tech Huskies men's ice hockey team – The team compiled a 1–10 record under coach Ed Maki.

== Births ==
- January 18 - David Ruffin, a lead singer with The Temptations (including "My Girl" and "Ain't Too Proud to Beg"), in Mississippi
- February 15 - Brian Holland, songwriter and record producer, best known as a member of Motown's Holland–Dozier–Holland team, in Detroit
- April 5 - Michael Moriarty, actor who won an Emmy and a Tony Award and starred in Law & Order, in Detroit
- May 19 - James P. Hoffa, General President of the International Brotherhood of Teamstersz since 1999, in Detroit
- May 23 - Rennie Davis, anti-war activist and one of the Chicago Seven defendants, in Lansing
- June 15 - Lamont Dozier, songwriter and record producer, best known as a member of Motown's Holland–Dozier–Holland team, in Detroit
- June 18 - Martha Reeves, Motown star (Dancing in the Street, Heat Wave, Jimmy Mack) and Detroit City Council member (2005-2009), in Alabama
- October 2 - John Sinclair, jazz poet, writer, and political activist, in Flint
- November 29 - Bill Freehan, baseball catcher and 11× All-Star, in Detroit

=== Gallery of 1941 births ===
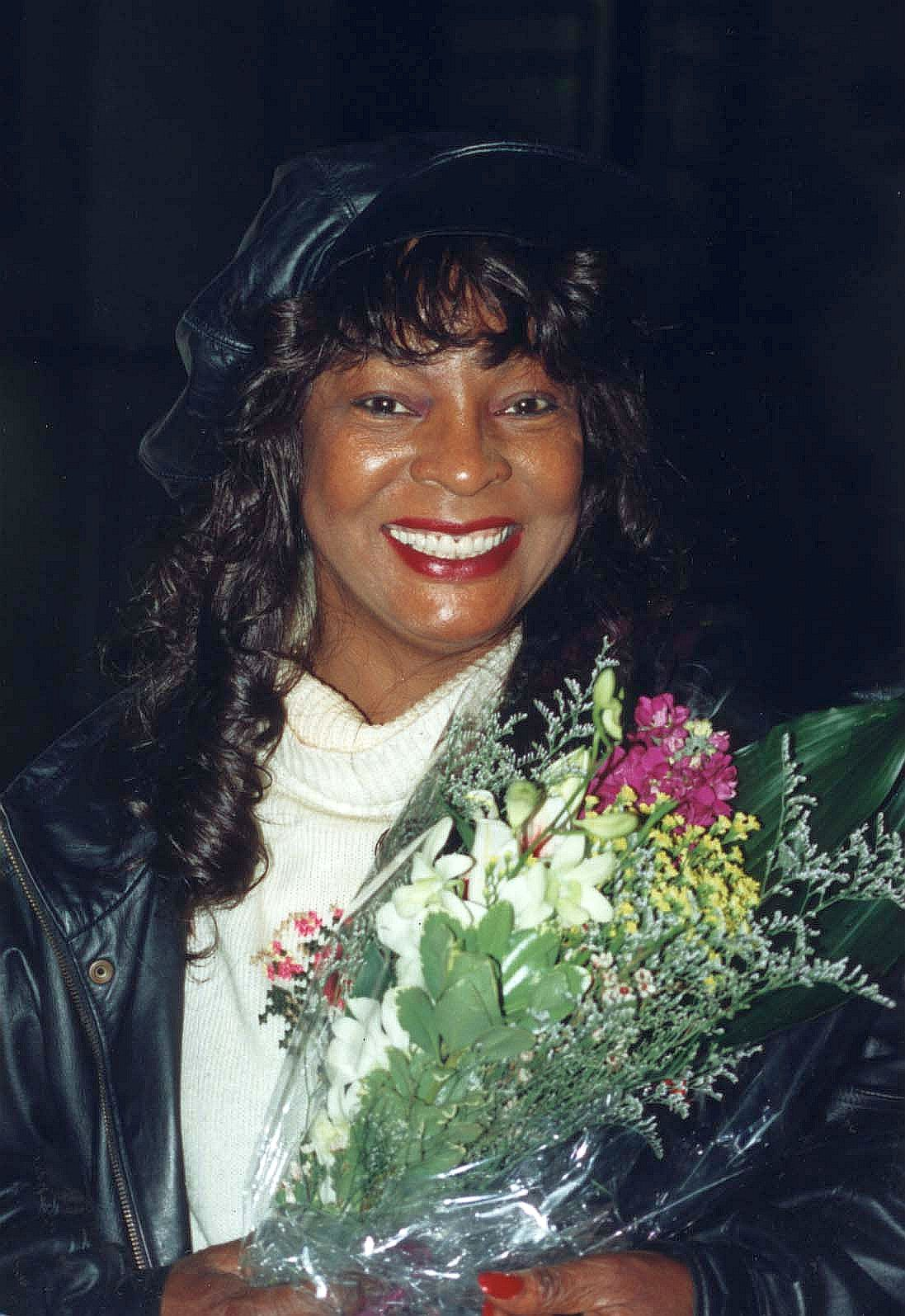
Martha Reeves

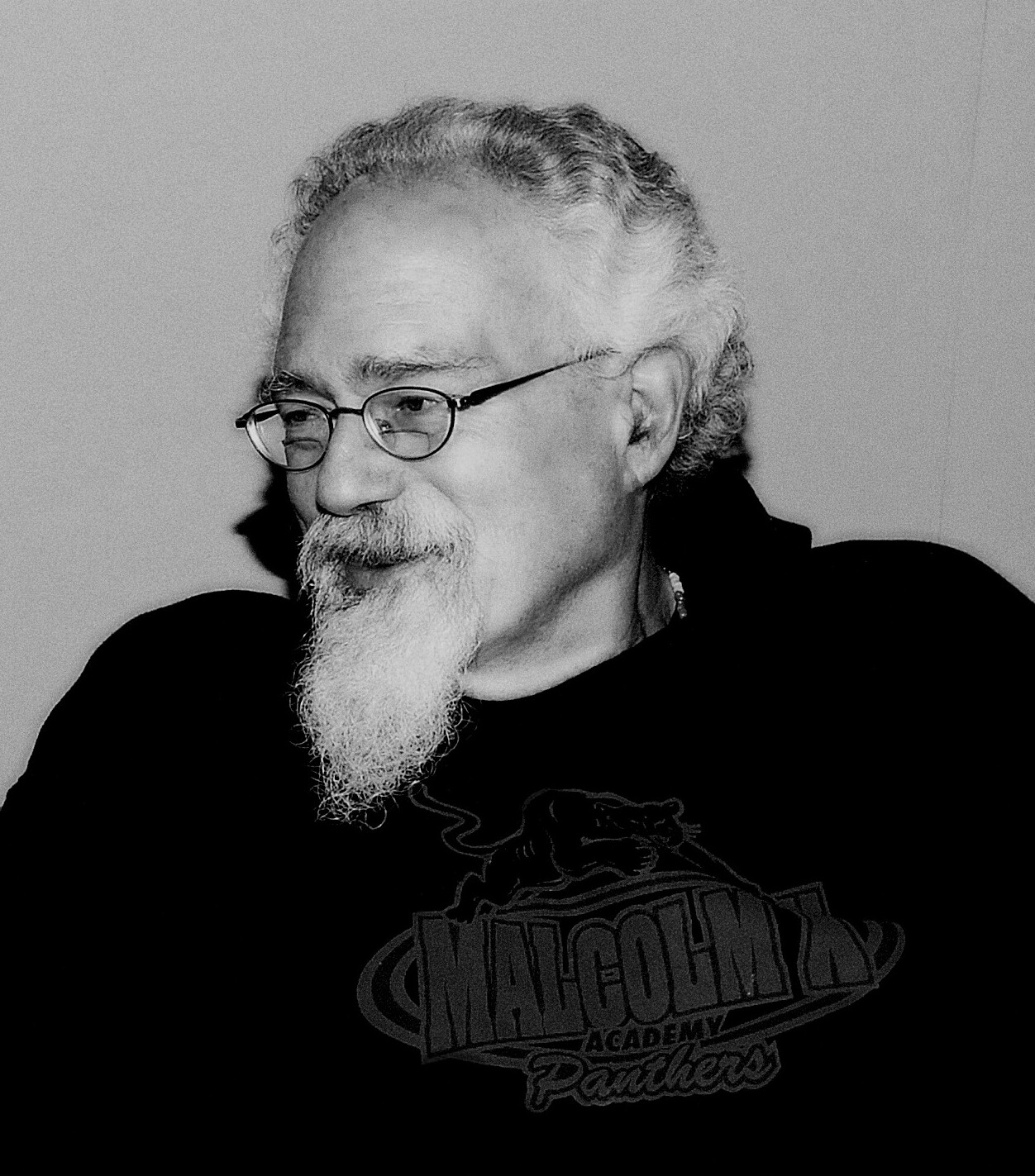
John Sinclair

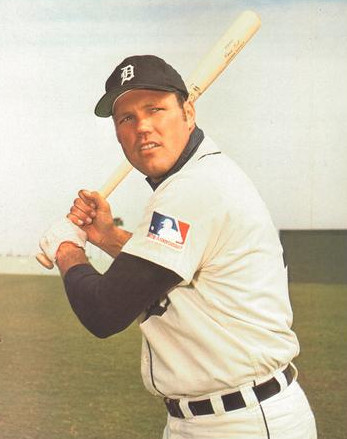
Bill Freehan

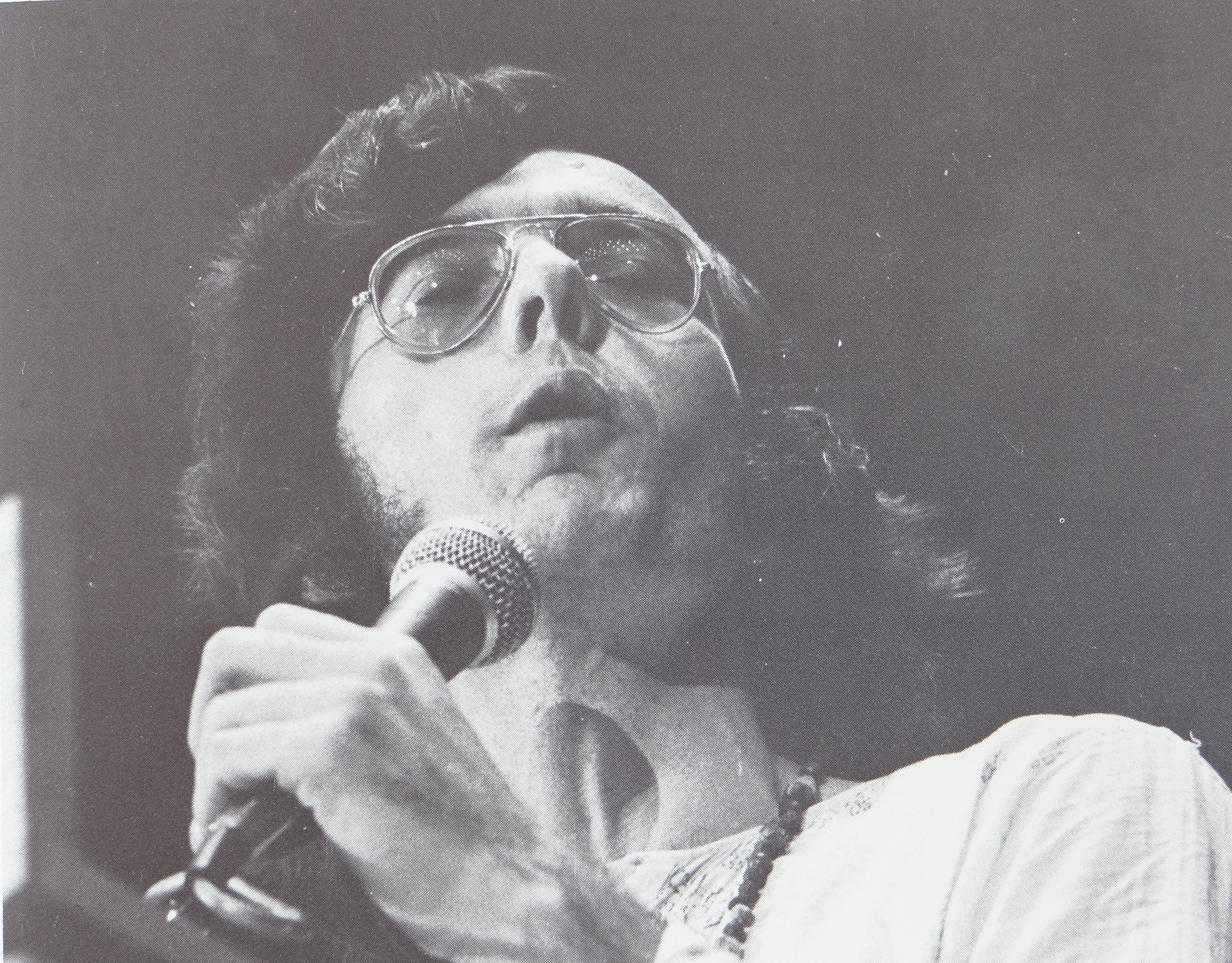
Rennie Davis

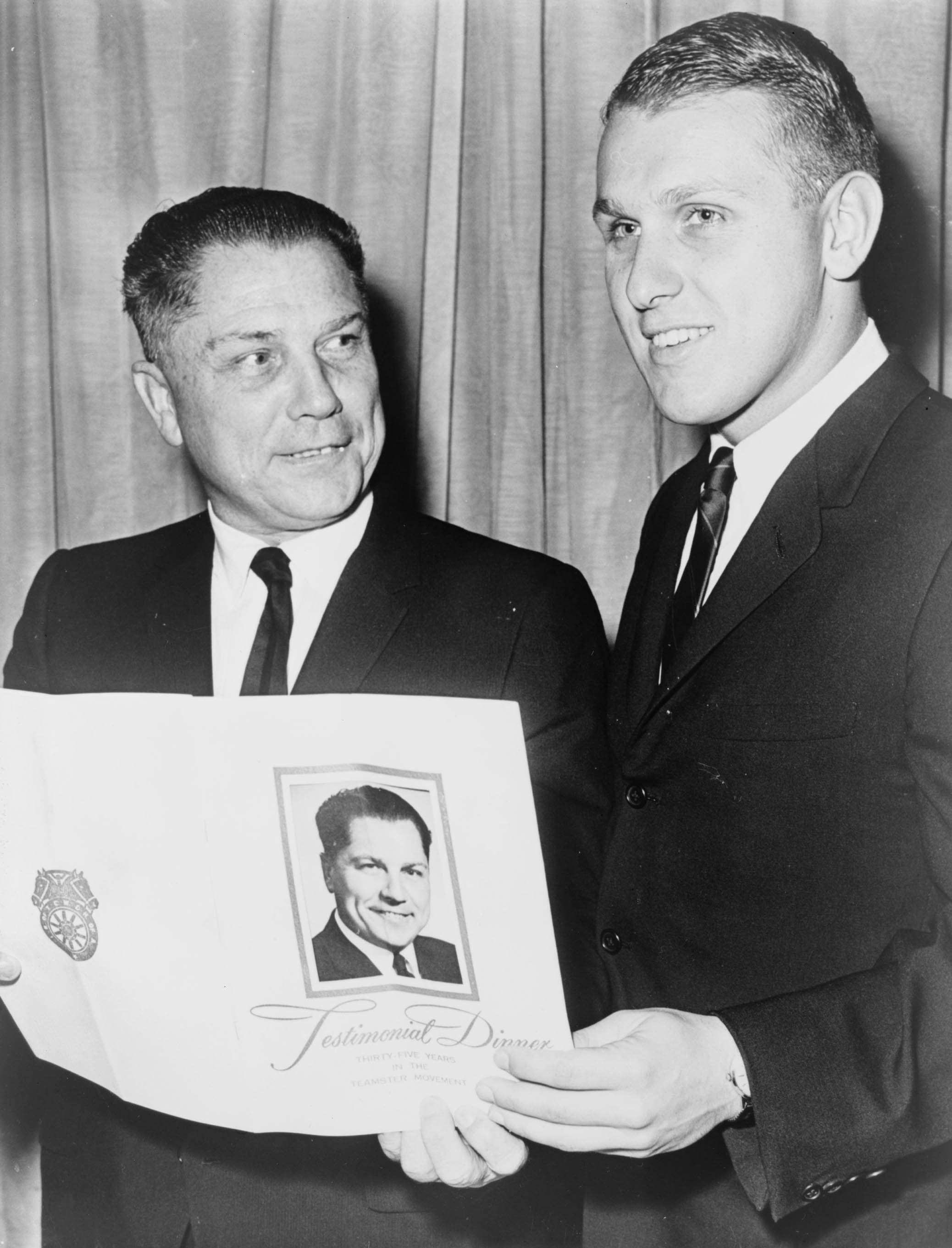
James P. Hoffa

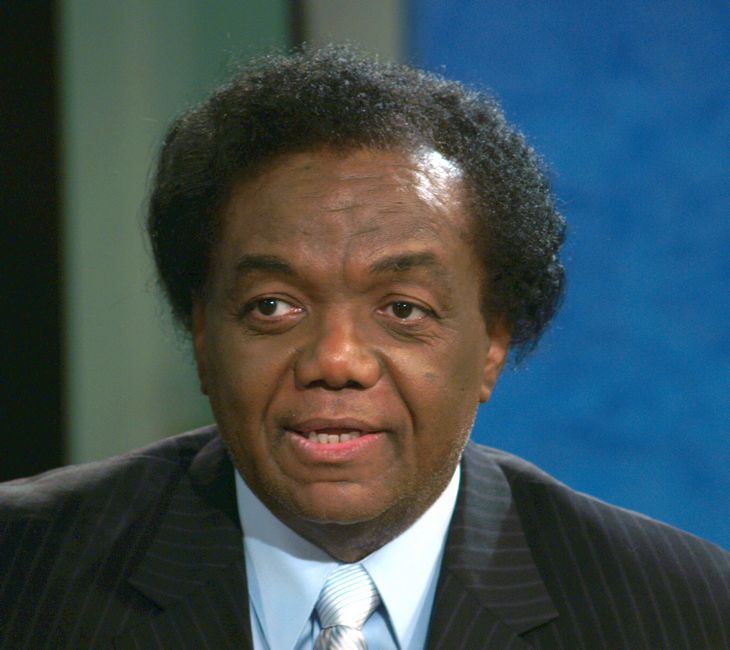
Lamont Dozier

== Deaths ==
- February 12 - William Barlum Thompson, Mayor of Detroit from 1907–1908 and 1911–1912, at age 81 in Detroit
- April 24 - John W. Haarer, Michigan State Treasurer (1913–1916), at age 65 in Jackson, Michigan
- November 8 - Philip Breitmeyer, Mayor of Detroit from 1909-1910 and a founder of Florists' Transworld Delivery (FTD), at age 77 in Detroit
- December 4 - John C. Ketcham, Republican Congressman from Michigan's 4th District from 1921 to 1933, at age 68 in Hastings, Michigan.

== See also ==
- History of Michigan
- History of Detroit
