= Governor Dickinson =

Governor Dickinson may refer to:

- John Dickinson (1732–1808), 5th President of Pennsylvania
- Luren Dickinson (1859–1943), 37th Governor of Michigan
