= Allen E. Stebbins =

American politician

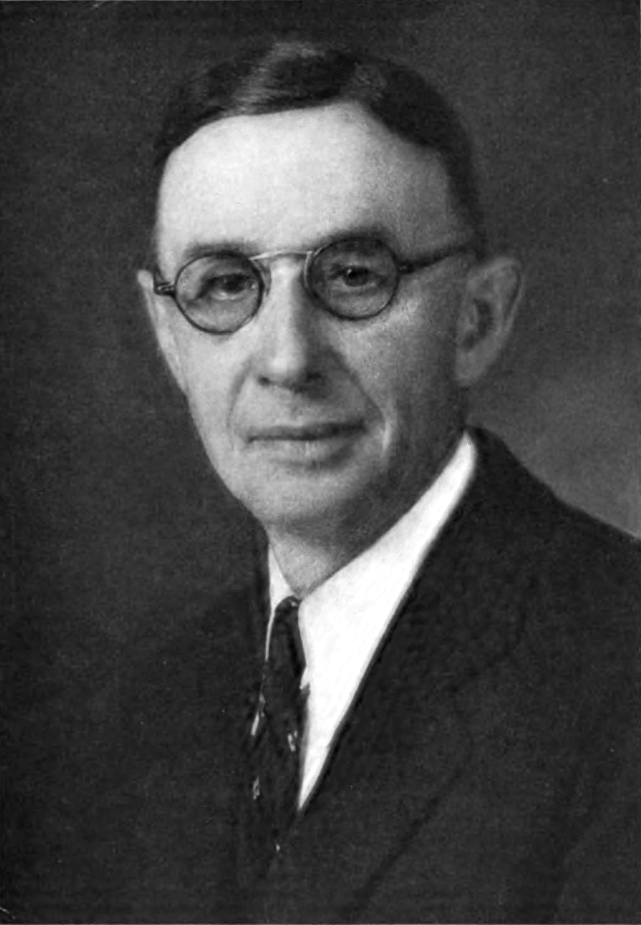

39th Lieutenant Governor of Michigan
- In office January 1, 1933 – January 1, 1935
- Governor: William Comstock
- Preceded by: Luren Dickinson
- Succeeded by: Thomas Read

Personal details
- Born: December 8, 1872 Easton Township, Michigan
- Died: January 25, 1941 (aged 68)
- Party: Democratic

Allen E. Stebbins (December 8, 1872 – January 25, 1941) was an American politician who served as the 39th lieutenant governor of Michigan from 1933 to 1935.
