= 1940 Michigan gubernatorial election =

- November 5, 1940
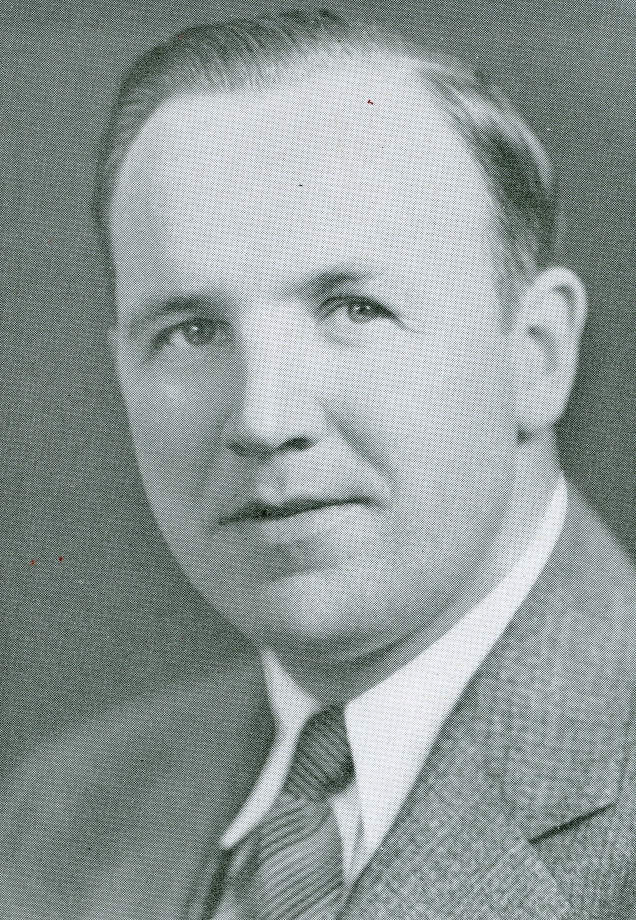

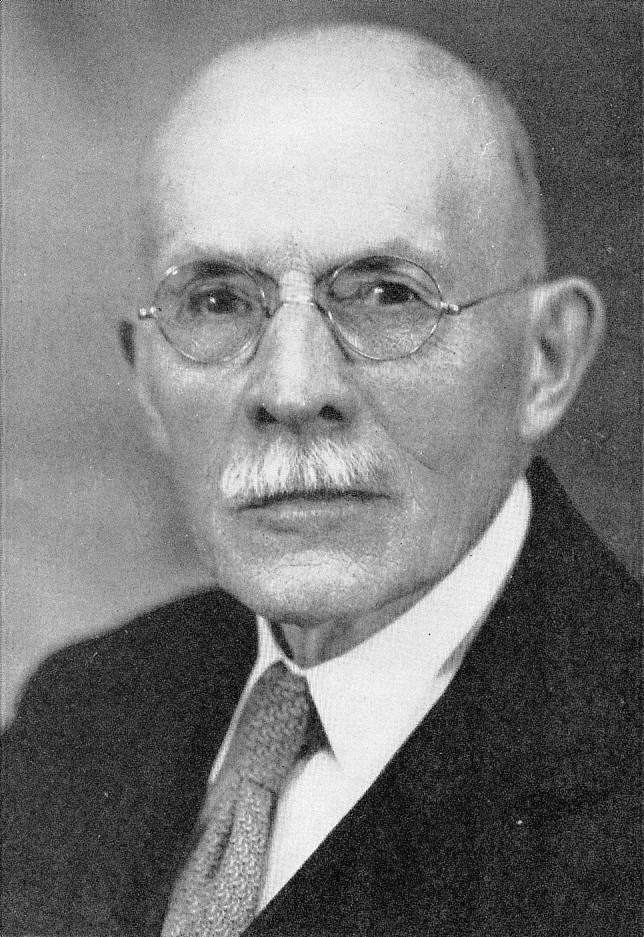
Nominee	Murray Van Wagoner	Luren Dickinson
Party	Democratic	Republican
Popular vote	1,077,065	945,784
Percentage	53.06%	46.59%
- County results Van Wagoner: 50–60% 60–70% Dickinson: 40–50% 50–60% 60–70% 70–80%
Governor before election
Luren Dickinson
Republican
Elected Governor
Murray Van Wagoner
Democratic

The 1940 Michigan gubernatorial election was held on November 5, 1940. Democratic nominee Murray Van Wagoner defeated incumbent Republican Luren Dickinson with 53.06% of the vote. This was the fifth of six consecutive gubernatorial elections in Michigan in which the incumbent party was defeated.

== Primary election ==
Michigan held primary elections on September 10, 1940.

=== Republican party ===
Luren Dickinson became governor in 1939 upon the death of Frank Fitzgerald. Dickinson secured the nomination for a full term against divided opposition.

==== Candidates ====
- Ernest T. Conlon, former member of Michigan Senate
- Luren Dickinson, incumbent governor
- Miller Dunckel, Michigan State Treasurer
- Melville B. McPherson, member of Michigan State Board of Agriculture
- Thomas Read, Michigan Attorney General
- Charles Renaud
- O. L. Smith, lawyer and former prosecutor

==== Results ====
Republican primary results
Party	Candidate	Votes	%
Republican	Luren Dickinson (inc.)	241,717	43.68%
Republican	Thomas Read	108,113	19.53%
Republican	O. L. Smith	92,236	16.67%
Republican	Miller Dunckel	62,874	11.36%
Republican	Melville B. McPherson	28,332	5.12%
Republican	Ernest T. Conlon	12,909	2.33%
Republican	Charles Renaud	7,226	1.31%
Republican	Scattering	31	0.01%
Total votes		553,438	100.00%

=== Democratic party ===
State Highway commissioner Murray Van Wagoner easily won the Democratic nomination.

==== Candidates ====
- Eugene Van Antwerp, member of Detroit City Council
- Murray Van Wagoner, State Highway Commissioner

==== Results ====
Democratic primary results
Party	Candidate	Votes	%
Democratic	Murray Van Wagoner	281,023	79.30%
Democratic	Eugene Van Antwerp	73,340	20.70%
Democratic	Scattering	12	0.00%
Total votes		354,375	100.00%

== General election ==
=== Candidates ===
Major party candidates

- Murray Van Wagoner, Democratic
- Luren Dickinson, Republican

Other candidates

- Seth Whitmore, Socialist
- Philip Raymond, Communist
- Ralph Naylor, Socialist Labor

=== Results ===
1940 Michigan gubernatorial election
Party	Candidate	Votes	%	±%
Democratic	Murray Van Wagoner	1,077,065	53.06%	+6.10%
Republican	Luren Dickinson (inc.)	945,784	46.59%	−6.19%
Socialist	Seth Whitmore	4,124	0.20%	+0.02%
Communist	Philip Raymond	2,387	0.12%	
Socialist Labor	Ralph Naylor	702	0.04%	+0.01%
	Scattering	7	0.00%	
Majority		131,281	6.47%	
Total votes		2,030,069	100.00%	
Democratic gain from Republican		Swing	+12.29%	

==== Results by county ====
After this election, Crawford County and Oakland County would not vote Democratic again until 1986.

County	Murray Van Wagoner Democratic		Luren Dickinson Republican		Seth Whitmore Socialist		Philip Raymond Communist		Ralph Naylor Socialist Labor		Margin		Total votes cast
County	#	%	#	%	#	%	#	%	#	%	#	%	Total votes cast
Alcona	908	37.03%	1,541	62.85%	3	0.12%	0	0.00%	0	0.00%	-633	-25.82%	2,452
Alger	3,044	66.55%	1,487	32.51%	3	0.07%	38	0.83%	2	0.04%	1,557	34.04%	4,574
Allegan	5,880	33.74%	11,527	66.15%	15	0.09%	3	0.02%	1	0.01%	-5,647	-32.41%	17,426
Alpena	3,858	46.42%	4,448	53.32%	4	0.05%	1	0.01%	0	0.00%	-590	-7.10%	8,311
Antrim	1,616	36.51%	2,805	63.38%	4	0.09%	1	0.02%	0	0.00%	-1,189	-26.86%	4,426
Arenac	1,503	40.07%	2,238	59.66%	5	0.13%	2	0.05%	3	0.08%	-735	-19.59%	3,751
Baraga	2,209	47.84%	2,386	51.68%	5	0.11%	17	0.37%	0	0.00%	-177	-3.83%	4,617
Barry	3,484	35.38%	6,350	64.48%	11	0.11%	1	0.01%	2	0.02%	-2,866	-29.10%	9,848
Bay	14,561	50.65%	14,156	49.24%	24	0.08%	2	0.01%	7	0.02%	405	1.41%	28,750
Benzie	1,583	43.42%	2,050	56.23%	11	0.30%	1	0.03%	1	0.03%	-467	-12.81%	3,646
Berrien	18,125	47.34%	20,075	52.44%	61	0.16%	4	0.01%	18	0.05%	-1,950	-5.09%	38,283
Branch	4,475	39.19%	6,931	60.69%	10	0.09%	3	0.03%	1	0.01%	-2,456	-21.51%	11,420
Calhoun	19,941	49.75%	19,967	49.81%	129	0.32%	34	0.08%	13	0.03%	-26	-0.06%	40,084
Cass	4,491	41.31%	6,364	58.54%	12	0.11%	4	0.04%	0	0.00%	-1,873	-17.23%	10,871
Charlevoix	2,356	42.05%	3,223	57.52%	23	0.41%	0	0.00%	1	0.02%	-867	-15.47%	5,603
Cheboygan	3,309	51.19%	3,144	48.64%	5	0.08%	5	0.08%	1	0.02%	165	2.55%	6,464
Chippewa	5,522	50.06%	5,492	49.79%	6	0.05%	10	0.09%	1	0.01%	30	0.27%	11,031
Clare	1,364	32.26%	2,855	67.53%	6	0.14%	3	0.07%	0	0.00%	-1,491	-35.26%	4,228
Clinton	3,268	29.84%	7,672	70.06%	9	0.08%	0	0.00%	1	0.01%	-4,404	-40.22%	10,950
Crawford	825	50.43%	807	49.33%	4	0.24%	0	0.00%	0	0.00%	18	1.10%	1,636
Delta	8,971	60.23%	5,862	39.36%	30	0.20%	29	0.19%	2	0.01%	3,109	20.87%	14,894
Dickinson	7,443	55.33%	5,963	44.33%	23	0.17%	21	0.16%	1	0.01%	1,480	11.00%	13,451
Eaton	6,009	38.74%	9,460	60.99%	40	0.26%	3	0.02%	0	0.00%	-3,451	-22.25%	15,512
Emmet	3,176	45.84%	3,744	54.03%	8	0.12%	0	0.00%	1	0.01%	-568	-8.20%	6,929
Genesee	49,748	57.05%	37,175	42.63%	173	0.20%	89	0.10%	12	0.01%	12,573	14.42%	87,197
Gladwin	1,399	35.06%	2,587	64.84%	3	0.08%	0	0.00%	1	0.03%	-1,188	-29.77%	3,990
Gogebic	9,052	58.55%	6,261	40.50%	52	0.34%	89	0.58%	7	0.05%	2,791	18.05%	15,461
Grand Traverse	3,607	41.82%	5,012	58.11%	5	0.06%	0	0.00%	0	0.00%	-1,405	-16.29%	8,625 (Note: Includes 1 Scattering vote)
Gratiot	4,222	34.12%	8,131	65.72%	18	0.15%	2	0.02%	0	0.00%	-3,909	-31.59%	12,373
Hillsdale	3,967	31.16%	8,745	68.70%	12	0.09%	2	0.02%	4	0.03%	-4,778	-37.53%	12,730
Houghton	11,807	54.94%	9,617	44.75%	12	0.06%	49	0.23%	5	0.02%	2,190	10.19%	21,490
Huron	3,575	27.54%	9,393	72.35%	13	0.10%	0	0.00%	2	0.02%	-5,818	-44.81%	12,983
Ingham	25,003	43.92%	31,653	55.60%	230	0.40%	16	0.03%	26	0.05%	-6,650	-11.68%	56,928
Ionia	5,814	39.79%	8,772	60.04%	24	0.16%	0	0.00%	1	0.01%	-2,958	-20.25%	14,611
Iosco	1,484	39.92%	2,228	59.94%	4	0.11%	1	0.03%	0	0.00%	-744	-20.02%	3,717
Iron	4,801	51.43%	4,483	48.02%	14	0.15%	37	0.40%	0	0.00%	318	3.41%	9,335
Isabella	3,312	34.45%	6,289	65.41%	6	0.06%	5	0.05%	2	0.02%	-2,977	-30.96%	9,615
Jackson	16,582	43.16%	21,748	56.61%	54	0.14%	27	0.07%	9	0.02%	-5,166	-13.45%	38,420
Kalamazoo	18,897	44.20%	23,773	55.60%	55	0.13%	16	0.04%	15	0.04%	-4,876	-11.40%	42,758 (Note: Includes 2 Scattering votes)
Kalkaska	847	45.78%	1,000	54.05%	3	0.16%	0	0.00%	0	0.00%	-153	-8.27%	1,850
Kent	49,019	48.95%	50,657	50.59%	367	0.37%	64	0.06%	25	0.02%	-1,638	-1.64%	100,132
Keweenaw	1,069	53.10%	936	46.50%	1	0.05%	6	0.30%	1	0.05%	133	6.61%	2,013
Lake	1,086	45.25%	1,311	54.63%	0	0.00%	2	0.08%	1	0.04%	-225	-9.38%	2,400
Lapeer	3,717	34.34%	7,096	65.55%	10	0.09%	0	0.00%	2	0.02%	-3,379	-31.21%	10,825
Leelanau	1,317	37.31%	2,210	62.61%	3	0.08%	0	0.00%	0	0.00%	-893	-25.30%	3,530
Lenawee	8,934	37.81%	14,657	62.03%	28	0.12%	5	0.02%	5	0.02%	-5,723	-24.22%	23,629
Livingston	3,829	37.29%	6,427	62.59%	12	0.12%	0	0.00%	1	0.01%	-2,598	-25.30%	10,269
Luce	1,156	45.00%	1,407	54.77%	2	0.08%	3	0.12%	0	0.00%	-251	-9.77%	2,569
Mackinac	2,167	47.22%	2,413	52.58%	8	0.17%	0	0.00%	1	0.02%	-246	-5.36%	4,589
Macomb	22,251	58.61%	15,598	41.09%	64	0.17%	36	0.09%	13	0.03%	6,653	17.53%	37,962
Manistee	4,432	50.43%	4,342	49.40%	13	0.15%	1	0.01%	1	0.01%	90	1.02%	8,789
Marquette	12,788	60.02%	8,472	39.76%	17	0.08%	24	0.11%	5	0.02%	4,316	20.26%	21,306
Mason	4,097	47.87%	4,434	51.81%	17	0.20%	8	0.09%	2	0.02%	-337	-3.94%	8,558
Mecosta	2,301	34.07%	4,444	65.81%	7	0.10%	0	0.00%	1	0.01%	-2,143	-31.73%	6,753
Menominee	6,319	57.56%	4,624	42.12%	28	0.26%	7	0.06%	0	0.00%	1,695	15.44%	10,978
Midland	3,983	40.14%	5,923	59.69%	15	0.15%	2	0.02%	0	0.00%	-1,940	-19.55%	9,923
Missaukee	1,032	32.35%	2,154	67.52%	4	0.13%	0	0.00%	0	0.00%	-1,122	-35.17%	3,190
Monroe	11,892	51.59%	11,136	48.31%	16	0.07%	6	0.03%	1	0.00%	756	3.28%	23,051
Montcalm	4,366	37.59%	7,216	62.12%	33	0.28%	1	0.01%	0	0.00%	-2,850	-24.54%	11,616
Montmorency	852	44.31%	1,067	55.49%	2	0.10%	0	0.00%	1	0.05%	-215	-11.18%	1,923
Muskegon	20,041	59.00%	13,821	40.69%	81	0.24%	24	0.07%	3	0.01%	6,220	18.31%	33,970
Newaygo	2,808	35.03%	5,190	64.75%	10	0.12%	7	0.09%	1	0.01%	-2,382	-29.72%	8,016
Oakland	51,980	54.61%	42,884	45.05%	210	0.22%	60	0.06%	56	0.06%	9,096	9.56%	95,190
Oceana	2,753	45.78%	3,246	53.98%	10	0.17%	2	0.03%	2	0.03%	-493	-8.20%	6,013
Ogemaw	1,365	37.45%	2,275	62.41%	5	0.14%	0	0.00%	0	0.00%	-910	-24.97%	3,645
Ontonagon	3,089	51.76%	2,789	46.73%	6	0.10%	83	1.39%	1	0.02%	300	5.03%	5,968
Osceola	1,731	30.24%	3,989	69.69%	4	0.07%	0	0.00%	0	0.00%	-2,258	-39.45%	5,724
Oscoda	467	44.06%	591	55.75%	2	0.19%	0	0.00%	0	0.00%	-124	-11.70%	1,060
Otsego	1,107	46.26%	1,280	53.49%	4	0.17%	0	0.00%	2	0.08%	-173	-7.23%	2,393
Ottawa	8,779	36.60%	15,150	63.17%	33	0.14%	9	0.04%	13	0.05%	-6,371	-26.56%	23,984
Presque Isle	2,720	53.47%	2,360	46.39%	6	0.12%	0	0.00%	1	0.02%	360	7.08%	5,087
Roscommon	803	39.00%	1,245	60.47%	11	0.53%	0	0.00%	0	0.00%	-442	-21.47%	2,059
Saginaw	24,171	48.89%	25,119	50.81%	110	0.22%	20	0.04%	15	0.03%	-948	-1.92%	49,435
Sanilac	2,702	22.04%	9,540	77.83%	13	0.11%	2	0.02%	1	0.01%	-6,838	-55.78%	12,258
Schoolcraft	2,276	53.91%	1,936	45.86%	9	0.21%	1	0.02%	0	0.00%	340	8.05%	4,222
Shiawassee	5,884	38.19%	9,488	61.59%	25	0.16%	4	0.03%	4	0.03%	-3,604	-23.39%	15,406
St. Clair	12,777	41.38%	18,068	58.51%	29	0.09%	1	0.00%	5	0.02%	-5,291	-17.13%	30,880
St. Joseph	5,249	35.74%	9,420	64.15%	13	0.09%	2	0.01%	1	0.01%	-4,171	-28.40%	14,685
Tuscola	3,787	28.57%	9,444	71.24%	22	0.17%	1	0.01%	2	0.02%	-5,657	-42.68%	13,256
Van Buren	6,037	36.10%	10,647	63.67%	24	0.14%	11	0.07%	4	0.02%	-4,610	-27.57%	16,723
Washtenaw	15,345	45.88%	18,000	53.82%	82	0.25%	12	0.04%	8	0.02%	-2,655	-7.94%	33,447
Wayne	459,320	65.21%	241,535	34.29%	1,630	0.23%	1,467	0.21%	383	0.05%	217,785	30.92%	704,335
Wexford	3,229	45.68%	3,829	54.17%	9	0.13%	1	0.01%	0	0.00%	-600	-8.49%	7,068
Total	1,077,065	53.06%	945,784	46.59%	4,124	0.20%	2,387	0.12%	702	0.03%	131,281	6.47%	2,030,069

===== Counties that flipped from Republican to Democratic =====
- Cheboygan
- Chippewa
- Crawford
- Genesee
- Iron
- Macomb
- Manistee
- Monroe
- Oakland
- Schoolcraft

===== Counties that flipped from Democratic to Republican =====
- Baraga
