= Leo J. Nowicki =

American politician

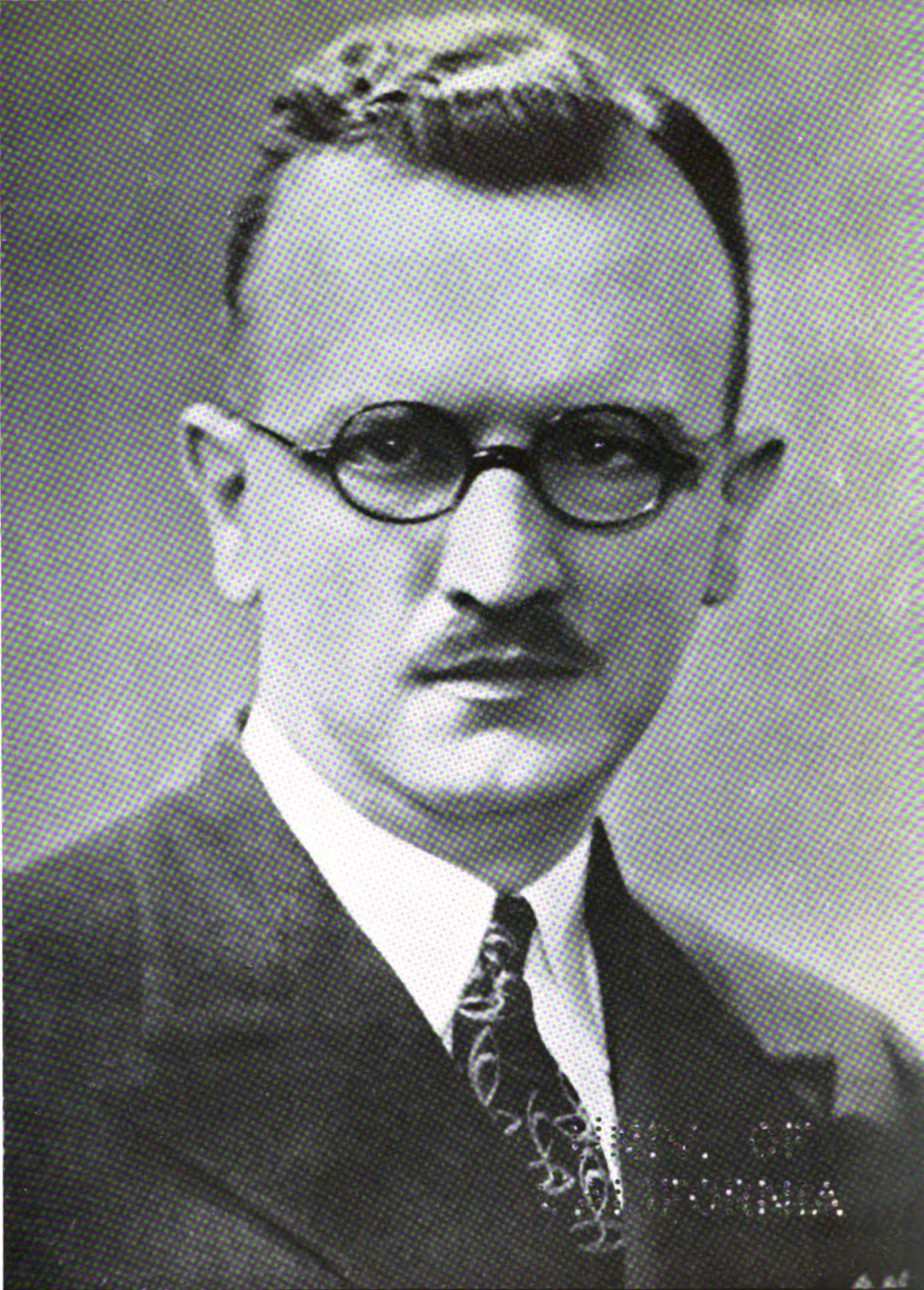

41st Lieutenant Governor of Michigan
- In office January 1, 1937 – January 1, 1939
- Governor: Frank Murphy
- Preceded by: Thomas Read
- Succeeded by: Luren Dickinson

Personal details
- Born: February 17, 1904; Giecz, Poland
- Died: September 5, 1990 (aged 86)
- Political party: Democratic

Leo J. Nowicki (February 17, 1904 – September 5, 1990) was an American politician who served as the 41st lieutenant governor of Michigan from 1937 to 1939.
