= Newman Ertell =

American basketball coach (1902–1985)

Biographical details
- Born: November 2, 1902
- Died: February 17, 1985 (aged 82); Detroit, Michigan, U.S.

Coaching career (HC unless noted)
- 1929–1948: Wayne

Head coaching record
- Overall: 183–135

Newman Hood Ertell (November 2, 1902 – February 17, 1985) was the head basketball coach at Wayne University (now Wayne State University) from 1929 through 1948.

== Early years ==
Ertell was born in 1902, the son of James and Marie Ertell. He grew up in Detroit and graduated from Northern High School (Detroit). He attended Detroit City College (later merged with other institutions to form Wayne University and later renamed Wayne State University). While attending Detroit City College, he played basketball and football for four years, was captain of the basketball team during the 1924–25 season, and also competed in track and swimming. He graduated from Detroit City College in 1925 and later received a master's degree from the University of Michigan in 1933.

== Wayne State coach and administrator ==
Ertell was hired as Wayne University's men's basketball coach in 1929. As coach, he scheduled games against top opponents and took his team to the NAIA basketball tournament in the late 1930s. He stepped down as basketball coach in September 1948. As Wayne's basketball coach, Ertell compiled a record variously reported as either 182–134, or 183–135. He was also an assistant coach to the football team for four years and later served as coach of the school's golf team.

Ertell remained active as the school's director of intramural sports, a position he assumed in 1930. He remained as director of intramural sports until he retired in June 1967. In all, he spent 37 years at Wayne.

== Later years ==
Ertell received the Willie Heston Award from the National Football Foundation's Detroit chapter in 1970. In 1977, Ertell was inducted into the Wayne State University Hall of Fame. He died in February 1985 at age 82.
