= Lloyd Brazil =

American basketball player-coach (1906–1965)

- Brazil from 1929 U. of D. yearbook

Biographical details
- Born: April 24, 1906; Bay City, Michigan, U.S.
- Died: April 3, 1965 (aged 58); Detroit, Michigan, U.S.

Playing career

Football
- 1927–1929: Detroit
- Position: Halfback

Coaching career (HC unless noted)

Football
- 1930–?: Detroit (assistant)

Basketball
- 1930–1946: Detroit

Baseball
- 1944–1952: Detroit
- 1955–1964: Detroit

Administrative career (AD unless noted)
- 1943–1951: Detroit

Head coaching record
- Overall: 184–118 (basketball); 222–144 (baseball)

Accomplishments and honors

Awards
- First-team All-American (1928); Third-team All-American (1929)

Francis Lloyd Brazil (April 24, 1906 – April 3, 1965) was an American athlete, coach and athletic director at the University of Detroit for 38 years. He played halfback for the University of Detroit football team from 1927 to 1929 and was selected as an All-American in 1928 and 1929. After graduating, he remained at the University of Detroit and spent his entire professional career there. He served as the head coach of the baseball and basketball teams, assistant coach of the football team, and director of athletics. He was inducted into the Michigan Sports Hall of Fame in 1961 and the University of Detroit Titans Hall of Fame in 1977.

== Biography ==
=== Early years ===
Brazil was a native of Bay City, Michigan, where his father once was a coal miner. He was a star athlete at Flint Central High School where he won ten varsity letters – four in football and three each in basketball and baseball. In two of his seasons at Flint Central, the school won the state football title, and "Brazil's stellar work played a major part in his team's successes."

=== Football player ===
After graduating from Flint Central in 1925, Brazil enrolled at the University of Detroit where Notre Dame's All-American quarterback Gus Dorais had taken over as head football coach. In the two years prior to Brazil's joining the team, Dorais' football teams at Detroit had compiled disappointing records of 5–4–0 (1925) and 3–6–0 (1926). Brazil joined the team in 1927, and Brazil led the team to a three-year record of 23–3–1 outscoring opponents 676 to 126. The best season was 1928 when he established an NCAA single-season record with 997 passing yards. He also led the 1928 Detroit team to a perfect 9–0 record, outscoring opponents 267 to 27. During Brazil's time with the team, Detroit compiled a 19-game winning streak that stands unmatched in school history.

During Detroit's undefeated season in 1928, Brazil received widespread media attention, as reflected in the following excerpt:

"One of the main reasons why the University of Detroit football team has been unbeaten and untied in its last fourteen starts (eight this season and six last season) is Lloyd Brazil, the blond halfback. Brazil, without a doubt, is one of the best backs of the year. If Detroit had had a more impressive schedule, he would be certain of a place on one or more of the all-American teams of 1928. As it is, Brazil probably will not be entirely overlooked. His work has been so consistently brilliant that he cannot escape attention."

Brazil carried the ball nearly 500 times for the University of Detroit and averaged more than eight yards per carry. He gained 5,861 yards during his three-year collegiate career. Brazil was also regarded as a fine passer, an outstanding defensive player, and "a vicious tackler and blocker." Brazil contributed to the team's success in so many ways that Dorais once remarked, "Brazil would be a valuable man to our team if he never touched the ball." Dorais later said, "As far as I'm concerned, there were only three great collegiate backs in my lifetime – Jim Thorpe, George Gipp and Lloyd Brazil."

In the 1940s, veteran Detroit sports columnist Watson Spoelstra wrote, "Brazil is one of the super athletes with a place among the best in Michigan history." An Associated Press profile of Brazil published in 1961 called him "the ideal football player," noting, "He had all the qualities necessary for success — speed, intelligence, desire and the instinct for doing the right thing at the right time."

An earlier profile of Brazil published by the Associated Press in 1928 focused on his diverse talents:

"'Braz,' as he's known to followers of the Tiger aggregation, is one of those triple threat fellows—a runner, passer and kicker. Brazil has a peculiar loping style of covering ground ... He can shift like a flash either way, sidestep onrushing tacklers with the best and uses the straight arm with telling effect. He's especially brilliant on returning punts in the open. 'Braz' also shines as a pass thrower and receiver. But his forte is punting."

Another profile of Brazil published during the 1928 season also focused on his abilities as a rusher, passer, blocker and tackler:

"Brazil can do everything that a first class back is supposed to do and do each of them with exceptional skill. Schooled as it is by one of the early masters of the forward pass, Charles E. Dorais of Notre Dame, Detroit uses a wide variety of passes. Brazil is on the throwing end of nearly all of them, cool, deliberate, accurate. He does the team's punting and more than his share of carrying the ball. ... An elusive runner, he can be used with success on any type of running play, around the ends, off the tackles, or thru the line. But Brazil is more than a spectacular player. He is a superb interferer, a strong blocker and tackler, one of the best defensive backs of the year."

=== Other sports and Hall of Fame ===
Brazil also played basketball for the University of Detroit, and though he was also rated as a good baseball player, the school had no baseball program.

Brazil was inducted into the Michigan Sports Hall of Fame in 1961 and the University of Detroit Titans Hall of Fame in 1977.

=== Coach and athletic administrator ===
After graduating in 1930, Brazil declined an offer to play professional baseball and instead accepted a position as Dorais’ assistant at the University of Detroit. Brazil remained at the school until his death in 1965. Over the next 35 years, Brazil served in many capacities as athletic director, business manager of athletics, head baseball coach, head basketball coach, backfield coach to the football team, and chairman of the Athletic Board of Control. He also served for a time as the president of the Missouri Valley Conference. Brazil was promoted to athletic director in 1943 when Dorais stepped down to take over as head coach of the Detroit Lions. At the time, one newspaper noted that the "hustling" new athletic director "would be somewhat of a one-man gang in the Detroit front office," having responsibilities as athletic director, graduate manager, business manager, ticket manager and also basketball coach. Veteran sports writer E. A. Batchelor paid this tribute to Brazil: "No boy ever was exposed to him without being the better for the experience."

==== Basketball coach ====
Brazil served as the University of Detroit's head basketball coach for sixteen years from 1930 to 1946. From 1935 to 1939, Brazil's basketball teams were among the best in the Midwest compiling a three-year record of 54–19. His best season as head coach was 1937–38 when the Detroit basketball team compiled a 16–4 (80.0%) record. In sixteen seasons under Brazil, the University of Detroit basketball team had a .625 winning record.

The University of Detroit's year-by-year record in Brazil's sixteen years as coach is set forth below:

- 1930–31: 10–9
- 1931–32: 8–8
- 1932–33: 12–5
- 1933–34: 7–8
- 1934–35: 4–10
- 1935–36: 12–5
- 1936–37: 11–5
- 1937–38: 16–4
- 1938–39: 15–5
- 1939–40: 14–9
- 1940–41: 11–10
- 1941–42: 13–8
- 1942–43: 15–5
- 1943–44: 13–7
- 1944–45: 8–12
- 1945–46: 15–8

==== Baseball coach ====
Brazil also served as the head baseball coach at the University of Detroit for 20 years from 1945 until his death in 1965. In the 1950s, his Titan baseball teams drew national attention. In April 1960, Brazil decided to start the baseball season as scheduled despite "Decemberish weather" with snow "falling in mushy blobs." When the game was called after two-and-a-half hours and seven innings, Detroit's pitcher, Gary Mettie, had pitched a no-hitter. When the Detroit team was batting, Mettie slipped into a nearby building to keep warm.

=== Death and family ===
In March 1965, Brazil was seriously injured while driving his automobile on a street near the University of Detroit. The vehicle skidded in a pile of snow and hit a tree. Brazil was thrown into the dashboard and suffered fractured ribs, facial and other injuries. Brazil was reported to be in good condition, but his condition deteriorated the following week. Doctors performed a tracheotomy in an effort to aid his breathing, but an electro-cardiogram revealed a blood clot. Brazil had suffered a stroke 12 years earlier. Brazil died days before he was to have started his 20th year as the school's head baseball coach.

== See also ==
- List of NCAA major college football yearly passing leaders
- 1928 College Football All-America Team
- 1929 College Football All-America Team
