= Luren Dickinson =

American politician (1859–1943)

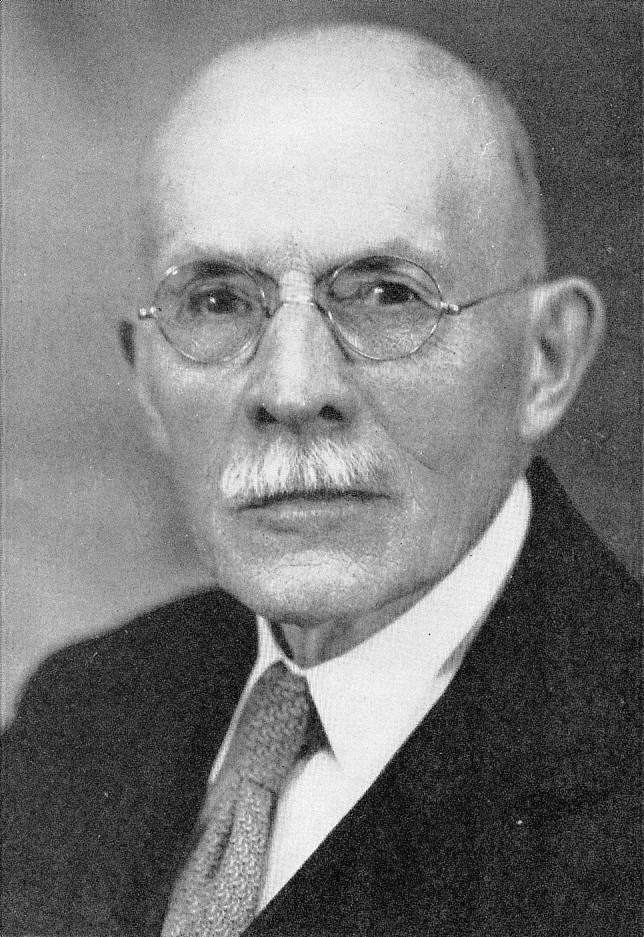

37th Governor of Michigan
- In office March 16, 1939 – January 1, 1941
- Lieutenant: Matilda Dodge Wilson
- Preceded by: Frank Fitzgerald
- Succeeded by: Murray Van Wagoner

35th, 38th, and 42nd Lieutenant Governor of Michigan
- In office January 1, 1939 – March 16, 1939
- Governor: Frank Fitzgerald
- Preceded by: Leo J. Nowicki
- Succeeded by: Matilda Dodge Wilson
- In office January 1, 1927 – January 1, 1933
- Governor: Fred W. Green; Wilber M. Brucker
- Preceded by: George W. Welsh
- Succeeded by: Allen E. Stebbins
- In office January 1, 1915 – January 1, 1921
- Governor: Woodbridge N. Ferris; Albert Sleeper
- Preceded by: John Q. Ross
- Succeeded by: Thomas Read

Member of the Michigan Senate from the 15th district
- In office 1909–1910
- Preceded by: Karl D. Keyes
- Succeeded by: Coleman C. Vaughn

Member of the Michigan House of Representatives
- In office 1897–1898
- Preceded by: Giles B. Allen
- Succeeded by: Lyman H. McCall
- Constituency: 2nd Eaton district
- In office 1905–1908
- Preceded by: Cornelius A. Hallenbeck
- Succeeded by: Will E. Hale
- Constituency: Eaton County

Personal details
- Born: April 15, 1859 Niagara County, New York, U.S.
- Died: April 22, 1943 (aged 84) Charlotte, Michigan, U.S.
- Party: Republican
- Spouse: Zora Della Cooley

Luren Dudley Dickinson (April 15, 1859 – April 22, 1943) was an American politician. He served as the 37th governor of Michigan from 1939 to 1941. He holds the record of the oldest person to ever serve as Michigan governor, beginning at the age of 79 and leaving office at the age of 81.

== Early life ==
Dickinson was born in Niagara County, New York, son of Daniel Dickinson (1828–1903) and Hannah Elisabeth Dickinson (née Leavens; 1830–1916); as an infant his family moved to Michigan. In Michigan his family purchased land and undertook farming. As a boy Dickinson spent most of his time working on the family farm but by studying often at home he was able to complete high school and at the age of eighteen qualified to be a teacher. He was impressive as a teacher and thus moved up quickly becoming first principal and then superintendent of schools at the age of 21. In 1888, he married Zora Della Cooley and they had one child by adoption - Rilla Ethel Patterson (née Dickinson), grandson Robert Patterson, and granddaughter Della Patterson, the latter would accompany the Governor while in office.

== Politics ==
Dickinson's involvement in community schools sparked his interest in local politics. He joined the Republican Party, was elected to the Michigan State House of Representatives and served from 1897 to 1898 and from 1905 to 1908. He was then elected to the Michigan Senate and served from 1909 to 1910.

After his one term in the State Senate, Dickinson was elected the 35th lieutenant governor of Michigan in 1914 and later re-elected to this office. He would spend most of the rest of his political career as lieutenant governor, being elected to the post seven times and defeated three times (1924, 1932, and 1936). He was also an unsuccessful candidate in the Republican primary for governor in 1920 against Alex Groesbeck, who was successful in the general election. Dickinson served as Lieutenant Governor under five governors: Woodbridge N. Ferris, 1915–17; Albert Sleeper, 1917–21; Fred W. Green, 1927–29; Wilber Marion Brucker, 1929–33; and Frank Fitzgerald, 1939.

== Gubernatorial succession ==
In 1939, incumbent Governor Frank Fitzgerald died suddenly in office and thus, a month short of Dickinson's 80th birthday, he became Governor of Michigan.

As governor, he spent much of his time conducting state business at his farm near Charlotte, Michigan rather than at the state capital in Lansing. He was well known for his informal appearance and actions which included having his swearing in ceremony at his farm, dressing in modest clothing and continuing to undertake farm work during his term. During his twenty one and a half months in office, a law was passed which made it mandatory for public school teachers to take an oath of loyalty to the government. Also during his term, gambling and open bars were contested and the Michigan National Guard was activated for service in World War II.

In 1940, he ran for a full term but his campaigning was hampered due to the illness and later death of his wife. He lost the election to Democrat Murray Van Wagoner.

== Death ==
Dickinson was a member of the Grange and Knights of Pythias. He died two years after leaving office at the age of eighty-four in Charlotte and is buried at the Maple Hill Cemetery of that town.

== Sources ==
- National Governors Association via web.archive.org
- The Political Graveyard
- Former Lt. Governors of Michigan, Michigan.gov
- Biography of Dickinson, stapor.com

Party political offices
Preceded by Frank Fitzgerald	Republican nominee for Governor of Michigan; 1940	Succeeded by Harry Kelly
Political offices
Preceded by John Q. Ross	Lieutenant Governor of Michigan; 1915–1921	Succeeded by Thomas Read
Preceded by George W. Welsh	Lieutenant Governor of Michigan; 1927–1933	Succeeded by Allen E. Stebbins
Preceded by Leo J. Nowicki	Lieutenant Governor of Michigan; 1939	Succeeded by Matilda Dodge Wilson
Preceded by Frank Fitzgerald	Governor of Michigan; 1939–1941	Succeeded by Murray Van Wagoner
