= Thomas Read (politician) =

American politician (1881–1962)

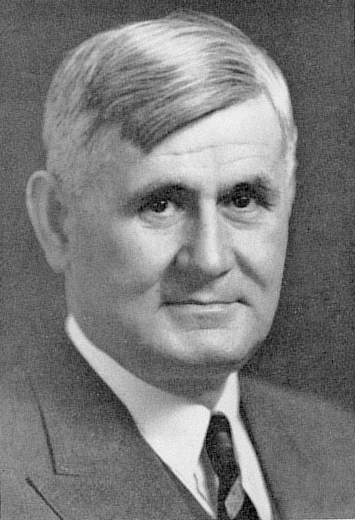

44th Speaker of the Michigan House of Representatives
- In office January 1, 1919 – December 31, 1920
- Governor: Albert E. Sleeper
- Preceded by: Wayne R. Rice
- Succeeded by: Fred L. Warner

Member of the Michigan House of Representatives from the Oceana County district
- In office January 1, 1915 – December 31, 1920
- Succeeded by: Daniel Rankin

36th & 40th Lieutenant Governor of Michigan
- In office January 1, 1935 – January 1, 1937
- Governor: Frank D. Fitzgerald
- Preceded by: Allen E. Stebbins
- Succeeded by: Leo J. Nowicki
- In office January 1, 1921 – January 1, 1925
- Governor: Alex J. Groesbeck
- Preceded by: Luren Dickinson
- Succeeded by: George W. Welsh

41st Michigan Attorney General
- In office January 1, 1939 – January 1, 1941
- Governor: Frank Fitzgerald; Luren Dickinson
- Preceded by: Raymond Wesley Starr
- Succeeded by: Herbert J. Rushton

Member of the Michigan Senate from the 26th district
- In office January 1, 1927 – December 31, 1928
- Preceded by: Orville E. Atwood
- Succeeded by: Orville E. Atwood

Personal details
- Born: May 28, 1881 Rochester, New York
- Died: April 7, 1962 (aged 80) Kalamazoo, Michigan
- Party: Republican
- Spouse: Ethel
- Profession: Attorney

Thomas Read (May 28, 1881 – April 7, 1962) was a Republican politician from Michigan who served in the Michigan House of Representatives including as its Speaker during the 50th Legislature, as the lieutenant governor of Michigan under Alex J. Groesbeck, as a member of the Michigan State Senate, and as Michigan Attorney General.

Born in Rochester, New York, of English and Scottish ancestry to Thomas and Jane Read on May 28, 1881, Read was either a candidate for or served in nearly all state-level offices in Michigan (he was never a candidate for or elected Secretary of State). He was a candidate in the primary for Governor of Michigan in 1924, losing to Alex J. Groesbeck, and 1940, losing to Luren Dickinson.

Read was a presidential elector for Michigan in 1928, casting a ballot for Herbert Hoover, and a delegate to the 1940 Republican National Convention in Philadelphia which nominated Wendell Willkie (who eventually lost to Franklin D. Roosevelt. Senator Arthur H. Vandenberg of Michigan was a candidate for the nomination at that convention.

Read died after surgery at a hospital in Kalamazoo, Michigan in 1962. The elementary school in his hometown of Shelby is named for Read.

Political offices
Preceded by Luren D. Dickinson	Lieutenant Governor of Michigan; 1921–1925	Succeeded by George W. Welsh
Preceded by Allen E. Stebbins	Lieutenant Governor of Michigan; 1935–1936	Succeeded by Leo J. Nowicki
Legal offices
Preceded by Raymond Wesley Starr	Michigan Attorney General; 1939–1940	Succeeded by Herbert J. Rushton
