= Ron Finch =

American football and basketball coach

Biographical details
- Born: October 19, 1902
- Died: April 19, 1962 (aged 59); Mount Pleasant, Michigan, U.S.

Coaching career (HC unless noted)

Football
- 1937–1946: Central Michigan

Basketball
- 1943–1944: Central Michigan

Administrative career (AD unless noted)
- 1937–1942: Central Michigan

Head coaching record
- Overall: 54–18–1 (college football); 10–6 (college basketball)

Ronald W. Finch (October 19, 1902 – April 19, 1962) was an American football and basketball coach. He served as the head football coach at Central Michigan University from 1937 to 1946, compiling a record of 54–18–1. Finch was also the head basketball coach at Central Michigan for one season in 1943–44, tallying a mark of 10–6. Before coming to Central Michigan Finch taught and coached football at several high schools in the state of Michigan. He retired from coaching following the 1946 season and served as a dean at Central Michigan until his death in 1962.

== Head coaching record ==
=== College football ===
Year	Team	Overall	Conference	Standing	Bowl/playoffs
Central Michigan Bearcats/Chippewas (Independent) (1937–1946)
1937	Central Michigan	6–2			
1938	Central Michigan	7–1			
1939	Central Michigan	8–1			
1940	Central Michigan	4–3–1			
1941	Central Michigan	4–3			
1942	Central Michigan	6–0			
1943	Central Michigan	2–3			
1944	Central Michigan	5–2			
1945	Central Michigan	6–1			
1946	Central Michigan	6–2			
Central Michigan:		54–18–1			
Total:		54–18–1			
