= Walter C. Sadler =

American politician

Walter Clifford Sadler (1891–1959) was a politician and academic from Ann Arbor, Michigan. He served two terms as mayor of Ann Arbor, from 1937 to 1941, and was elected unopposed in 1939. He was on the faculty at the University of Michigan where he was the faculty adviser for the Sigma Pi fraternity chapter.

His book publications included The specifications and law on engineering works, Legal Aspects of Engineering, The proposed relocation of railroad facilities in Richmond, California, Industrial law, and Selected cases on partnership.

Preceded by Robert A. Campbell	Mayor of Ann Arbor, Michigan; 1937–1941	Succeeded by Leigh J. Young
