= Senator Thurber =

Senator Thurber may refer to:

- Jefferson G. Thurber (1807–1857), Michigan State Senate
- Samuel H. Thurber (1827–1870), Wisconsin State Senate
