= Harry Shaw =

Harry Shaw may refer to:

- Harry Shaw (footballer) (1905–1984), English footballer who played for Sunderland as a full back
- Harry Shaw (ice hockey) (born 1943), retired Canadian professional ice hockey defenceman
- Harry Straw, founder of Shaw Industries, Inc.
- Harry Shaw-Reynolds, drums player with the Melbourne jazz quartet The Conglomerate

== See also ==
- Harold Shaw (disambiguation)
- Henry Shaw (disambiguation)
