= Martin R. Bradley =

American politician

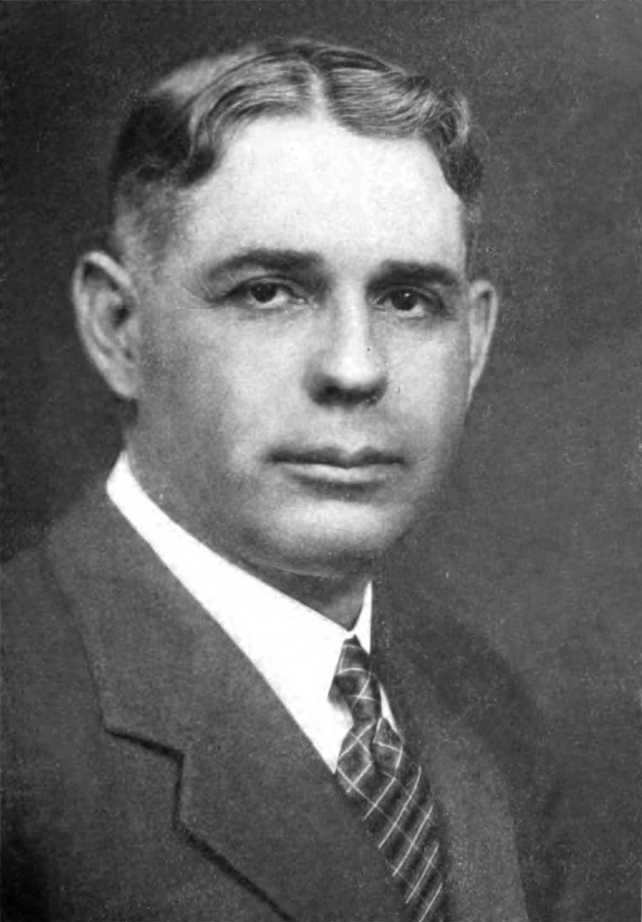

50th Speaker of the Michigan House of Representatives
- In office January 4, 1933 – December 31, 1934
- Preceded by: Fred R. Ming
- Succeeded by: George A. Schroeder

Member of the Michigan House of Representatives from the Menominee district
- In office January 1, 1927 – December 31, 1934
- In office January 1, 1923 – December 31, 1924

Personal details
- Born: April 1, 1888 Newberry, Michigan
- Died: December 21, 1975 (aged 87) Leavenworth, Washington
- Party: Democratic
- Spouse: Jennie

Martin R. Bradley (April 1, 1888 – December 21, 1975) was a Democratic politician from Michigan who served in the Michigan House of Representatives, including as Speaker during the 57th Legislature. He was the first Speaker to come from the Upper Peninsula and sponsored the legislation which created the Michigan Legislative Council (as Speaker, he served as its first chairman).

Prior to his election to the House, Bradley was a school teacher in Huron County, later moving to Hermansville and serving as the superintendent of schools and as postmaster. He was also a delegate to the 1932 Democratic National Convention which nominated Franklin D. Roosevelt for President of the United States. In 1935, Bradley was appointed the customs collector for Michigan and made his home in Detroit.

Bradley died on December 21, 1975, in Leavenworth, Washington.
