= Sullivan M. Cutcheon =

American politician (1833–1900)

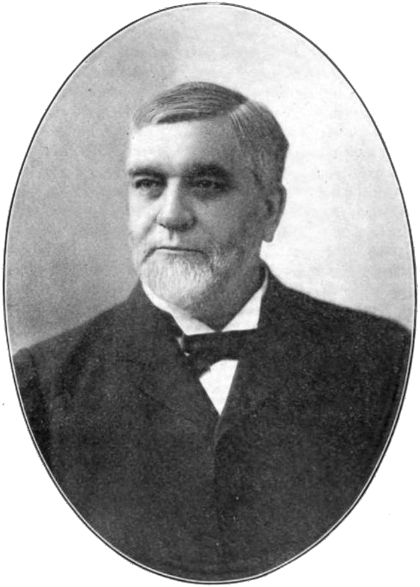

United States Attorney for the Eastern District of Michigan
- In office 1877–1885
- President: Rutherford B. Hayes

Speaker of the Michigan House of Representatives
- In office January 7, 1863 – 1864
- Preceded by: Dexter Mussey
- Succeeded by: Gilbert E. Read

Member of the Michigan House of Representatives from the Washtenaw County 1st district
- In office January 1, 1861 – 1864

Personal details
- Born: October 4, 1833 Pembroke, New Hampshire, US
- Died: April 18, 1900 (aged 66) Ypsilanti, Michigan, US
- Party: Republican
- Spouse: Josephine Louise Moore
- Children: 2

Sullivan M. Cutcheon (October 4, 1833 – April 18, 1900) was a Michigan politician, lawyer, and banker.

== Early life ==
Cutcheon was born on October 4, 1833, in Pembroke, New Hampshire, to Reverend James and Hannah M. Cutcheon.

== Career ==
Cutcheon was admitted to the bar in 1860. Cutcheon served as a member of the Michigan House of Representatives from the Washtenaw County 1st district from 1861 to 1864. During his last term, he served as the Speaker of the Michigan House of Representatives. Cutcheon was a delegate to the Republican National Convention from Michigan in 1868. In 1873, was appointed to the Michigan constitutional commission and served as its chairman. Cutcheon was the United States Attorney for the Eastern District of Michigan from 1877 to 1885. Cutcheon was the president of multiple banks over the course of his life, the Dime Savings Bank in 1884 and the Ypsilanti Savings Bank in 1892.

== Personal life ==
Cutcheon married Josephine Louise Moore on December 8, 1859. Together, they had two children. Cutcheon was Presbyterian.

== Death ==
Cutcheon died on April 18, 1900, in Ypsilanti, Michigan.
