= Fred R. Ming =

American politician

Frederick R. Ming
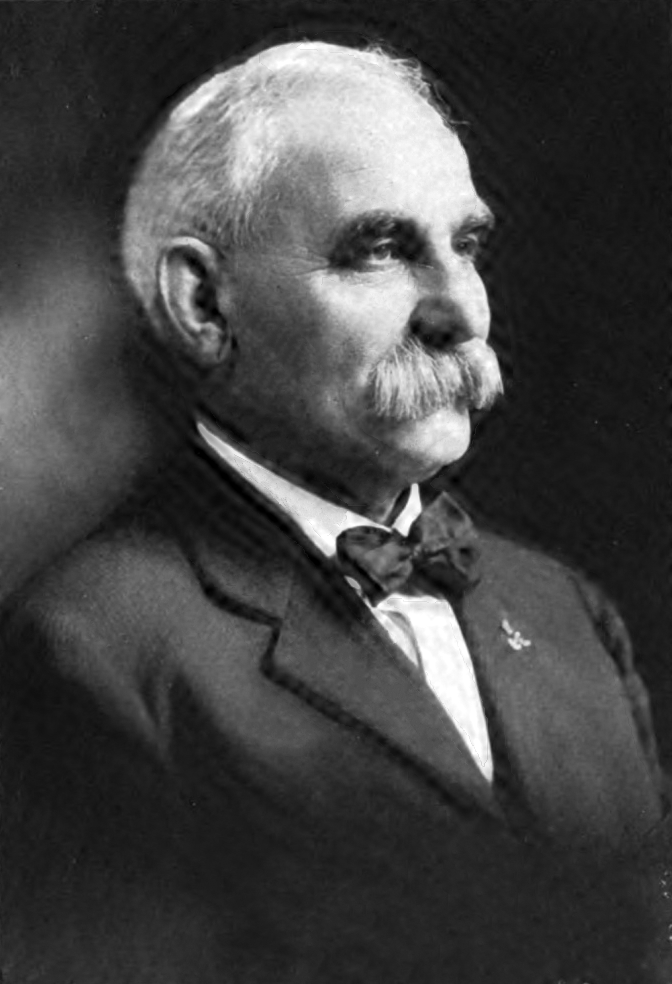

49th Speaker of the Michigan House of Representatives
- In office January 2, 1929 – December 31, 1932
- Preceded by: Lynn C. Gardner
- Succeeded by: Martin R. Bradley

Member of the U.S. House of Representatives from 's Cheboygan district
- In office January 1, 1925 – December 31, 1932
- Preceded by: District created
- Succeeded by: Ernest E. Faircloth

Member of the Michigan House of Representatives from the Cheboygan County district
- In office January 1, 1923 – December 31, 1924
- Preceded by: Frank B. Aldrich
- Succeeded by: County constituency abolished
- In office January 1, 1905 – December 31, 1906
- Preceded by: George D. Richards
- Succeeded by: Herbert F. Baker

Member of the Michigan Senate from the 29th district
- In office January 1, 1907 – December 31, 1910
- Preceded by: William L. Curtis
- Succeeded by: Frank D. Scott

Cheboygan County Sheriff
- In office 1901–1902

Personal details
- Born: October 13, 1865 Rochester, New York
- Died: February 22, 1943 (aged 77)
- Resting place: Pine Hill Cemetery, Cheboygan, Michigan
- Party: Republican
- Spouse(s): Adeline (1888-1902); Sadie

Frederick R. Ming (1865-1943) was a Republican politician from Michigan who served in both houses of the Michigan Legislature, including as Speaker of the House during the 55th and 56th Legislatures. Ming was also a candidate in the primary for Lieutenant Governor of Michigan in 1934, losing to Thomas Read who was eventually elected with Governor Frank Fitzgerald.

Ming's parents, Henry and Mary, were born in Germany and came to the United States in 1859, settling in Oswego, New York. Ming became an orphan at the age of 13, after his father's death in 1877, and worked as a farm hand an in a cheese factory in New York. He moved to Cheboygan in July 1880 where he worked in a sawmill and later became a teacher. Ming also attended the Ontario Veterinary College and became a veterinarian, as his father had been.
