= Henry Shaw =

Henry Shaw may refer to:

- Henry Shaw (antiquary) (1800–1873), English architectural draughtsman, engraver, and illuminator
- Henry Shaw (cricketer) (1854–1932), English cricketer
- Henry Shaw (Massachusetts politician) (1788–1857), congressman from Massachusetts
- Henry Shaw (philanthropist) (1800–1889), founder of the Missouri Botanical Garden
- Henry Shaw (taxidermist) (1812–1887), English taxidermist
- Henry M. Shaw (1819–1864), congressman from North Carolina
- Henry Shaw (accountant) (1850–1928), New Zealand accountant, bibliophile and politician
- Henry A. Shaw (1818-1891), Michigan politician
- Josh Billings (1818–1885), pen name of Henry Wheeler Shaw

== See also ==
- Harry Shaw (disambiguation)
