= Wayne R. Rice =

American politician

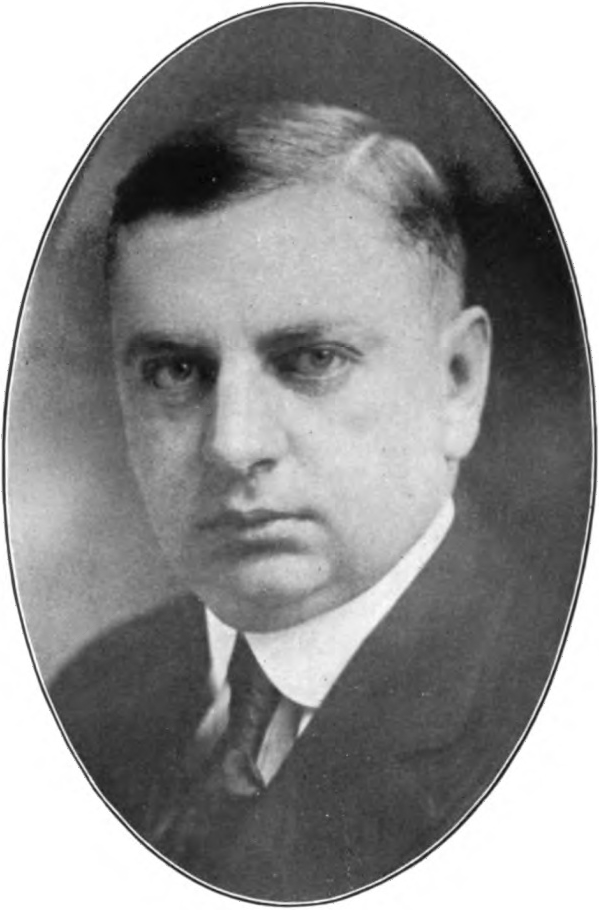

Speaker of the Michigan House of Representatives
- In office January 3, 1917 – 1918
- Preceded by: Charles Wallace Smith
- Succeeded by: Thomas Read

Member of the Michigan House of Representatives from the Newaygo County district
- In office January 1, 1913 – 1918

Personal details
- Born: July 26, 1885 Plainfield Township, Kent County, Michigan, US
- Died: June 7, 1945 (aged 59)
- Party: Republican
- Education: University of Michigan

Wayne Remington Rice (July 26, 1885 – June 7, 1945) was a lawyer and state legislator in Michigan. He served in the Michigan House of Representatives including as Speaker.

== Early life ==
Rice was born on a farm in Plainfield Township, Kent County, Michigan on July 26, 1885 to parents Nathaniel and Adelia Rice. Rice was of Irish ancestry.

== Career ==
Rice practiced law in White Cloud, Michigan. Rice served as Newaygo County Circuit Court Commissioner in 1910. Rice was first sworn in as a Member of the Michigan House of Representatives from the Newaygo County district on January 1, 1913. In 1917, continued to serve in that capacity, while also becoming Speaker Pro Tempore Michigan House of Representatives until 1916. In his final term served on the Michigan House of Representatives, Rice was the Speaker of the Michigan House of Representatives.

== Death ==
Rice died on June 7, 1945.
