= Lynn C. Gardner =

American politician

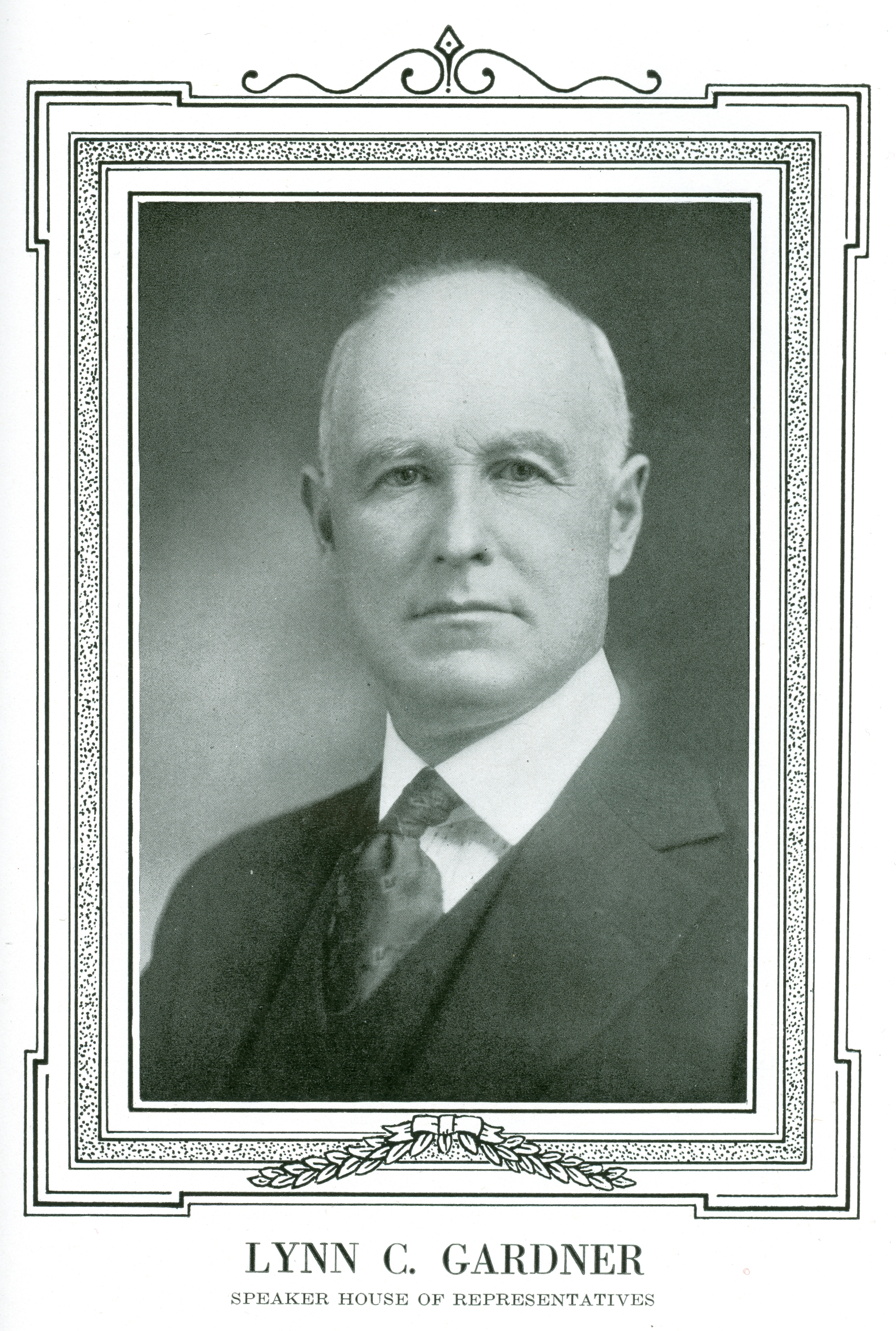

48th Speaker of the Michigan House of Representatives
- In office January 5, 1927 – June 6, 1927
- Preceded by: Fred B. Wells
- Succeeded by: Fred R. Ming

Member of the Michigan House of Representatives from the Livingston County district
- In office 1925–1930
- Preceded by: Clarence J. Fuller
- Succeeded by: Tracy F. Crandall

Personal details
- Born: Lynn Cleveland Gardner; May 30, 1877 Iosco Township, Michigan
- Died: November 24, 1948 (aged 71) Stockbridge, Michigan
- Resting place: Wright Cemetery, Livingston County, Michigan
- Party: Republican
- Spouse: Nina
- Profession: Farmer

Lynn C. Gardner (1877-1948) was a Republican politician from Michigan who served in the Michigan House of Representatives from 1925 through 1930. He served as Speaker of the House during the 54th Legislature.

Born to Robert and Frances Gardner in 1877, Gardner was educated in the local schools and became a farmer and teacher in Iosco Township. Gardner was a member of the Independent Order of Odd Fellows, the Grange, the Farm Bureau and the Farmers Union.

Prior to his election to the House in 1922, Gardner served on the local school board, as a township supervisor, and as justice of the peace. He was an unsuccessful candidate for the Michigan Senate in 1930. In 1939, he began a term of service on the Michigan Fair Board, and was an alternate delegate to the 1948 Republican National Convention.
