= List of speakers of the Michigan House of Representatives =

Speaker of the Michigan House of Representatives
- Great Seal of the State of Michigan

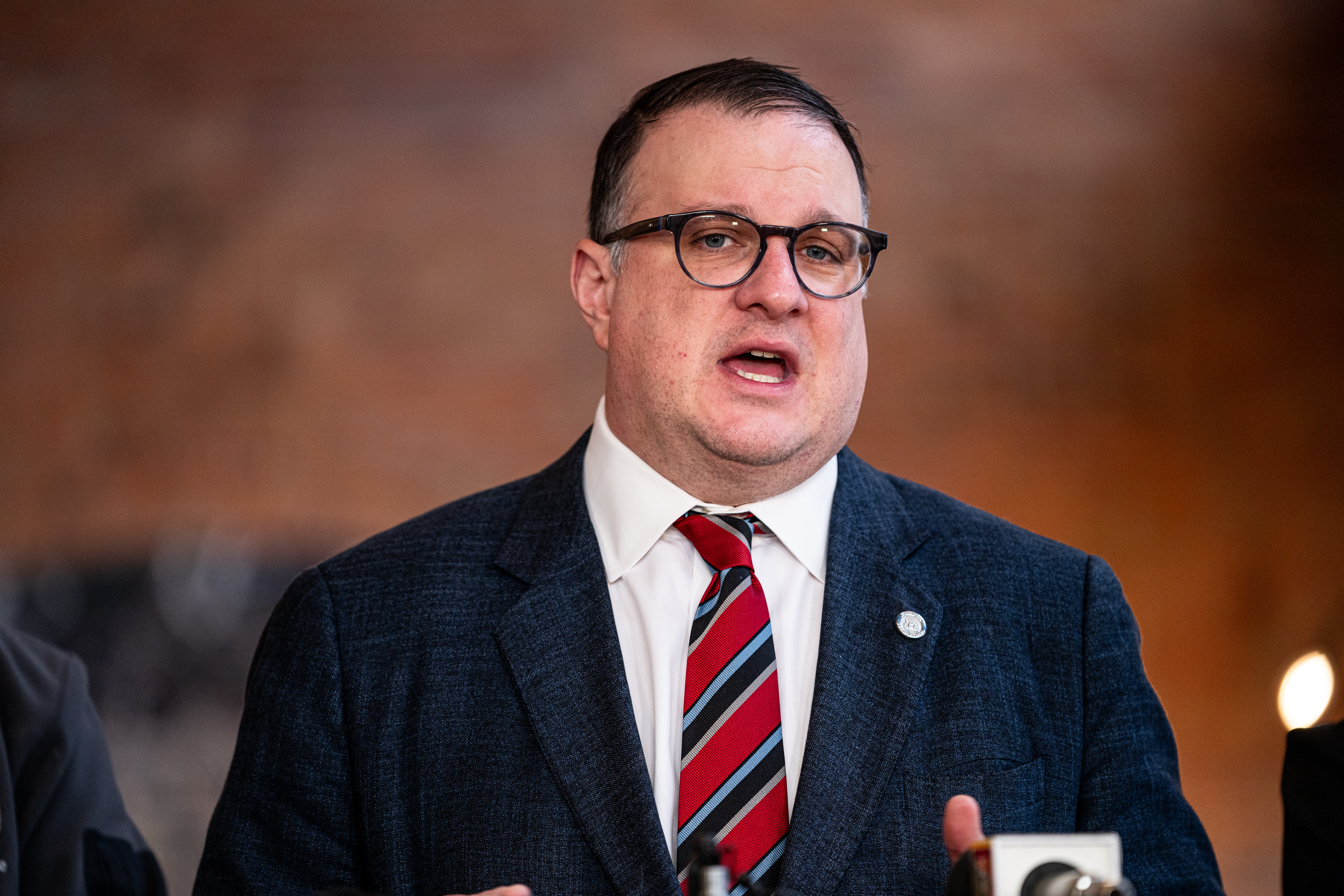
- Incumbent; Matt Hall since January 8, 2025
- Michigan House of Representatives
- Style: The Honorable
- Appointer: Elected by the Michigan House of Representatives
- Inaugural holder: Ezra Convis
- Succession: Fifth

This is a complete list of the speakers of the Michigan House of Representatives. Elected by the members of the House, the Speaker is the presiding officer of that body. In addition to duties as chair, the adopted rules of the House of Representatives specify other powers and duties of the post. The Speaker is currently elected for a two-year term in the odd-numbered years in which the Legislature convenes.

Several speakers have gone on to pursue and achieve higher office, including as a member of Congress or as Governor of Michigan.

Representative	Party	County of residence	District	Session years
Ezra Convis	Democratic	Calhoun	Calhoun	1835–1836
Charles W. Whipple	Democratic	Wayne	Wayne	1837
Kinsley S. Bingham	Democratic	Livingston	Livingston	1838–1839
Henry Acker	Whig	Jackson	Jackson	1840
Philo C. Fuller	Whig	Lenawee	Lenawee	1841
John Biddle	Whig	Wayne	Wayne	1841
Kinsley S. Bingham	Democratic	Livingston	Livingston	1842
Robert McClelland	Democratic	Monroe	Monroe	1843
Edwin H. Lothrop	Democratic	Kalamazoo	Kalamazoo	1844
Alfred H. Hanscom	Democratic	Oakland	Oakland	1845
Isaac E. Crary	Democratic	Calhoun	Calhoun	1846
George W. Peck	Democratic	Livingston	Livingston	1847
Alexander W. Buel	Democratic	Wayne	Wayne	1848
Leander Chapman	Democratic	Jackson	Jackson	1849
Silas G. Harris	Democratic	Ottawa	Ottawa/Kent	1850
Jefferson G. Thurber	Democratic	Monroe	Monroe	1851
Daniel G. Quackenboss	Democratic	Lenawee	1st Lenawee	1853
Cyrus Lovell	Republican	Ionia	Ionia	1855
Byron G. Stout	Democratic	Oakland	1st Oakland	1857–1858
Henry A. Shaw	Republican	Eaton	1st Eaton	1859
Dexter Mussey	Republican	Macomb	3rd Macomb	1861–1862
Sullivan M. Cutcheon	Republican	Washtenaw	1st Washtenaw	1863–1864
Gilbert E. Read	Republican	Kalamazoo	1st Kalamazoo	1865
P. Dean Warner	Republican	Oakland	3rd Oakland	1867
Jonathan J. Woodman	Republican	Van Buren	1st Van Buren	1869–1872
Charles M. Croswell	Republican	Lenawee	4th Lenawee	1873–1874
John P. Hoyt	Republican	Tuscola	Tuscola	1875
John T. Rich	Republican	Lapeer	1st Lapeer	1877–1879
Seth C. Moffatt	Republican	Grand Traverse	Gd. Traverse/Wexford	1881–1882
Sumner Howard	Republican	Genesee	1st Genesee	1883
Newcomb Clark	Republican	Bay	2nd Bay	1885
Daniel P. Markey	Republican	Ogemaw	Ogemaw	1887
Gerrit J. Diekema	Republican	Ottawa	1st Ottawa	1889
Philip B. Wachtel	Democratic	Cheboygan	Cheboygan	1891–1892
William A. Tateum	Republican	Kent	1st Kent	1893
William D. Gordon	Republican	Midland	Midland	1895–1898
Edgar J. Adams	Republican	Kent	1st Kent	1899–1900
John J. Carton	Republican	Genesee	2nd Genesee	1901–1903
Sheridan F. Master	Republican	Kalamazoo	1st Kalamazoo	1905
Nicholas J. Whelan	Republican	Ottawa	1st Ottawa	1907
Colin P. Campbell	Republican	Kent	3rd Kent	1909
Herbert F. Baker	Republican	Cheboygan	Cheboygan	1911–1912
Gilbert A. Currie	Republican	Midland	Midland	1913
Charles Wallace Smith	Republican	Lapeer	Lapeer	1915
Wayne R. Rice	Republican	Newaygo	Newaygo	1917
Thomas Read	Republican	Oceana	Oceana	1919
Fred L. Warner	Republican	Ionia	Ionia	1921–1922
George W. Welsh	Republican	Kent	1st Kent	1923
Fred B. Wells	Republican	Cass	Cass	1925–1926
Lynn C. Gardner	Republican	Livingston	Livingston	1927
Fred R. Ming	Republican	Cheboygan	Cheboygan	1929–1932
Martin R. Bradley	Democratic	Menominee	Menominee	1933–1934
George A. Schroeder	Democratic	Wayne	1st Wayne	1935–1938
Howard Nugent	Republican	Huron	Huron	1939–1946
Victor A. Knox	Republican	Chippewa	Chippewa	1947–1952
Wade Van Valkenburg	Republican	Kalamazoo	1st Kalamazoo	1953–1956
George Van Peursem	Republican	Ottawa	Ottawa	1957–1958
Don R. Pears	Republican	Berrien	1st Berrien	1959–1962
Allison Green	Republican	Tuscola	Tuscola	1963–1964
Joseph J. Kowalski	Democratic	Wayne	19	1965–1966
Robert E. Waldron	Republican	Wayne	1	1967–1968
William A. Ryan	Democratic	Wayne	3	1969–1974
Bobby Crim	Democratic	Genesee	82	1975–1982
Gary Owen	Democratic	Washtenaw	22	1983–1988
Lewis N. Dodak	Democratic	Saginaw	86	1989–1992
Curtis Hertel	Democratic	Wayne	2	1993–1994
Paul Hillegonds	Republican	Allegan	88	1993–1996
Curtis Hertel	Democratic	Wayne	2	1997–1998
Charles R. Perricone	Republican	Kalamazoo	61	1999–2000
Rick Johnson	Republican	Osceola	102	2001–2004
Craig DeRoche	Republican	Oakland	38	2005–2006
Andy Dillon	Democratic	Wayne	17	2007–2010
James "Jase" Bolger	Republican	Calhoun	63	2011–2014
Kevin Cotter	Republican	Isabella	99	2015–2016
Tom Leonard	Republican	Clinton	93	2017–2018
Lee Chatfield	Republican	Emmet	107	2019–2020
Jason Wentworth	Republican	Clare	97	2021–2022
Joe Tate	Democratic	Wayne	2	2023–2025
Matt Hall	Republican	Kalamazoo	42	2025–present

== See also ==
- List of majority leaders of the Michigan Senate
- List of Michigan state legislatures
