= Nicholas J. Whelan =

American politician

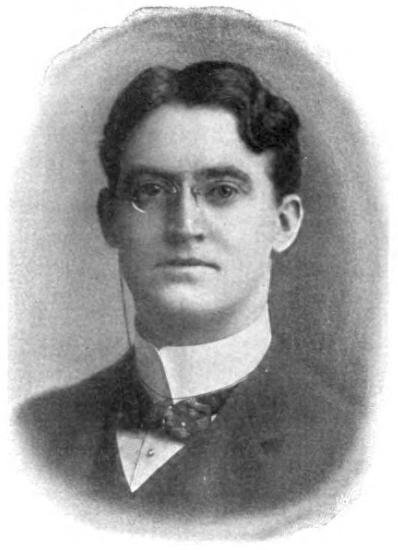

Speaker of the Michigan House of Representatives
- In office January 2, 1907 – 1908
- Preceded by: Sheridan F. Master
- Succeeded by: Colin P. Campbell

Member of the Michigan House of Representatives from the Ottawa County 1st district
- In office January 1, 1903 – 1908

Personal details
- Born: December 1869 Muskegon County, Michigan
- Died: April 9, 1952 (aged 82) Detroit, Michigan
- Party: Republican
- Spouse: Jeanne Blom

Nicholas Joseph Whelan (December 1869 – April 9, 1952) was the Speaker of the Michigan House of Representatives from 1907 to 1908.

== Early life ==
Whelan was born in December 1869 Muskegon County, Michigan.

== Career ==
Whelan was admitted to the bar in 1895. Whelan served as a member of the Michigan House of Representatives from the Ottawa County 1st district from January 8, 1903, to 1908. In his last term, he served as Speaker of the Michigan House of Representatives. Whelan was a Republican.

== Personal life ==
Whelan married Jeanne Blom in 1904.

== Death ==
Whelan died on April 9, 1952.
