= Lawrence Lindemer =

American politician (1921–2020)

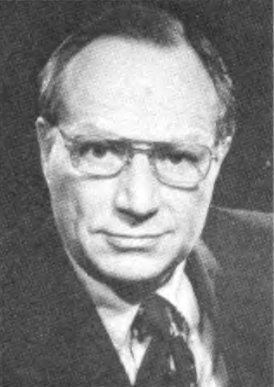

Member of the Michigan House of Representatives from the 2nd Ingham district
- In office 1951–1952
- Preceded by: Jacob Schepers
- Succeeded by: John J. McCune

Personal details
- Born: Lawrence Boyd Lindemer; August 21, 1921 Syracuse, New York, U.S.
- Died: May 21, 2020 (aged 98) Chelsea, Michigan, U.S.
- Party: Republican
- Spouse: Rebecca Mead Gale
- Children: two
- Education: Hamilton College; University of Michigan (AB, LLB)
- Occupation: attorney

Lawrence Boyd Lindemer (August 21, 1921 – May 21, 2020) was an American politician from Michigan.

Lindemer was born in Syracuse, New York in August 1921. He attended Hamilton College in New York for two years, then transferred to the University of Michigan and graduated with an A.B. degree in 1943. While at the University of Michigan, Lindemer took up residence in Stockbridge, Michigan, and married Rebecca Mead Gale in 1940, with whom he had two sons, Lawrence B., Jr., and David.

Lindemer served as a Second Lieutenant in the U.S. Army Air Force in World War II. After the war, he received a law degree from the University of Michigan Law School and began practice in 1948, but quickly took an interest in politics. He served as Assistant Prosecuting Attorney for Ingham County in 1949 and 1950.

In 1950, Lindemer ran for the Michigan State House of Representatives from Ingham County 2nd District. He defeated incumbent Jacob Schepers in the September Republican primary election, and went on to win the general election in November. In the August 1952 Republican primary, he lost to John J. McCune, who went on to win the general election. Lindemer then moved to Washington, D.C. to serve on the Hoover Commission from 1953 until 1955.

In 1955, Lindemer joined the law firm of Foster, Foster and Campbell. He was also chair of the Michigan Republican Party from 1957 to 1961 and was a delegate to the 1960 Republican National Convention and an alternate to the 1964 convention. In 1964, he served as Midwest Campaign Director for Nelson Rockefeller, a longtime friend, in his campaign for President. From 1962 to 1970, he also served as Commissioner of the State Bar of Michigan.

Lindemer was a candidate for Michigan Attorney General in 1966, losing to incumbent Democrat Frank J. Kelley. In 1968, he was appointed to the University of Michigan Board of Regents, then won election, and served from 1969 to 1975.

On June 2, 1975, Lindemer was appointed by Michigan Governor William G. Milliken to the Michigan Supreme Court to fill the vacancy caused by the death of Justice Thomas M. Kavanagh. In the November 1976 general election, Lindemer lost to Democrat Blair Moody Jr., and left office on January 1, 1977.

Lindemer subsequently worked as general counsel for Consumers Power Company and was later employed with the law firm of Foster, Swift, Collins and Smith, P.C.

He died on May 21, 2020, at Silver Maples of Chelsea retirement community, in Chelsea, Michigan, at the age of 98.

Michigan House of Representatives
Preceded by Jacob Schepers	Member of the Michigan House of Representatives from the 2nd Ingham district 1951–1952	Succeeded by John J. McCune
Party political offices
Preceded by John Feikens	Chairman of the Michigan Republican Party; 1957–1961	Succeeded by George Van Peursem
Preceded by Robert J. "Bob" Danhof	Republican nominee for Attorney General of Michigan; 1966	Succeeded by William S. Farr, Jr.
Legal offices
Preceded by Thomas M. Kavanagh	Associate Justice of the Michigan Supreme Court; 1975–1977	Succeeded by Blair Moody Jr.
