= J. Lee Morford =

American politician

Member of the Michigan Senate from the 29th district
- In office January 1, 1915 – 1918
- Preceded by: Frank Douglas Scott
- Succeeded by: Herbert F. Baker

Member of the Michigan House of Representatives from the Presque Isle County district
- In office January 1, 1911 – 1914

Personal details
- Born: June 14, 1873 Unionville, Michigan, US
- Died: 1940 (aged 66-90)
- Party: Republican

J. Lee Morford (June 14, 1873 – 1940) was a Michigan politician.

== Early life ==
Morford was born on June 14, 1873, in Unionville, Michigan. Morford was of Scottish ancestry. When Morford was fifteen, he took over management of the farm he spent most of his previous life on. When he was eighteen years old, Morford moved to Caro, Michigan, where he graduated high school. In 1900, he moved to Gaylord, Michigan.

== Career ==
In Gaylord, Morford served four terms as village president. At some point in his life, Morford worked as an undertaker and at some point as a banker. On November 8, 1910, Morford was elected as a Republican member of the Michigan House of Representatives from the Presque Isle County district. He served in this position from January 4, 1911, to 1914. On November 3, 1914, Morford was elected to the Michigan Senate where he represented the 29th district. He served in this position from January 6, 1915, to 1918.

== Death ==
Morford died in 1940. He was interred at Fairview Cemetery in Gaylord, Michigan.
