= Jonathan J. Woodman =

American politician (1825–1907)

Speaker of the Michigan House of Representatives
- In office January 6, 1869 – 1872
- Preceded by: P. Dean Warner
- Succeeded by: Charles Croswell

Member of the Michigan House of Representatives from the Van Buren County 1st district
- In office January 1, 1863 – 1872

Member of the Michigan House of Representatives from the Van Buren County district
- In office January 1, 1861 – 1862

Personal details
- Born: May 24, 1825 Sutton, Vermont
- Died: July 13, 1907 (aged 82) Paw Paw, Michigan
- Party: Republican
- Spouses: Harty H. Hunt (m. 1857; died 1894) Olivia J. Carpenter (m. 1896)

Jonathan J. Woodman (May 24, 1825 – July 13, 1907) was the Speaker of the Michigan House of Representatives from 1869 to 1872.

== Early life ==
Woodman was born on May 24, 1825, in Sutton, Vermont. His parents were Joseph Woodman and Tryphena Johnson who were the first settlers in Antwerp Township, east of Paw Paw, in Van Buren County, Michigan.

== Career ==
Woodman was sworn in as a member of the Michigan House of Representatives from the Van Buren County district on January 2, 1861, and served until 1862. Woodman was then sworn in on January 6, 1863, to represent the Van Buren County 1st district until 1872. From 1869 to 1872, Woodman concurrently served as the Speaker of the Michigan House of Representatives. Woodman was a delegate to the Republican National Convention from Michigan in 1876.

== Personal life ==
On March 30, 1857, Woodman married Harty H. Hunt. She died in November 1894. In 1896, Woodman married Olivia J. Carpenter. Woodman was a member of the Michigan State Grange and the National Grange.

== Death ==
Woodman died on July 13, 1907, in Paw Paw.
