= William D. Gordon (politician) =

American politician

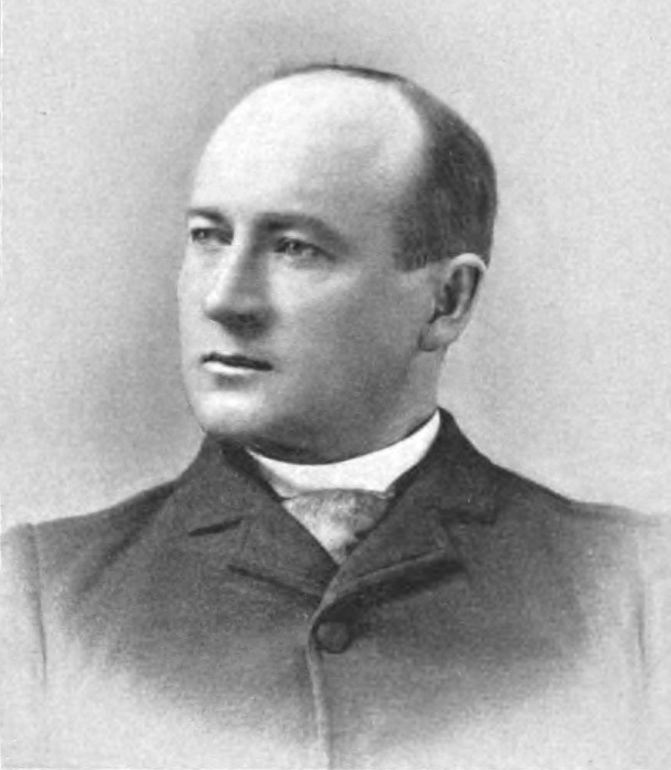

United States Attorney for the Eastern District of Michigan
- In office 1898–1906
- Appointed by: William McKinley
- Preceded by: Alfred P. Lyon
- Succeeded by: Frank H. Watson

34th Speaker of the Michigan House of Representatives
- In office 1895–1898
- Preceded by: William A. Tateum
- Succeeded by: Edgar J. Adams

Member of the Michigan House of Representatives from the Midland district
- In office 1893–1898
- Preceded by: Abram D. Salisbury
- Succeeded by: Duncan A. Wayne

Personal details
- Born: June 7, 1858 Bayfield, Canada West
- Died: June 20, 1917 (aged 59) Bay City, Michigan
- Education: University of Michigan Law School

William D. Gordon (1858–1917) was a politician and attorney from Michigan who served as United States Attorney for the Eastern District of Michigan from 1898 to 1906, and who had previously served in the Michigan House of Representatives, and as Speaker of the House during the 38th and 39th Legislatures.

Born in Canada in 1858, Gordon's family moved to Michigan when he was 17, and Gordon attended school in Bay City. Graduating from the University of Michigan Law School at age 21, Gordon established a practice in Midland and became active in the local Republican Party. Gordon would go on to serve as the circuit court commissioner, county prosecuting attorney, probate judge, and later city attorney. He was elected to the House of Representatives in 1893 and served three terms, his final two as Speaker. Gordon was appointed U.S. Attorney in 1898 by President William McKinley and he served in that office for eight years. Gordon died in Bay City in 1917, aged 59.
