= Samuel H. Thurber =

19th century American politician

Member of the Wisconsin Senate from the 19th district
- In office January 3, 1859 – January 7, 1861
- Preceded by: Temple Clark
- Succeeded by: Benjamin Sweet

Personal details
- Born: April 12, 1827 Ontario County, New York, U.S.
- Died: May 15, 1870 (aged 43) Pontiac, Michigan, U.S.
- Resting place: Oak Hill Cemetery, Pontiac
- Party: Democratic
- Spouse: Elsie Draper Chamberlain
- Children: Alice Lavene Thurber^{(b. 1851; died 1851)}; Jennie Lillian Thurber^{(b. 1853; died 1921)}; Frankie A. Thurber^{(b. 1854)}; Hallett S. Thurber^{(b. 1858; died 1948)}; Minnie E. Thurber^{(b. 1862; died 1871)}; Horace Chamberlain Thurber^{(b. 1863; died 1946)}; Frank Daniel Thurber^{(b. 1866; died 1942)}; Frances E. Thurber^{(b. 1866; died 1955)}
- Relatives: Jefferson G. Thurber (half-brother); Donald Neal Thurber (great-grandson)

Samuel Hallet Thurber (April 12, 1827 – May 15, 1870) was an American merchant, Democratic politician, and Wisconsin pioneer. He was a member of the Wisconsin Senate, representing Manitowoc and Calumet counties during the 1859 and 1860 sessions. His name was often abbreviated S. H. Thurber.

== Biography ==
Samuel H. Thurber was born in Ontario County, New York, in 1827. Sometime before 1848, he moved to Pontiac, Michigan, following several of his older half-siblings, and became involved in politics with the Democratic Party. He was involved in the hardware merchandise business with his half-brother, Horace C. Thurber. About 1856 he moved across Lake Michigan to Manitowoc, Wisconsin, establishing his own hardware business, dealing in stoves, farming equipment, tools, and other utensils. Shortly after arriving, another former Pontiac resident, S. E. Beach, came to Manitowoc and joined the business as a partner, the business was then known as Thurber & Beach.

In 1858, Thurber was the Democratic Party nominee for Wisconsin Senate in the 19th Senate district, which then comprised Manitowoc and Calumet counties. He defeated Republican A. W. Preston in the general election, and went on to serve in the 1859 and 1860 legislative sessions.

Sometime after his term in the legislature, he returned to Michigan. He died of tuberculosis in Pontiac, Michigan, on May 15, 1870.

== Personal life and family ==
Samuel Hallet Thurber was a son of Samuel Hallet Thurber of Unity, New Hampshire, by his second wife, Hannah (née Briggs) Thurber. Several of Thurber's older half-brothers were successful in Michigan business and politics. Jefferson G. Thurber served several terms in the state legislature and was speaker of the Michigan House of Representatives in 1851. Horace C. Thurber was a successful businessman, village president of Pontiac, Michigan, and was chosen as a presidential elector in 1848. Horace's son, Daniel D. Thurber served as mayor of Pontiac in the 1870s.

Samuel Hallet Thurber married Elsie Draper Chamberlain about 1849, in Michigan. They had at least eight children, though two died in childhood. Their grandson, Horace Chamberlain Thurber Jr. was a United States Army Air Corps training officer during World War II, but died in an automobile accident in 1943. Their great-grandson, Donald Neal Thurber also served in World War II as an enlisted man in the United States Navy, later in life he was responsible for creating and promulgating the D'Nealian method for teaching handwriting.

Wisconsin Senate
Preceded by Temple Clark	Member of the Wisconsin Senate from the 19th district January 3, 1859 – January 7, 1861	Succeeded by Benjamin Sweet
