= Daniel G. Quackenboss =

American politician

Speaker of the Michigan House of Representatives
- In office January 5, 1853 – 1853
- Preceded by: Jefferson G. Thurber
- Succeeded by: Cyrus Lovell

Member of the Michigan House of Representatives from the Lenawee County 1st district
- In office January 1, 1853 – 1853

Member of the Michigan House of Representatives from the Lenawee County district
- In office January 3, 1848 – 1851

Member of the New York State Assembly from the Greene County district
- In office 1841–1841

Personal details
- Born: 1812 New York
- Died: June 22, 1853 (aged 40–41)
- Party: Democratic
- Spouse: Elizabeth
- Children: 2

Daniel G. Quackenboss (1812 – June 22, 1853) was an American politician.

== Early life ==
Quackenboss was born in New York in 1812.

== Political career ==
Quackenboss served as a member of the New York State Assembly from the Greene County district in 1841. Around 1845, he moved to Tecumseh, Michigan. While living in Michigan, he served as a member of the Michigan House of Representatives from the Lenawee County district from 1848 to 1851. During his last term in the Michigan House of Representatives, in 1853, he represented the Lenawee County 1st district, and served as the Speaker of the Michigan House of Representatives.

== Personal life ==
Quackenboss married Elizabeth, and together they had two children.

== Death ==
Quackenboss died on June 22, 1853. He is interred at Brookside Cemetery, which is in Tecumseh, Michigan.
