= George A. Loud =

American politician

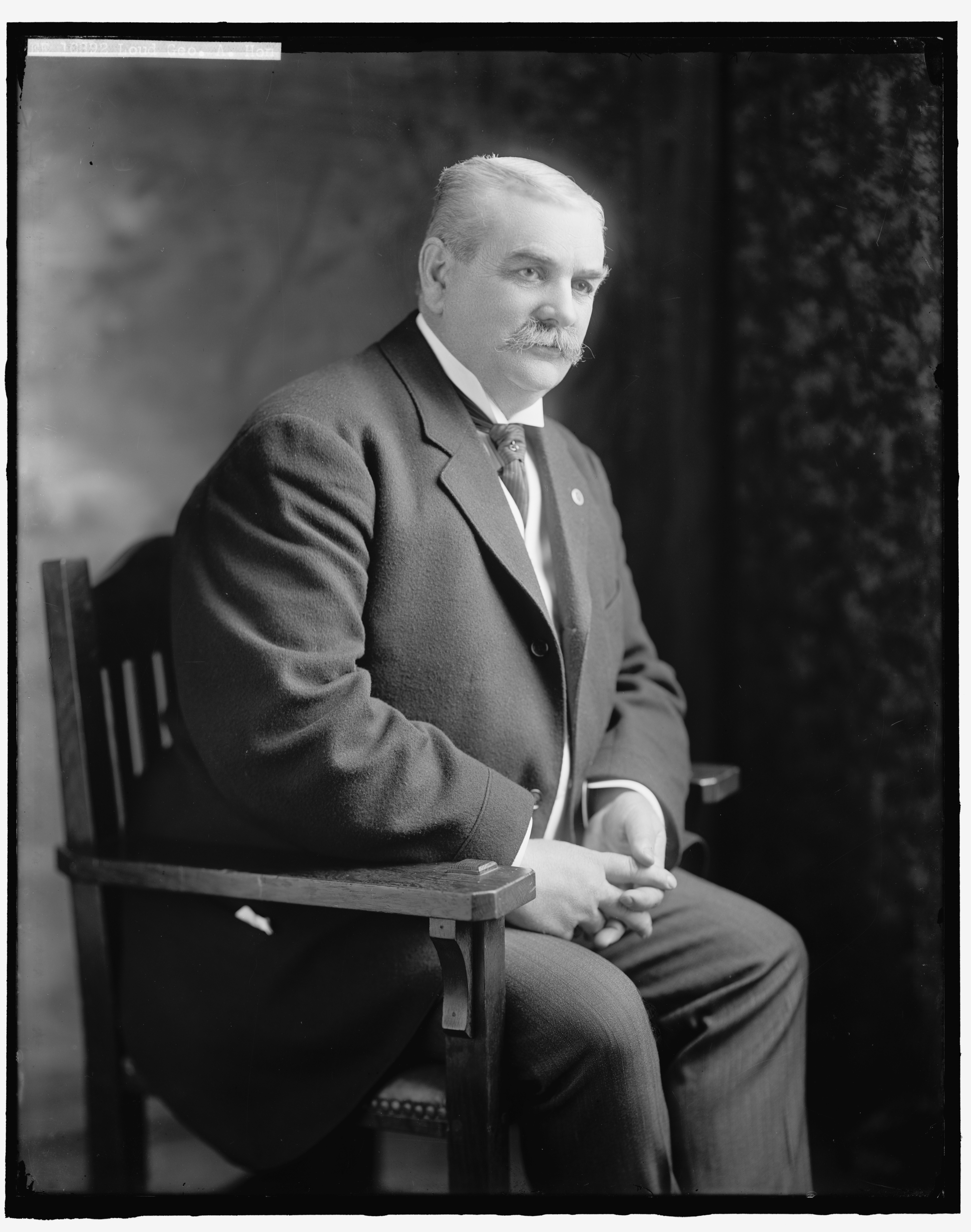
- Loud, c. 1925

Member of the U.S. House of Representatives from Michigan's 10th district
- In office March 4, 1915 – March 3, 1917
- Preceded by: Roy O. Woodruff
- Succeeded by: Gilbert A. Currie
- In office March 4, 1903 – March 3, 1913
- Preceded by: Henry H. Aplin
- Succeeded by: Roy O. Woodruff

Personal details
- Born: George Alvin Loud; June 18, 1852 Bainbridge Township, Geauga County, Ohio, U.S.
- Died: November 13, 1925 (aged 73) Myrtle Point, Oregon, U.S.
- Party: Republican

Colonel George Alvin Loud (June 18, 1852 – November 13, 1925) was a politician and businessman from the U.S. state of Michigan. He served six terms in the U.S. House of Representatives in the early 19th century.

== Biography ==
Loud was born in Bainbridge Township, Geauga County, Ohio, and moved with his parents (Henry M. Loud and Vilitta Kile) to Massachusetts in 1856 and then to Au Sable, Michigan, in 1866. He attended the English High School in Boston, and Professor Patterson's School at Detroit, He graduated from Ann Arbor High School (now Pioneer High School) in 1869. He was vice president and general manager of the Au Sable and Northwestern Railroad. For four years he was a colonel on the staff of Michigan Governor Hazen S. Pingree. He was paymaster on the U.S. revenue cutter McCulloch when it participated in the Battle of Manila Bay during the Spanish–American War.

=== Congress ===
Loud was elected as a Republican from Michigan's 10th congressional district to the 58th United States Congress and to the four succeeding Congresses, serving from March 4, 1903, to March 3, 1913. In 1912, Loud was defeated by Progressive Roy O. Woodruff. Loud defeated Woodruff in 1914 to be elected to the 64th Congress, serving from March 4, 1915, to March 3, 1917. In 1916, Loud was defeated in the Republican Party primary elections by Gilbert A. Currie.

=== Later career and death ===
Loud returned to engage in the lumber business at Au Sable. In 1925, he was killed at the age of 73 in an automobile accident at Myrtle Point, Oregon, and was interred in Au Sable Cemetery in Oscoda.

== Sources ==
- United States Congress. "George A. Loud (id: L000449)". Biographical Directory of the United States Congress.
- The Political Graveyard

U.S. House of Representatives
Preceded by Henry H. Alpin	United States Representative for the 10th congressional district of Michigan; 1903–1913	Succeeded by Roy O. Woodruff
Preceded by Roy O. Woodruff	United States Representative for the 10th congressional district of Michigan; 1915–1917	Succeeded by Gilbert A. Currie
