= Gilbert A. Currie =

American politician

Gilbert Archibald Currie
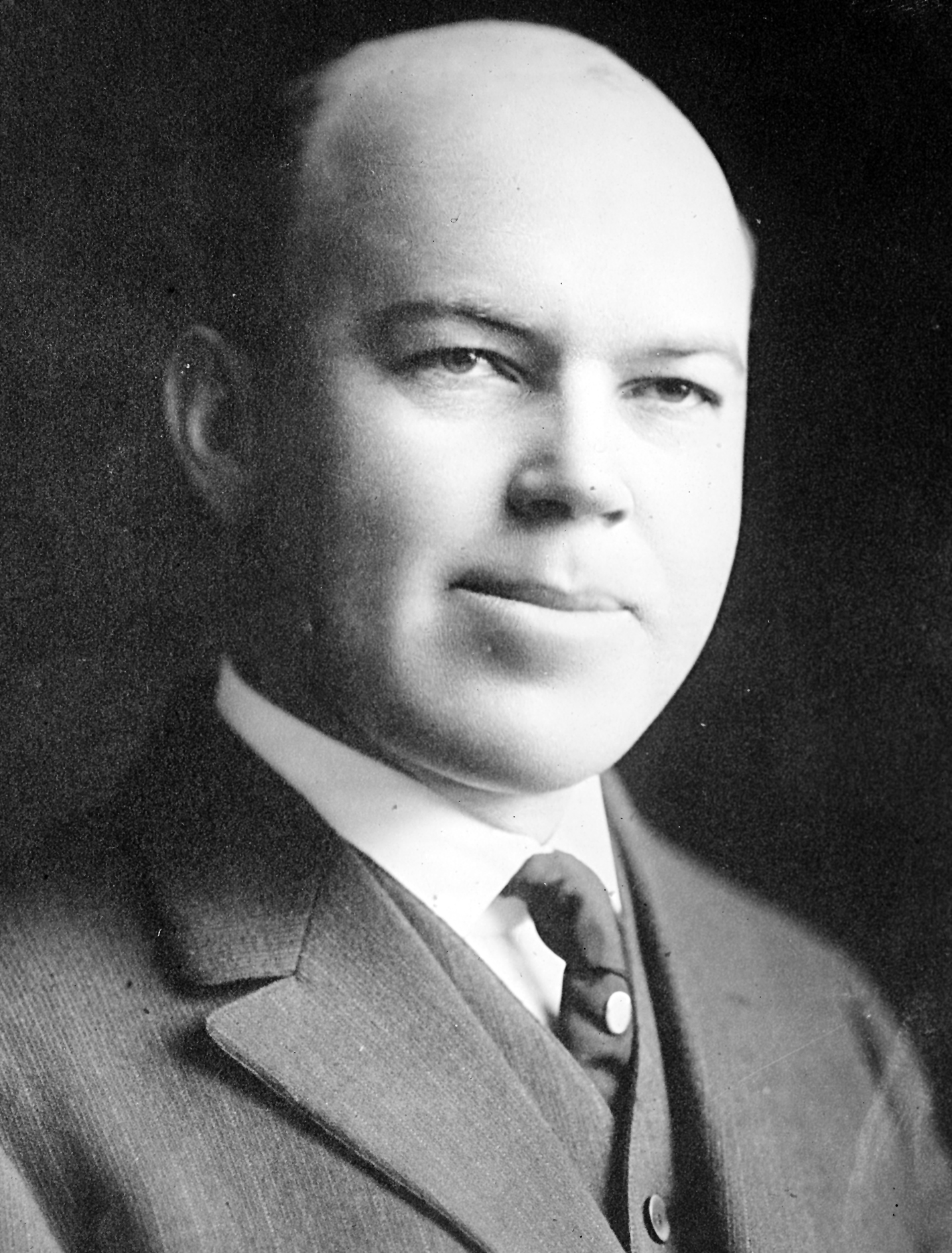
- Currie circa 1917

41st Speaker of the Michigan House of Representatives
- In office January 1, 1913 – December 31, 1914
- Governor: Woodbridge N. Ferris
- Preceded by: Herbert F. Baker
- Succeeded by: Charles Wallace Smith

Member of the U.S. House of Representatives from Michigan's 10th district
- In office March 4, 1917 – March 3, 1921
- Preceded by: George A. Loud
- Succeeded by: Roy O. Woodruff

Member of the Michigan House of Representatives from the Midland County district
- In office 1909–1915

Personal details
- Born: Gilbert Archibald Currie; September 19, 1882 Midland Township, Michigan
- Died: June 5, 1960 (aged 77) Midland, Michigan
- Resting place: Midland Cemetery, Midland, Michigan
- Party: Republican
- Education: University of Michigan Law School

Gilbert Archibald Currie (September 19, 1882 – June 5, 1960) was a lawyer and politician from the U.S. state of Michigan. He served in the Michigan House of Representatives including as speaker and served in the United States House of Representatives.

== Biography ==
Currie was born in Midland Township, Michigan, attended the district school, Midland High School, and graduated from the law department of the University of Michigan at Ann Arbor in 1905.

He was admitted to the Michigan bar in 1905 and commenced practice in Midland. He was a member of the Michigan House of Representatives from 1909 to 1915, serving as speaker of the House during the 47th Legislature.

=== Congress ===
Currie was an unsuccessful candidate for the Republican nomination in 1914 to the 64th Congress. In 1916, he was elected from Michigan's 10th congressional district to the 65th Congress and was reelected in 1918 to the 66th, serving from March 4, 1917, to March 3, 1921. He was unsuccessful candidate for renomination in 1920.

=== Later career and death ===
After leaving Congress, Currie resumed the practice of law and also engaged in the banking business until 1960, when he died in Midland at the age of 77. He was interred in Midland Cemetery.

U.S. House of Representatives
Preceded by George A. Loud	United States Representative for the 10th congressional district of Michigan; 1917–1921	Succeeded by Roy O. Woodruff
