= Leander Chapman =

American politician

Speaker of the Michigan House of Representatives
- In office January 1, 1849 – 1850
- Preceded by: Alexander W. Buel
- Succeeded by: Silas G. Harris

Member of the Michigan House of Representatives from the Jackson County district
- In office January 1, 1849 – 1849

Personal details
- Born: Oswego County, New York
- Died: September 3, 1872 Cedar Falls, Iowa
- Party: Democratic
- Spouse: Caroline
- Children: 2

Leander Chapman was the Speaker of the Michigan House of Representatives in 1849.

== Early life ==
The date of Chapman's birth is unknown, but is estimated to be around 1804 or 1810 in Oswego County, New York. Chapman moved to Jackson County, Michigan in 1835, the second lawyer to do so.

== Career ==
Chapman served as a probate judge from 1836 to 1840, and as a prosecuting attorney in 1838. Chapman unsuccessfully ran for the Michigan House of Representatives in 1840. Chapman was Jackson County Treasurer from 1842 to 1846. In 1845, Chapman served as president of the Jackson County Bar. In either 1846 or 1847, Chapman was appointed Commissioner of the Land Office in Detroit. Chapman was sworn in as a member of the Michigan House of Representatives from the Jackson County district from 1849 to 1850, serving as Speaker of the Michigan House of Representatives during his single term. Chapman was appointed Surveyor General of Ohio, Indiana, and Michigan by President Franklin Pierce.

Chapman later moved to Cedar Falls, Iowa. He continued to practice law in Iowa. Chapman served as the Democratic nominee for the United States House of Representatives seat representing Iowa's 6th district in 1864.

== Personal life ==
Chapman was married to Caroline, and together they had two children. Chapman was a Freemason and Episcopalian.

== Death ==
According to Chapman's obituary published by The Courier, a newspaper in Waterloo, Iowa, Chapman died in Cedar Falls on September 3, 1872. According to a book entitled History of Jackson County, Michigan published in 1881, Chapman died in either 1863 or 1864.
