= Colin P. Campbell =

American politician (1877–1956)

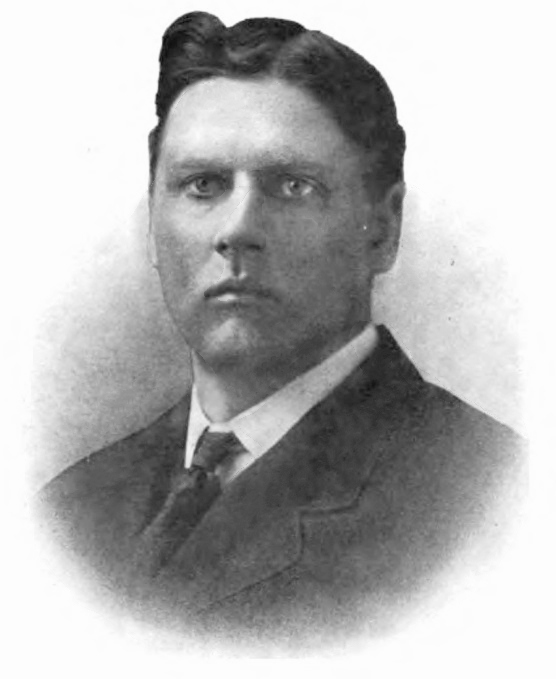

Speaker of the Michigan House of Representatives
- In office January 6, 1909 – 1910
- Preceded by: Nicholas J. Whelan
- Succeeded by: Herbert F. Baker

Member of the Michigan House of Representatives from the Kent County 3rd district
- In office January 1, 1907 – 1910

Personal details
- Born: July 3, 1877 Walker Townnship, Michigan, US
- Died: May 18, 1956 (aged 78)
- Party: Republican
- Spouses: Irene Jane Bowers (m. 1897; died 1916); Millie Barnes (m. 1919)
- Education: Albion College; University of Michigan

Colin Percy Campbell (July 3, 1877 – May 18, 1956) was the Speaker of the Michigan House of Representatives from 1909 to 1910.

== Early life ==
Campbell was born on July 3, 1877, in Walker Townnship, Michigan. Campbell was of Scottish ancestry. He attended Albion College and graduated from the University of Michigan.

== Career ==
Campbell was a lawyer. He served as a Republican member of the Michigan House of Representatives from the Kent County 3rd district for a single term in 1909 and 1910. Campbell was defeated for re-election in 1910. During his term in the office, he served as the Speaker of the Michigan House of Representatives.

== Personal life ==
Campbell married Irene Jane Bowers on July 14, 1897. He was widowed upon her death on June 8, 1916. Campbell remarried on July 2, 1919, to Millie Barnes.

Campbell died on May 18, 1956.
