= George Van Peursem =

American politician from Michigan

George M. Van Peursem
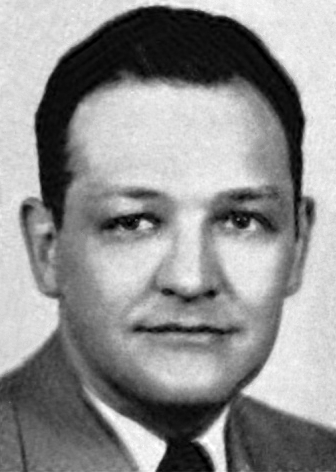

55th Speaker of the Michigan House of Representatives
- In office 1957–1958
- Governor: G. Mennen Williams
- Preceded by: Wade Van Valkenburg
- Succeeded by: Don R. Pears

Member of the Michigan House of Representatives from the Ottawa County district
- In office 1951–1959

34th Chairman of the Michigan Republican Party
- In office 1961–1963
- Preceded by: Lawrence Lindemer
- Succeeded by: Arthur G. Elliott, Jr.

Personal details
- Born: December 18, 1912 Holland, Michigan
- Died: June 20, 1998 (aged 85) Grand Ledge, Michigan
- Party: Republican
- Spouse: Gladys

George Van Peursem (December 18, 1912 – June 20, 1998) was an American politician from the State of Michigan.

Van Peursem was born in December 18, 1912 and was a resident of Zeeland, Michigan. He was a member of Michigan State House of Representatives from Ottawa County from 1951 until he resigned in 1959. He was Speaker of the Michigan State House of Representatives from 1957 to 1958. He served as Chairman of the Michigan Republican Party from 1961 to 1963. He served as Lansing representative of the Michigan Manufacturers Association from 1963 until becoming president in 1972, serving until 1979.

George Van Peursem died in Grand Ledge, Michigan, on June 20, 1998, at the age of 85.

Party political offices
Preceded by Lawrence Lindemer	Chairman of the Michigan Republican Party; 1961– 1963	Succeeded by Arthur G. Elliott, Jr.
