= Fred B. Wells =

American politician

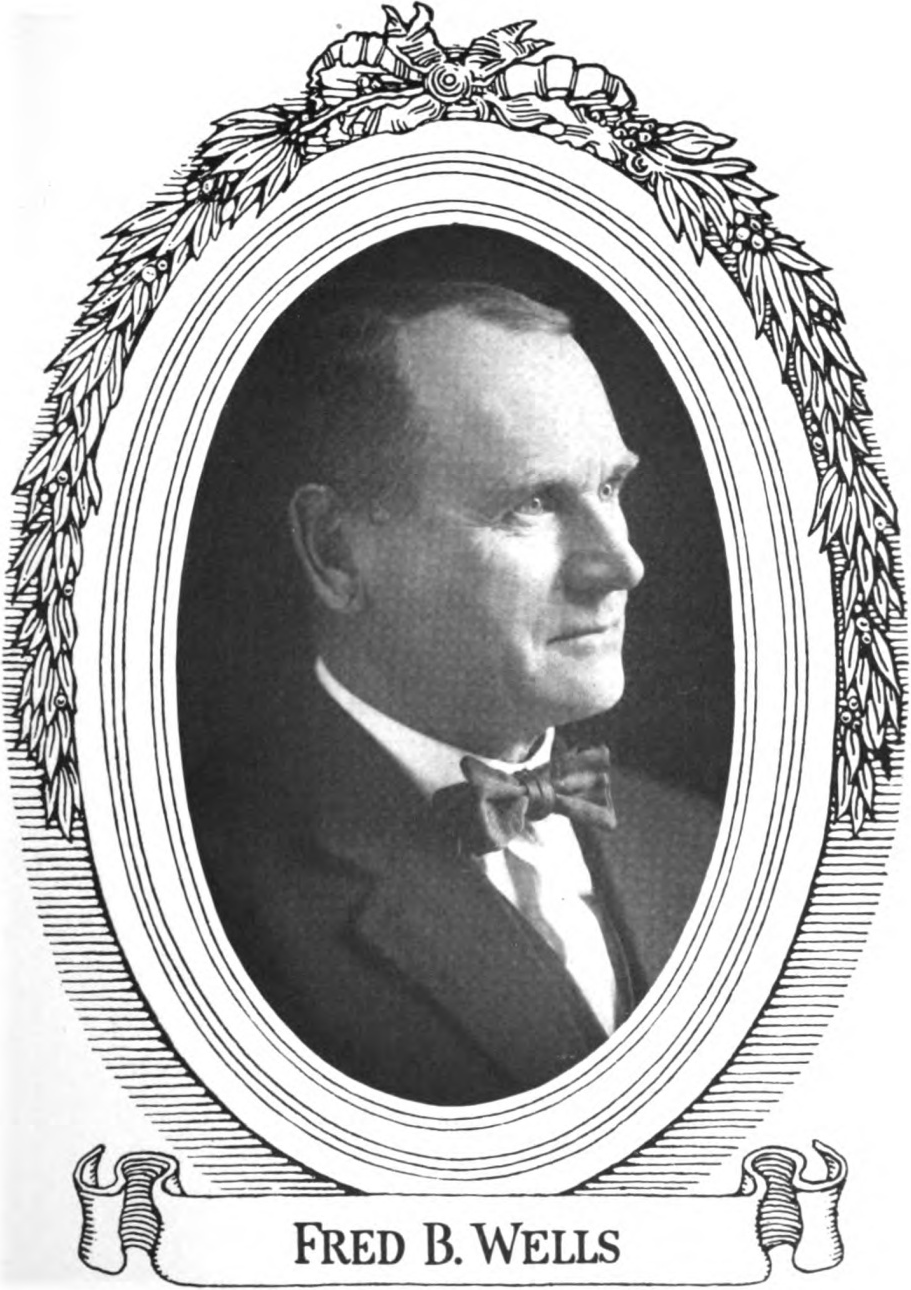

47th Speaker of the Michigan House of Representatives
- In office 1925–1926
- Preceded by: George W. Welsh
- Succeeded by: Lynn C. Gardner

Member of the Michigan House of Representatives from the Cass County district
- In office 1915–1926
- Succeeded by: Otis Huff

Personal details
- Born: February 16, 1861 Wayne Township, Michigan
- Died: November 25, 1932 (aged 71) LaGrange Township, Michigan
- Party: Republican
- Spouse: Ina
- Profession: Farmer

Fred B. Wells (1861–1932) was a Republican politician from Michigan who served in the Michigan House of Representatives from 1915 through 1926. He served as the Speaker of the House during the 53rd Legislature.

Wells was born in Wayne Township in 1861 and moved to LaGrange Township at age 5. His parents trace Puritan ancestry to Rhode Island. After attending the local public schools, Wells learned to farm using scientific methods. He was a member of the Masons, the Grange, and the local Farm Bureau.

First elected in 1914, Wells served six terms in the Michigan House of Representatives for Cass County. He worked to reform the state tax system. An unsuccessful candidate for lieutenant governor in 1926, Wells retired to his farm and died on November 25, 1932.
