= Henry M. Loud =

American Businessman and Preacher

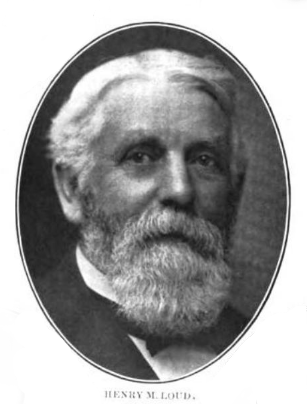
Henry M. Loud, c. 1904

Signature

Henry Martin Loud (December 11, 1824—May 13, 1905) was a Michigan lumber magnate, politician, lay Methodist preacher, and philanthropist. Loud was born in Westhampton, Massachusetts and graduated from the Boston University School of Theology (then the Concord Biblical Institute) in 1857.

Following his work in the ministry, Loud became the founder and long-time president of H. M. Loud & Sons Lumber Co. of Oscoda, Michigan. A Republican, Loud also served as Mayor of Au Sable, Michigan for one term and accepted a nomination for the United States Congress. Loud was a contributor to the Bayview Association of the United Methodist Church "a pioneering institution in public education" which bears a building—Loud Hall —in his name. Loud was president of White Iron Lake, Iron And Water Power Company and owned 500 acres of land in Paloma, California for citrus farming.

H. M. Loud & Sons was established in 1885 with stock of the Au Sable & North Western Railroad incorporated in 1891. The Board of the Loud lumber company (following Henry M. Loud as president) was as follows:

- George A. Loud—Vice President
- Henry Nelson Loud—Secretary
- Edward F. Loud—Treasurer
- William Fairchild Loud—Clerk

Henry Martin Loud served as a trustee for Albion College and endowed a $30,000 scholarship. in 1897, Loud started the Loud Lectureship for the Wesley Foundation at the University of Michigan. Loud has appeared in "Who's Who in America" Volume III (1903-1905), as well as publications on Lumbermen, and Michigan Entrepreneurs. A decedent of Clan MacLeoid of Scotland by his father Austin Loud, his lineage also traces to Jonathan Brewster (eldest son of Elder William Brewster and Mary Brewster of the Mayflower Voyage).
