= P. Dean Warner =

American politician

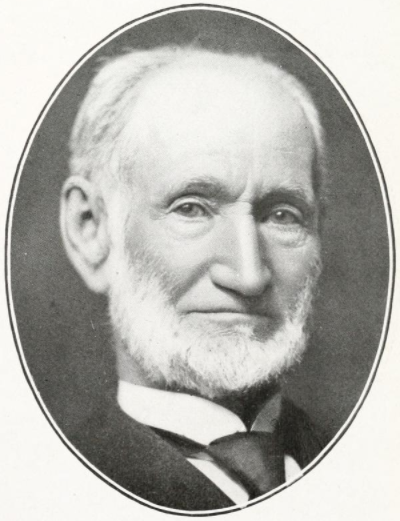

Member of the Michigan Senate from the 5th district
- In office January 1, 1869 – 1870

Speaker of the Michigan House of Representatives
- In office January 2, 1867 – 1868
- Preceded by: Gilbert E. Read
- Succeeded by: Jonathan J. Woodman

Member of the Michigan House of Representatives from the Oakland County 3rd district
- In office January 1, 1867 – 1868

Member of the Michigan House of Representatives from the Oakland County 5th district
- In office January 1, 1865 – 1866

Member of the Michigan House of Representatives from the Oakland County district
- In office February 5, 1851 – 1852

Personal details
- Born: August 12, 1822 Hector, New York, US
- Died: August 28, 1910 (aged 88) Farmington, Michigan, US
- Party: Republican
- Spouse: Rhoda Elizabeth

Pascal D'Angelis “Dean” Warner (August 12, 1822 – August 28, 1910) was a Michigan politician.

== Early life ==
Warner was born in Hector, New York, on August 12, 1822.

== Personal life ==
Warner was married to Rhoda Elizabeth Botsford. Together, they were the parent of at least one child, and were the adoptive parents of Fred M. Warner.

== Political career ==
Warner served as a member of the Michigan House of Representatives the Oakland County district, before the districts of Michigan were divided, from 1851 to 1852. Then, Warner served as member of the Michigan House of Representatives from the Oakland County 5th district 1865 to 1866. Warner, in 1867, was delegate to Michigan state constitutional convention. Warner then served as the Speaker of the Michigan House of Representatives when he served as a member of the Michigan House of Representatives from the Oakland County 3rd district 1867 to 1868. Warner first served on the Michigan Senate from 1869 to 1870, when he retired from politics.

== Death ==
Warner died on August 28, 1910, in Farmington, Michigan.
