= John J. Carton =

American politician (1856–1934)

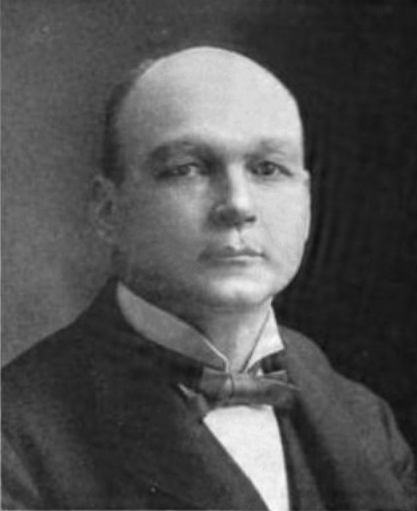

Speaker of the Michigan House of Representatives
- In office January 2, 1901 – 1904
- Preceded by: Edgar J. Adams
- Succeeded by: Sheridan F. Master

Member of the Michigan House of Representatives from the Genesee County 2nd district
- In office January 1, 1899 – 1904

Personal details
- Born: November 8, 1856 Clayton Township, Genesee County, Michigan
- Died: August 26, 1934 (aged 77) Flint, Michigan
- Party: Republican
- Spouse: Addie C. Pierson

John Jay Carton (November 8, 1856 – August 26, 1934) was the Speaker of the Michigan House of Representatives from 1901 to 1904.

== Early life ==
Carton was born on November 8, 1856, in Clayton Township, Genesee County, Michigan, to parents John and Ann Carton. Carton had 13 siblings. Carton was of Irish ancestry.

== Career ==
Carton was admitted to the bar on August 21, 1844. He became legal partners with George H. Durand. Carton was sworn in to the Michigan House of Representatives on January 4, 1899. He would serve until 1904, becoming Speaker of the Michigan House of Representatives in 1901. From 1907 to 1908, Carton was a delegate to Michigan state constitutional convention from the 13th district.

== Personal life ==
Carton married Addie C. Pierson on November 22, 1898, in Ukiah, California. Carton was a Freemason.

== Death ==
Carton died on August 26, 1934, in Flint, Genesee County, Michigan.
