= Gilbert E. Read =

American politician

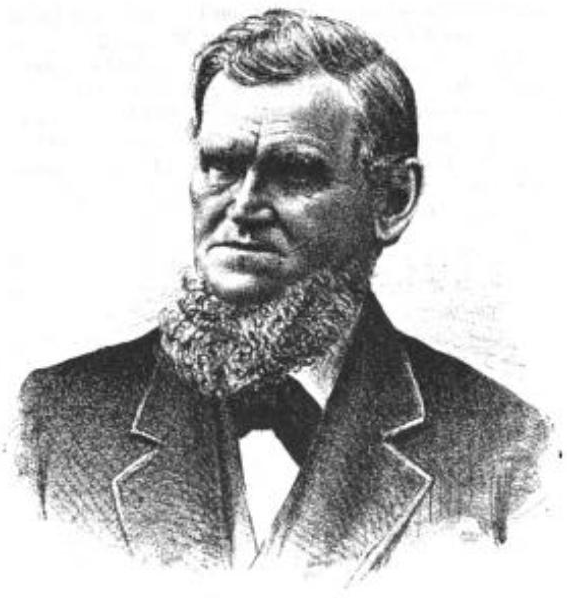

Member of the Michigan Senate from the 11th district
- In office January 1, 1877 – 1881
- Preceded by: Matthew T. Garvey
- Succeeded by: Ebenezer Lakin Brown

Speaker of the Michigan House of Representatives
- In office January 7, 1863 – 1866
- Preceded by: Sullivan M. Cutcheon
- Succeeded by: P. Dean Warner

Member of the Michigan House of Representatives from the Kalamazoo County 1st district
- In office January 1, 1863 – 1866

Member of the Michigan House of Representatives from the Kalamazoo County 2nd district
- In office January 1, 1861 – 1862

Personal details
- Born: May 6, 1822 Ludlow, Vermont
- Died: May 16, 1898 (aged 76) Richland, Michigan
- Party: Republican
- Spouse: Mary Ann Daniels

Gilbert Ezra Read (May 6, 1822 – May 16, 1898) was a Michigan politician.

== Early life ==
Read was born to parents Rufus and Rhoda Read in Ludlow, Windsor County, Vermont, on May 6, 1822.

== Personal life ==
Read was married to Mary Ann Daniels. Read was the uncle of Edward G. Read.

== Political career ==
Read was served as a member of the Michigan House of Representatives from the Kalamazoo County 2nd district from 1861 to 1862. Then he served as a member of the Michigan House of Representatives from the Kalamazoo County 1st district from 1863 to 1866. During this term he also served as the Speaker of the Michigan House of Representatives. Read served on the Michigan Senate from 1877 to 1881.

== Death ==
Read died on May 16, 1898, in Richland, Kalamazoo County, Michigan. He was interred at Prairie Home Cemetery.
