= Arthur G. Elliott Jr. =

American politician

Arthur G. Elliott Jr. (October 17, 1916 – August 18, 2003) was an American politician from the state of Michigan.

Elliott had resided in Royal Oak, Pleasant Ridge and Birmingham; all located in Oakland County. He was a delegate to the Republican National Convention from Michigan in 1960 and 1964. He was a delegate to the Michigan State Constitutional Convention from Oakland County 5th District, 1961–1962. He served as Chairman of the Michigan Republican Party 1963–1965.

== See also ==
Party political offices
Preceded by George Van Peursem	Chairman of the Michigan Republican Party; 1963– 1965	Succeeded by Elly M. Peterson
