= Foster Swift Collins & Smith =

Foster, Swift, Collins & Smith, P.C.
- Headquarters: Lansing, Michigan; United States
- No. of offices: 6
- No. of attorneys: 95
- Key people: Anne M. Seurynck, President
- Date founded: 1902
- Founder: Walter S. Foster
- Website: www.fosterswift.com

Foster, Swift, Collins & Smith, P.C. is a law firm in the American state of Michigan, founded in 1902.

== Overview ==
Foster Swift has offices in Lansing, Southfield, Grand Rapids, Michigan, and Holland. As of January 2025, the firm had 97 attorneys in Michigan and ranked twelfth on Crain's list of the largest law firms in the state; it was the only firm in the top 25 headquartered outside metropolitan Detroit or Grand Rapids.

== History ==
By the mid-1950s the Lansing practice was known as Foster, Foster & Campbell. Theodore W. Swift joined in 1955 after meeting partner Richard B. Foster at a cocktail party, where Foster was looking for new lawyers for the firm. Lawrence Lindemer joined the same year, and for a period the firm practised as Foster, Lindemer, Swift and Collins.

Swift became the firm's leading originator of business, and the clients he and his colleagues took on in this period included the Michigan Education Association in its early years, the state's largest health insurer, and its largest gas and electric utilities. Among Lindemer's largest clients was the Michigan Milk Producers Association. Lindemer was appointed to the Michigan Supreme Court in 1975 and afterwards spent ten years as general counsel of Consumers Power before rejoining the firm in 1986; he was still of counsel in Lansing at the age of 91. Swift died on February 25, 2000, and the Ingham County Bar Association subsequently named its civility award in his memory.

In January 2016 the firm announced that it would acquire DeFrancesco, Dienes & Smith of St. Joseph, effective February 1, with the acquired practice operating as a satellite office serving southwest Michigan. At the time Foster Swift had 95 attorneys and offices in Lansing, Detroit, Grand Rapids, Holland and Farmington Hills.

== Practice groups ==
- Health Care
- Employer Services
- Trusts and Estates
- Administrative & Municipal
- Business & Corporate Law
- General & Commercial Litigation
- Finance, Real Estate & Bankruptcy Services

== Recognition ==
- Martindale-Hubbell Peer Review Rating
  - Forty-two attorneys hold AV Preeminent rating
- Best Law Firms in America
  - Ranked a tier 1 law firm in 26 different practice areas

== See also ==
- Warner Norcross & Judd
