= Edgar J. Adams =

American politician (1866–1944)

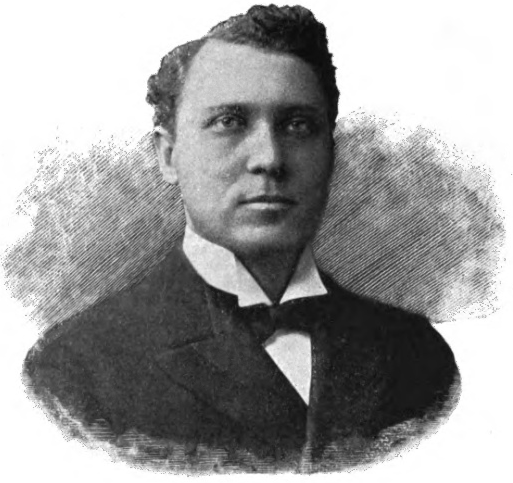

35th Speaker of the Michigan House of Representatives
- In office January 4, 1899 – December 22, 1900
- Preceded by: William D. Gordon
- Succeeded by: John J. Carton

Member of the Michigan House of Representatives from the Kent County 1st district
- In office 1897–1900
- Preceded by: Charles Holden
- Succeeded by: David E. Burns

Personal details
- Born: August 6, 1866 Branch County, Michigan
- Died: May 23, 1944 (aged 77) Washington, D.C.
- Party: Republican
- Spouse: Alta
- Profession: Lawyer

Edgar Jacob Adams (August 6, 1866 – May 23, 1944) was a Republican member of the Michigan House of Representatives from 1897 through 1900. He served as Speaker of the House during the 40th Legislature.

Adams was born in August 1866 to George and Margaret Adams. At age 6, the family moved to a farm in Monroe County, where he attended school, and again, six years later, the family moved to a farm in Gratiot County. Adams' father was a distant relative of John and John Quincy Adams. He taught one term of school at age 17, later becoming employed by Hopkins & Lyon in Mt. Pleasant. Adams taught himself in the law and, after moving to Grand Rapids in 1892, was admitted to the bar in 1894.

Adams' re-election in 1898 was not without controversy as he was opposed by Governor Hazen S. Pingree and members of his own political party. His election as Speaker in 1899 was similarly fraught, and described as "one of the most bitter and determined fights ever witnessed."

Adams served as a delegate to the convention which drafted the 1908 Michigan Constitution. He was a member of the Knights of Pythias.
