= Don R. Pears =

American politician (1899–1992)

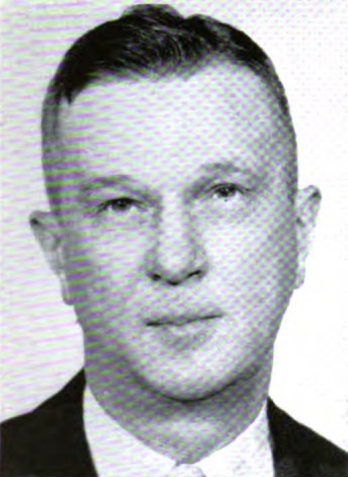

56th Speaker of the Michigan House of Representatives
- In office January 14, 1959 – December 31, 1962
- Preceded by: George Van Peursem
- Succeeded by: Allison Green

Member of the Michigan House of Representatives from the 43rd district
- In office January 1, 1965 – December 31, 1970

Member of the Michigan House of Representatives from the 1st Berrien district
- In office January 1, 1951 – December 31, 1962

Berrien County Clerk
- In office 1945–1948
- In office 1941–1942

Berrien County Register of Deeds
- In office 1927–1932

Personal details
- Born: Don Roe Pears; September 18, 1899 Buchanan, Michigan
- Died: July 17, 1992 (aged 92) Niles, Michigan
- Resting place: Oak Ridge Cemetery, Buchanan, Michigan
- Party: Republican
- Spouse: Gladys

Military service
- Allegiance: United States of America
- Branch/service: United States Army
- Years of service: World War I World War II

Don R. Pears (September 18, 1899 – July 17, 1992) was a Republican politician from Michigan who served in the Michigan House of Representatives, and as its Speaker during the 70th and 71st Legislatures. He also served as register of deeds and later as clerk of Berrien County.

A lifelong resident of southwest Michigan, Pears was a school principal and a real estate broker. He was also a veteran of the U.S. Army and a member of the American Legion, the Veterans of Foreign Wars, AMVETS, and the Reserve Officers Association, as well as of the Elks, Eagles, Moose, and Odd Fellows.
