= Daniel P. Markey =

American politician

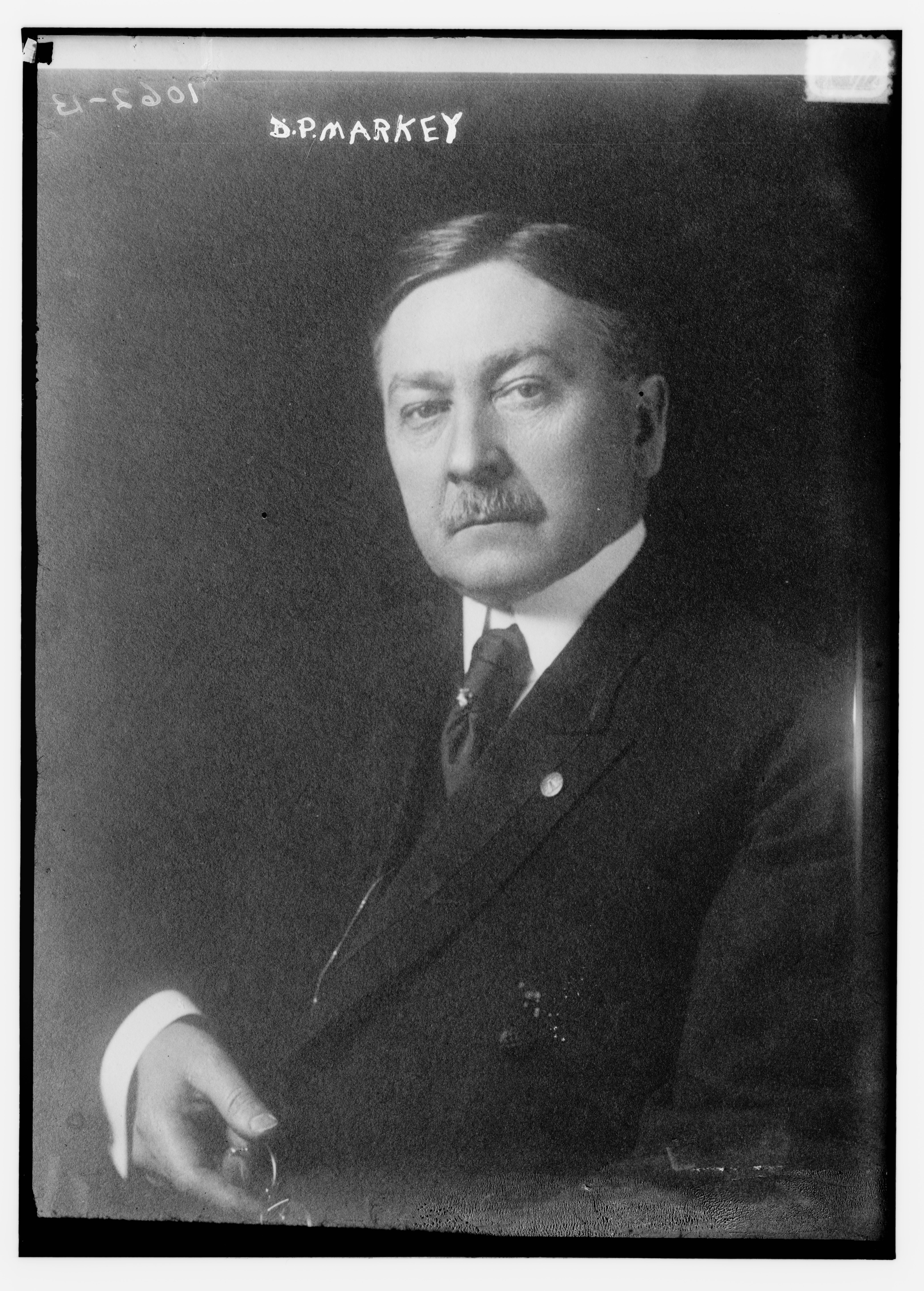

Speaker of the Michigan House of Representatives
- In office January 5, 1887 – 1888
- Preceded by: Newcomb Clark
- Succeeded by: Gerrit J. Diekema

Member of the Michigan House of Representatives from the Ogemaw County district
- In office January 1, 1887 – 1888

Member of the Michigan House of Representatives from the Iosco County district
- In office January 1, 1885 – 1886

Personal details
- Born: June 27, 1857 Bunker Hill Township, Michigan, US
- Died: March 2, 1946 (aged 88) Detroit, Michigan, US
- Party: Republican
- Spouse: Eva Gene Thompson
- Children: 2
- Education: Pinckney High School

Daniel P. Markey (June 27, 1857 – March 2, 1946) was a Michigan politician.

== Early life ==
Markey was born to parents James and Catherine Markey on June 27, 1857, in Bunker Hill Township, Ingham County, Michigan. Markey graduated from Pinckney High School. Markey was admitted to the bar in April 1881. In 1883, Markey was appointed probate judge.

== Personal life ==
Markey married Eva Gene Thompson in 1899. Together they had two children and one step child. Markey was a member of the Knights of the Maccabees.

== Political career ==
Markey was sworn in as a member of the Michigan House of Representatives from the Iosco County district on January 7, 1885. He served in this capacity until 1886. On January 5, 1887, he was sworn in as a member of the Michigan House of Representatives from the Ogemaw County district and served in the seat until 1888. During this term, he was also the Speaker of the Michigan House of Representatives.

== Death ==
Markey died in on March 2, 1946, at a hospital in Detroit. He is interred in Lakeside Cemetery.
