= Roy O. Woodruff =

American politician

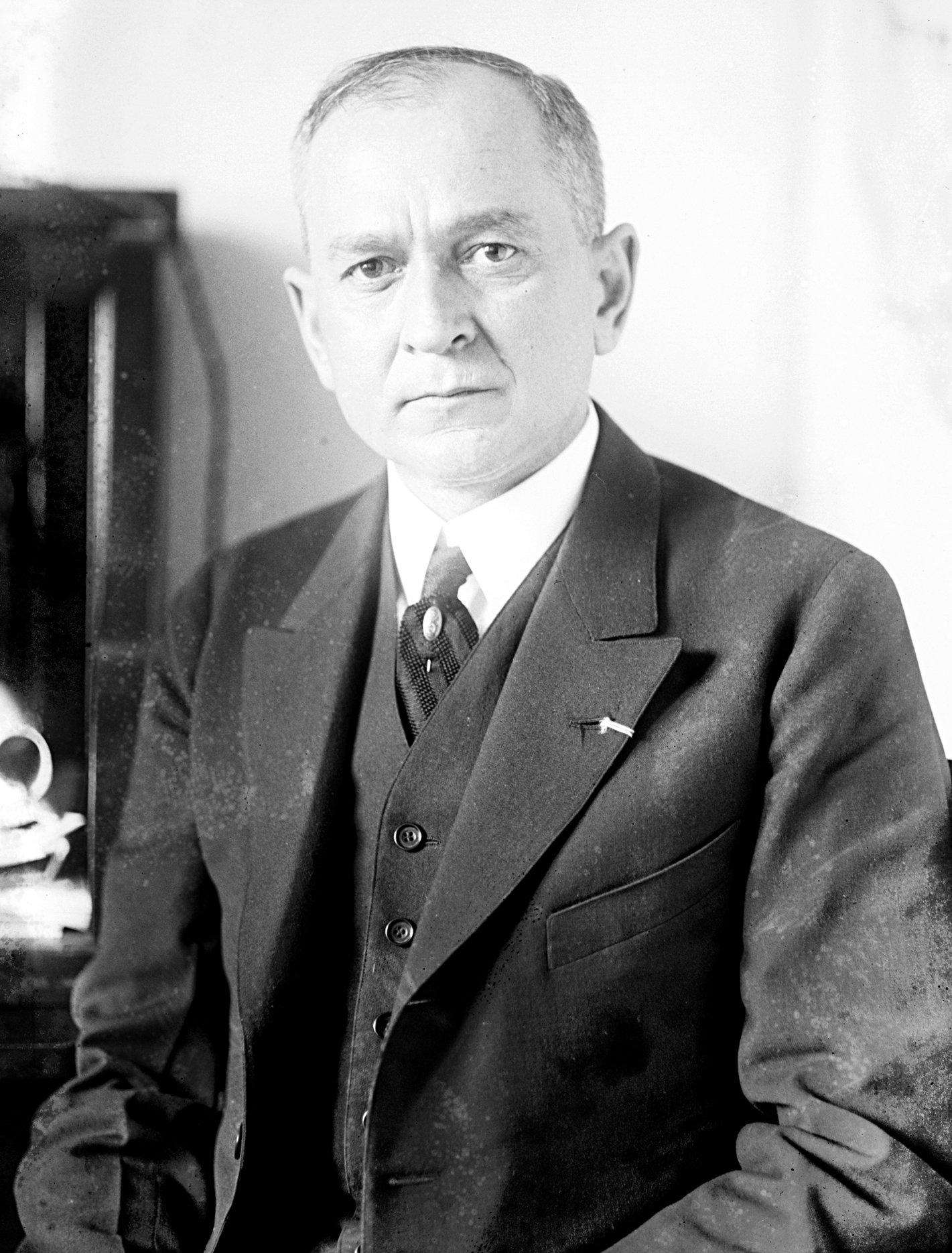

Member of the U.S. House of Representatives from Michigan's 10th district
- In office March 4, 1921 – January 3, 1953
- Preceded by: Gilbert A. Currie
- Succeeded by: Elford Cederberg
- In office March 4, 1913 – March 3, 1915
- Preceded by: George A. Loud
- Succeeded by: George A. Loud

Personal details
- Born: Roy Orchard Woodruff; March 14, 1876 Eaton Rapids, Michigan, US
- Died: February 12, 1953 (aged 76) Washington, D.C., US
- Resting place: Elm Lawn Cemetery
- Education: Detroit College of Medicine

Roy Orchard Woodruff (March 14, 1876 – February 12, 1953) was a politician and soldier from the U.S. state of Michigan. From 1913 to 1915, then again from 1921 to 1953, he served 17 terms in the U.S. House of Representatives.

== Biography ==
Woodruff was born of English and Scottish ancestry to Charles Woodruff and Electa A. (Wallace) Woodruff in Eaton Rapids, Michigan. He attended the common schools and the high school of Eaton Rapids, and apprenticed to the printing business from 1891 to 1899.

He enlisted as a corporal in Company G, Thirty-third Regiment, Michigan Volunteer Infantry, during the Spanish–American War. He saw active service and was mustered out.

Woodruff graduated from the dental department of the Detroit College of Medicine in 1902 and practiced dentistry in Bay City from 1902 to 1911. On 26 April 1905 he married Vera May Hall, the daughter of Michigan Republican State Central Committee member De Vere Hall. He was mayor of Bay City from 1911 to 1913.

=== Congress ===
In 1912, Woodruff defeated incumbent Republican U.S. Representative George A. Loud to be elected as the candidate of the Progressive Party from Michigan's 10th congressional district to the 63rd Congress, serving from March 4, 1913, to March 3, 1915. Woodruff and William J. MacDonald (12th district) were the only two Michiganders elected to the U.S. House from the Progressive Party. He was not a candidate for re-nomination in 1914 and served for two years in the First World War as an Infantry officer, acquiring the rank of major during his service in France.

In 1920, Woodruff returned to Congress, elected as a Republican from the same district to the 67th Congress. He was subsequently re-elected to the fifteen succeeding Congresses, serving from March 4, 1921, to January 3, 1953. On June 11, 1921, just three months after returning to office, he married his second wife Daisy E. Fish. He was re-elected unopposed in 1922 and 1926 and was alternate delegate to Republican National Convention from Michigan in 1940. He was not a candidate for re-nomination in 1952 to the 83rd Congress.

=== Affiliations ===
Roy O. Woodruff was a Baptist, later Presbyterian and a member of the American Dental Association, American Legion, United Spanish War Veterans, Freemasons, Elks, and Odd Fellows.

=== Death and burial ===
He died in Washington, D.C., a little over a month after leaving office and a month before his seventy-seventh birthday. He is interred in Elm Lawn Cemetery of Bay City.

U.S. House of Representatives
Preceded by George A. Loud	United States Representative for the 10th congressional district of Michigan; 1913–1915	Succeeded by George A. Loud
Preceded by Gilbert A. Currie	United States Representative for the 10th congressional district of Michigan; 1921–1953	Succeeded by Elford Cederberg
