= Wade Van Valkenburg =

American politician (1899–1985)

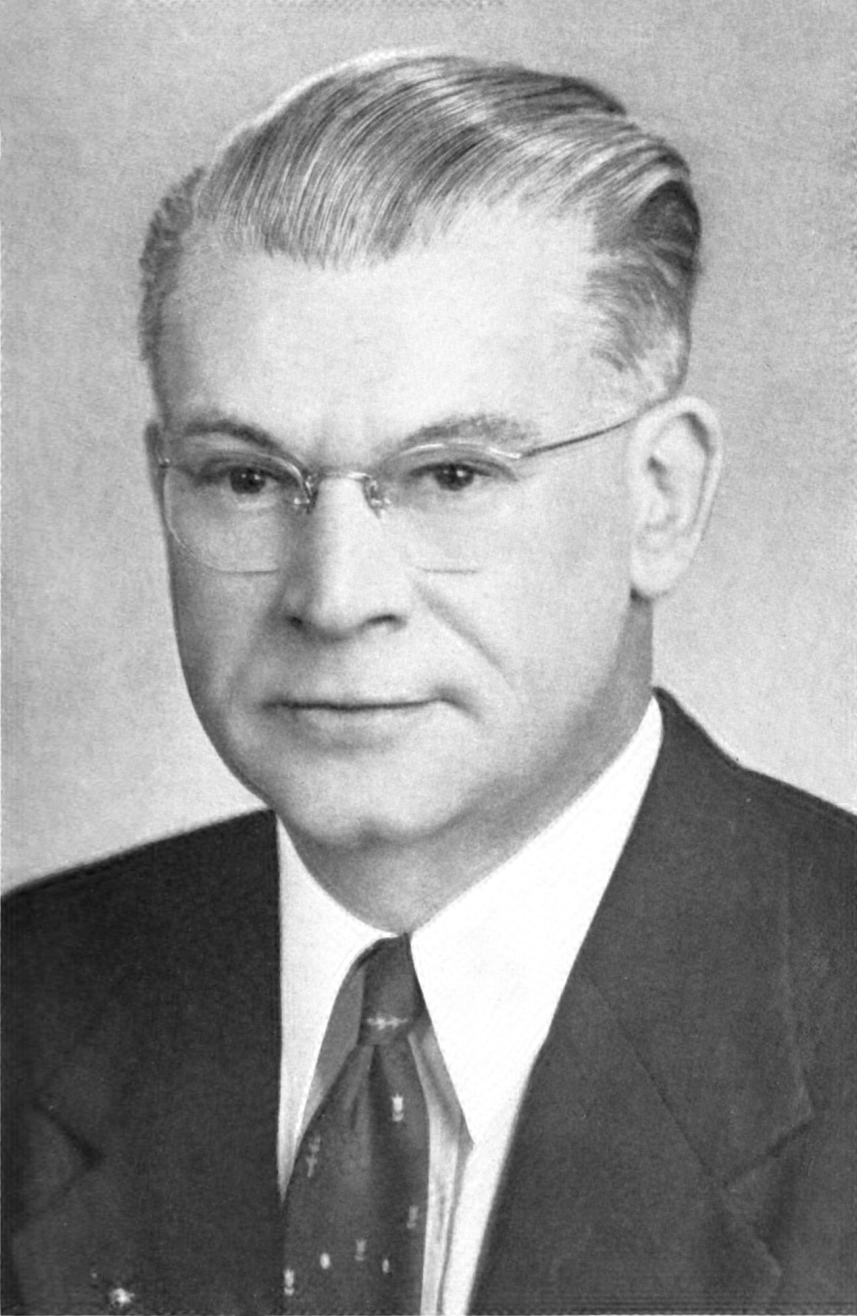

54th Speaker of the Michigan House of Representatives
- In office January 14, 1953 – December 31, 1956
- Governor: G. Mennen Williams
- Preceded by: Victor A. Knox
- Succeeded by: George Van Peursem

Member of the Michigan House of Representatives from the Kalamazoo County 1st district
- In office 1947–1956

Judge for Michigan's 9th Circuit
- In office 1965–1967

Personal details
- Born: January 16, 1899 Tipton, Michigan
- Died: November 20, 1985 (aged 86) Kalamazoo, Michigan
- Party: Republican
- Education: Detroit College of Law; University of Michigan
- Profession: Attorney; Teacher

Military service
- Allegiance: United States of America
- Branch/service: United States Marine Corps
- Battles/wars: World War I

Wade Van Valkenburg (January 16, 1899 – November 20, 1985) was a Republican politician from Michigan who served as the Speaker of the Michigan House of Representatives and as a local judge.

Born in Tipton on January 16, 1899, Van Valkenburg graduated from the University of Michigan and from the then-Detroit College of Law. He served in the United States Marine Corps during World War I.

After losing in the primary election in 1944, Van Valkenburg was elected to represent the 1st Kalamazoo district in the State House in 1946 and served until 1956. He was elected Speaker of the House for his final four years.

Nine years after leaving the House, Van Valkenburg became a circuit judge for Michigan's 9th Circuit, which consists of Kalamazoo County, where he served for three years. He was a member of the Freemasons, the Shriners, Kiwanis, and the American Legion.

Van Valkenburg died on November 20, 1985, in Kalamazoo.

In 2004, the Wade Van Valkenburg Trust established a scholarship program for students in Kalamazoo County who have been found guilty of a criminal offense and who can demonstrate how they have overcome adversity in their life.
