= Henry A. Shaw =

American politician

Speaker of the Michigan House of Representatives
- In office January 5, 1859 – 1860
- Preceded by: Byron G. Stout
- Succeeded by: Dexter Mussey

Member of the Michigan House of Representatives from the Eaton County 1st district
- In office January 1, 1857 – 1860
- In office January 1, 1873 – 1874

Personal details
- Born: June 21, 1818 Vermont
- Died: January 29, 1891 (aged 72) Eaton Rapids, Michigan, US
- Party: Republican

Military service
- Allegiance: United States Army
- Years of service: 1861-1862
- Rank: Major
- Battles/wars: American Civil War

Henry A. Shaw (June 21, 1818 – January 29, 1891) was a Michigan politician.

== Early life ==
Shaw was born on June 21, 1818, in Vermont. He began his law career in Ohio. In 1842, due to health concerns, he moved to Eaton County, Michigan.

== Military career ==
Shaw enlisted in Company B of the Michigan 2nd Cavalry Regiment on October 2, 1861, as a Private. He was promoted to the position of Major on November 12, 1861. He was mustered out on September 3, 1862.

== Political career ==
Shaw was sworn in as a member of the Michigan House of Representatives in 1857 and served until 1860. During this time, he also served as Speaker of the Michigan House of Representatives from 1859 to 1860. After these terms, he was again sworn into the Michigan House of Representatives from 1873 to 1874.

== Death ==
Shaw died in Eaton Rapids, Eaton County, Michigan on January 29, 1891.
