= Newcomb Clark =

American politician (1840–1913)

Speaker of the Michigan House of Representatives
- In office January 7, 1885 – 1886
- Preceded by: Sumner Howard
- Succeeded by: Daniel P. Markey

Member of the Michigan House of Representatives from the Bay County 2nd district
- In office January 1, 1883 – 1886

Personal details
- Born: September 23, 1840 Sullivan County, New York
- Died: 1913 (aged 72–73) Ocean Springs, Mississippi
- Party: Republican

Military service
- Allegiance: United States Army
- Years of service: 1861-1865
- Rank: Lieutenant Colonel
- Battles/wars: American Civil War

Newcomb Clark (September 23, 1840 – 1913) was the Speaker of the Michigan House of Representatives from 1885 to 1886.

== Early life ==
Clark was born in Sullivan County, New York on September 23, 1840. Around 1841, Clark moved to Oxford, Oakland County, Michigan.

== Military career ==
Clark taught in Port Gibson, Mississippi from 1857 to 1861. When the Civil War began, he escaped to the Union and joined the 14th Michigan Volunteer Infantry Regiment. In 1865, Clark was a Lieutenant Colonel.

== Political career ==
After the war, Clark held local offices. On January 3, 1883, Clark was sworn in as a member of the Michigan House of Representatives. In 1885, Clark became the Speaker of the Michigan House of Representatives. He died in Mississippi in 1913.
