= Silas G. Harris =

American politician

Speaker of the Michigan House of Representatives
- In office January 7, 1850 – 1850
- Preceded by: Leander Chapman
- Succeeded by: Jefferson G. Thurber

Member of the Michigan House of Representatives from the Kent and Ottawa County district
- In office January 4, 1847 – 1850

Personal details
- Born: c. 1818
- Died: August 1851 (aged 33) Pine Plains, New York
- Party: Democratic

Silas G. Harris (c. 1818 – August 1851) was the Speaker of the Michigan House of Representatives in 1850.

Concurrently to serving as the Speaker of the Michigan House of Representatives, he served as a member of the Michigan House of Representatives from the Kent and Ottawa County district from January 4, 1847, to 1850. He died in Pine Plains, New York in 1851.
