= George A. Schroeder =

American politician

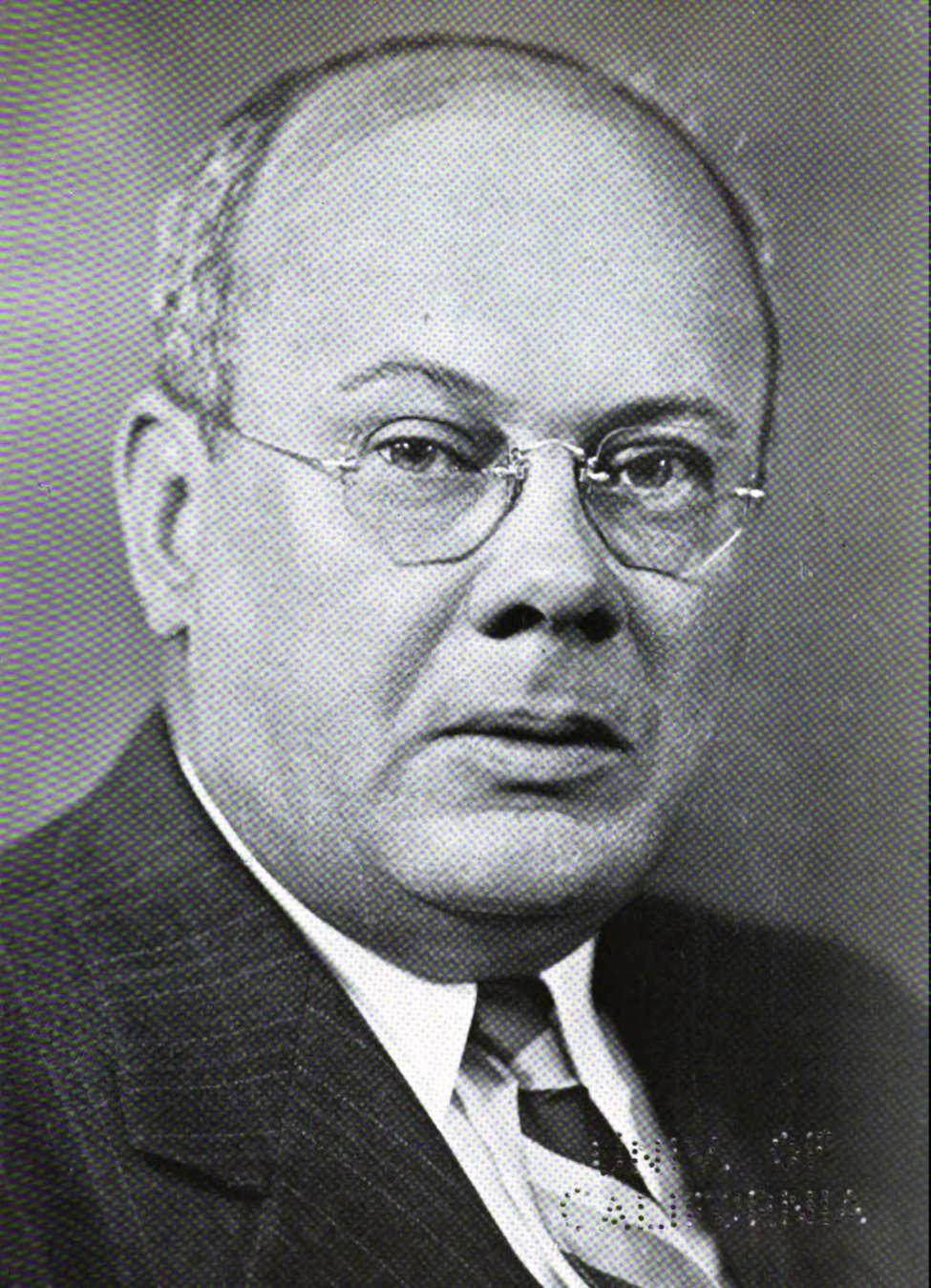

51st Speaker of the Michigan House of Representatives
- In office January 2, 1935 – September 16, 1938
- Preceded by: Martin R. Bradley
- Succeeded by: Howard Nugent

Member of the Michigan House of Representatives from the Wayne County 1st district
- In office 1933–1938

Personal details
- Born: February 21, 1894
- Died: January 10, 1943 (aged 48)
- Party: Democratic
- Spouse: Olive

George A. Schroeder was a Democratic member of the Michigan House of Representatives from 1933 through 1938. He served as Speaker of the House during the 58th and 59th Legislatures.

Born to Christian and Fredericka Schroeder in February 1894, George Schroeder was educated in both public and parochial schools in Detroit. He worked for the Packard Motor Car Company as an engineer for ten years.

Elected to the House in 1932, Schroeder was a supporter of Governor Frank Murphy and the New Deal. He was re-elected twice and served as Speaker for his final four years in the House.

Schroeder was an unsuccessful candidate for lieutenant governor in 1938 and became the manager of the Rural Electrification Administration in Ubly.
