= Cyrus Lovell =

American politician

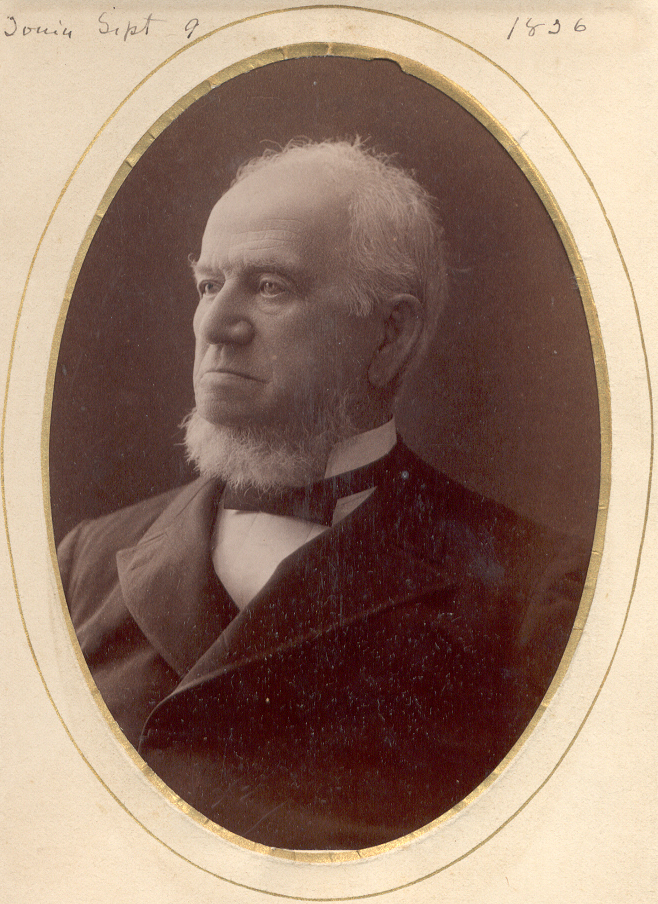

Speaker of the Michigan House of Representatives
- In office January 3, 1855 – 1856
- Preceded by: Daniel G. Quackenboss
- Succeeded by: Byron G. Stout

Member of the Michigan House of Representatives from the Ionia County district
- In office January 1, 1849 – 1849
- In office January 1, 1855 – 1856

Personal details
- Born: September 9, 1804 Grafton, Vermont, US
- Died: April 9, 1895 (aged 90)
- Party: Whig (until 1854); Republican (1854-1860); Democratic (1860-1895)
- Spouse: Louise Fargo

Cyrus "Uncle Cy" Lovell (September 9, 1804 – April 9, 1895) was the Speaker of the Michigan House of Representatives from 1855 to 1856.

== Early life ==
Lovell was born on September 9, 1804, in Grafton, Vermont, to parents Enos and Mary. In 1829, Lovell moved to Ann Arbor, Michigan. He later moved to Kalamazoo, Michigan, where he started his law career, and in 1832 built the first dwelling in Kalamazoo.

== Career ==
In 1836, Lovell moved to Ionia, Michigan, and became the first supervisor of the county. Lovell was sworn in as a member of the Michigan House of Representatives on January 1, 1849, as a Whig. In 1855, and until 1856, served as the Speaker of the Michigan House of Representatives as a Republican. He was the first Republican to do so. In 1850, he was a delegate to Michigan state constitutional convention. In 1860 and onward, Lovell was a Democrat, supporting Stephen A. Douglas' presidential run.

== Personal life ==
Lovell married Louise Fargo in Washtenaw County in 1831, and together they had at least four children.

== Death ==
Lovell died on April 9, 1895. Lovell was interred at Oak Hill Cemetery in Ionia, Michigan.
