= Harold Shaw =

Harold Shaw or Harry Shaw may refer to:

- Harold Shaw (American football) (born 1974), professional American football fullback
- Harold Shaw (racing driver) (1906–1941), American racing driver
- Harold Watkins Shaw (1911–1996), British musicologist and educator
- Harold M. Shaw (1877–1926), American film director

== See also ==
- Harry Shaw (disambiguation)
