= Sheridan F. Master =

American politician

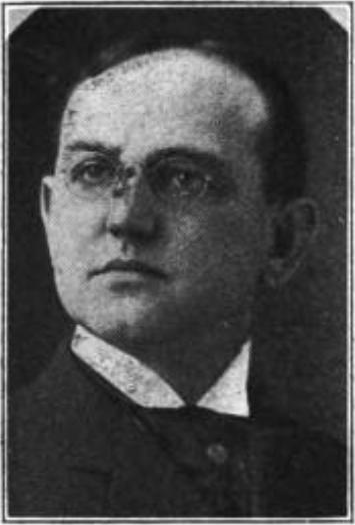

Speaker of the Michigan House of Representatives
- In office January 4, 1905 – 1906
- Preceded by: John J. Carton
- Succeeded by: Nicholas J. Whelan

Member of the Michigan House of Representatives from the Kalamazoo County 1st district
- In office January 1, 1903 – 1906

Personal details
- Born: March 7, 1869 Ontario, Canada
- Died: June 5, 1927 (aged 58) Lansing, Michigan, US
- Party: Republican

Sheridan F. Master (March 7, 1869 – June 5, 1927) was a Michigan politician.

== Early life ==
Master was born on March 7, 1869, in Ontario, Canada to parents Levi and Maria Master.

== Personal life ==
Master married Helen C. Harrison on November 20, 1895, in Chicago, Illinois.

== Career ==
Master served as the Kalamazoo County Prosecuting Attorney from 1901 to 1902. Master was a failed 1905 candidate for circuit judge in Michigan 9th Circuit Court. Master served as a member of the Michigan House of Representatives from the Kalamazoo County 1st district from 1913 to 1918. From 1917 to 1918, he also served as Speaker of the Michigan House of Representatives.

== Death ==
Master died in Lansing, Michigan, on June 5, 1927. He was interred in Oakhill Cemetery in Grand Rapids, Michigan.
