= Charles Wallace Smith =

American politician

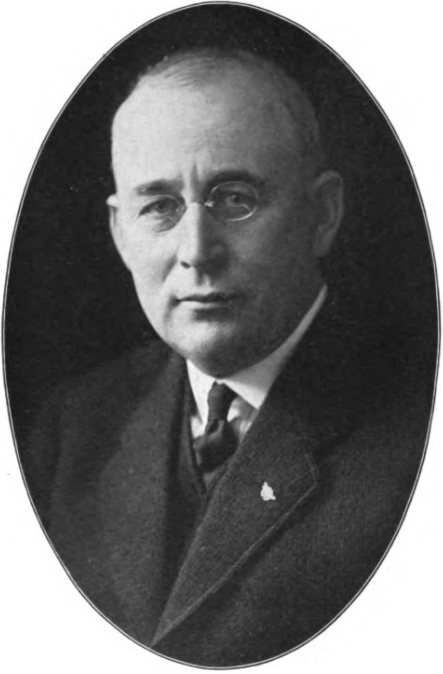

Speaker of the Michigan House of Representatives
- In office January 6, 1915 – 1916
- Preceded by: Gilbert A. Currie
- Succeeded by: Wayne R. Rice

Member of the Michigan House of Representatives from the Lapeer County district
- In office January 1, 1911 – 1916

Personal details
- Born: April 22, 1864 Oregon Township, Michigan
- Died: August 11, 1939 (aged 75) Lapeer, Michigan
- Party: Republican
- Spouse: Betty Snyder (m. 1890)
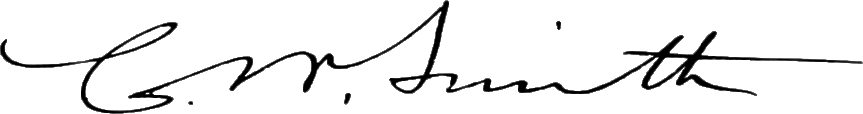
- Signature

Charles Wallace Smith (April 22, 1864 – August 11, 1939) was a state legislator in Michigan. He served as Speaker of the Michigan House of Representatives from 1915 to 1916. He was a Republican.

== Early life ==
Smith was born on April 22, 1864, in Oregon Township, Michigan, to parents Hiram and Ann Smith.

== Career ==
Before being elected to the legislature, Smith worked as treasurer-secretary for the Lapeer Gas-Electric Company. In the state legislature, Smith represented Lapeer County from 1911 to 1916. From 1915 to 1916, he also served as Speaker of the Michigan House of Representatives. Smith was the alternate delegate to the Republican National Convention from Michigan in 1912 and 1920. Smith was an unsuccessful candidate in the 1924 primary for the Michigan Senate from the 24th District.

== Personal life ==
Smith married Betty Snyder in 1890.

== Death ==
Smith died at his home in Lapeer on August 11, 1939.
