= Harry Shaw (footballer) =

English footballer

Harry Shaw (22 May 1905 – 14 June 1984) was an English footballer who played for Sunderland as a full-back. He was born in Hednesford, Staffordshire, England.

== Club career ==
Staffordshire-born left back Harry Shaw played for Hednesford Town in 1922 before joining recently relegated local professional club Wolverhampton Wanderers in the summer of 1923. He made his Football League debut at Chesterfield FC the same August and immediately become a first-team regular at Molineux Stadium. In his first season, he played 37 League matches as Wolves won the Third Division (North) Championship and gained immediate promotion back to the Second Division. He continued as a regular in the Wolves first team until February 1930, when he was signed by First Division Sunderland after 249 appearances for Wolves. He made his debut for Sunderland against Newcastle United on 22 February 1930 in a 3–0 defeat at St. James' Park. He played for Sunderland from 1930 until 1935, making 195 league appearances and scoring 4 goals.
