= Herbert F. Baker =

American politician (1862–1930)

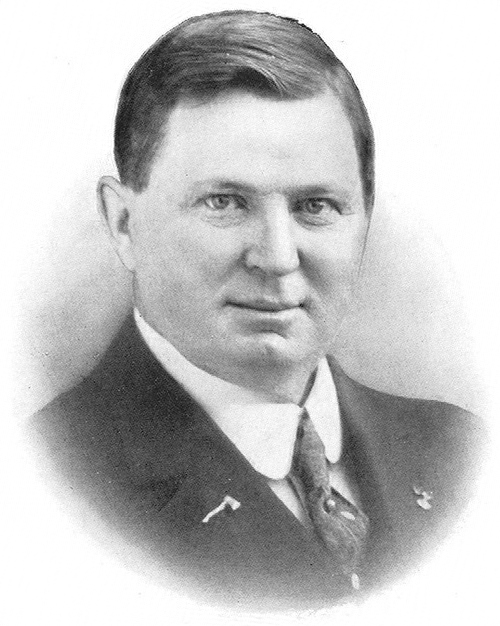

Member of the Michigan Senate from the 29th district
- In office January 1, 1919 – 1922
- Preceded by: J. Lee Morford
- Succeeded by: William J. Pearson

Speaker of the Michigan House of Representatives
- In office 1911–1912
- Preceded by: Colin P. Campbell
- Succeeded by: Gilbert A. Currie

Member of the Michigan House of Representatives from the Cheboygan County district
- In office January 1, 1907 – 1912

Personal details
- Born: January 13, 1862 Dover Township, Lenawee County, Michigan
- Died: January 4, 1930 (aged 67) Cheboygan, Michigan
- Party: Republican; Progressive (1912-1914)
- Children: 2

Herbert F. Baker (January 13, 1862 – January 4, 1930) was an American politician who served in the Michigan Legislature.

== Early life ==
Baker was born on January 13, 1862, in Dover Township, Lenawee County, Michigan.

== Career ==
Baker moved to Cheboygan County, Michigan in 1889 as a farmer. Baker served as a member of the Michigan House of Representatives from 1907 to 1912 as a Republican. During his last term, he served as Speaker of the Michigan House of Representatives. In 1912, Baker was a failed Progressive Party candidate for Michigan Auditor General. In 1914, he was again a failed Progressive candidate, this time for Michigan's 11th congressional district. Baker then won the Michigan State Senate 29th District election in 1918 and served in this capacity from 1919 to 1922. In the Michigan Senate, he served as a Republican. After this, Baker would go on to run in two Republican primaries, first running for the United States Senate seat in 1922 then for Michigan governorship in 1924. He would fail in both of these primaries.

== Personal life ==
Baker was married, and had two children. Baker was a member of the Grange, the Elks, and the Woodmen.

== Death ==
Baker died on January 4, 1930, in Cheboygan, Michigan.
