= Harry Shaw (ice hockey) =

Canadian ice hockey player

- Born: September 19, 1943 (age 82) Rouyn-Noranda, Quebec, Canada
- Height: 5 ft 11 in (180 cm)
- Weight: 165 lb (75 kg; 11 st 11 lb)
- Position: Defence
- Shot: Left
- Played for: Phoenix Roadrunners
- NHL draft: Undrafted
- Playing career: 1964–1980

Harry Shaw (born September 19, 1943) is a Canadian retired professional ice hockey defenceman.

Shaw played 15 seasons of professional hockey, including five seasons (318 regular season and 28 playoff games) in the AHL.
