= Michigan Legislative Council =

Michigan Legislative Council is a bipartisan, bicameral body of legislators established in Article IV, Section 15 of the Constitution of the State of Michigan.

== Composition ==
The Speaker of the Michigan House of Representatives and the Senate Majority Leader each appoint six members of their chamber, at least two of each body must be members of the minority party, and three alternates each. The Constitution directs the legislature to appropriate funds for the Legislative Council's operations which include providing bill drafting, research, and other services to the members of the legislature.
