= Jefferson G. Thurber =

American politician

16th Speaker of the Michigan House of Representatives
- In office February 5, 1851 – June 28, 1851
- Preceded by: Silas G. Harris
- Succeeded by: Daniel G. Quackenboss

Member of the Michigan House of Representatives from the Monroe County district
- In office February 5, 1851 – January 5, 1853
- Preceded by: Norman Barnes
- Succeeded by: Alfred G. Bates

Member of the Michigan Senate from the 3rd district
- In office January 1, 1844 – March 17, 1847
- Succeeded by: N. Dunham

Personal details
- Born: December 30, 1807 Unity, New Hampshire, U.S.
- Died: May 6, 1857 (aged 49) Monroe, Michigan, U.S.
- Resting place: Woodland Cemetery, Monroe, Michigan
- Party: Democratic
- Spouse: Mary Bartlett Gerrish (m. 1834–1857)
- Children: Henry Thurber^{(b. 1834; died 1835)}; Edward Gerrish Thurber^{(b. 1836; died 1913)}; Elizabeth J. (Wing)^{(b. 1842; died 1920)}; Jefferson Mann Thurber^{(b. 1843; died 1930)}; Thomas Thurber^{(b. 1849; died 1849)}; Julia Thurber^{(b. 1851; died 1945)}
- Parents: Samuel Hallet Thurber (father); Sarah (Gage) Thurber (mother)
- Relatives: Samuel H. Thurber (half-brother)
- Education: Canandaigua Academy
- Profession: Lawyer

Jefferson Gage Thurber (December 30, 1807 – May 6, 1857) was an American lawyer, Democratic Party politician, and Michigan pioneer. He was a member of the Michigan Senate and House of Representatives, and served as the 16th speaker of the Michigan House of Representatives in 1851.

== Biography ==
Jefferson G. Thurber was born in Unity, New Hampshire, and while a child moved to Canandaigua, New York, with his parents. He received his education at the Canandaigua Academy, then taught Latin and mathematics while studying law.

In 1833, he went west to the Michigan Territory and started a legal practice in Monroe, where he resided for most of the rest of his life. He quickly became involved in politics, and was elected prosecuting attorney and then probate judge. In 1843, he was elected to the Michigan Senate and served three years as one of the representatives in the 3rd Senate district (in this era Michigan's senators were elected in multi-member districts). He was subsequently elected to a single term in the Michigan House of Representatives, representing Monroe County in the 1851 session, and he was chosen as speaker of the House for that session. He was also a delegate to the 1856 Democratic National Convention which nominated James Buchanan over the incumbent, President Franklin Pierce.

He died at his home in Monroe on May 6, 1857.

== Personal life and family ==
Jefferson G. Thurber was the second child and eldest son of Samuel Hallet Thurber and his first wife, Sara (née Gage) Thurber. Several of Thurber's siblings also moved to Michigan and prospered.

Jefferson Thurber married Mary Bartlett Gerrish in 1834, they had at least eight children, though two died in infancy.

Michigan House of Representatives
Preceded by Norman Barnes	Member of the Michigan House of Representatives from the Monroe County district February 5, 1851 – January 5, 1853	Succeeded by Alfred G. Bates
Preceded by Silas G. Harris	Speaker of the Michigan House of Representatives; February 5, 1851 – June 28, 1851	Succeeded by Daniel G. Quackenboss
