= Dexter Mussey =

American politician (1811–1890)

- Born: Dexter Muzzy; January 12, 1811; Rutland, Massachusetts U.S.
- Died: June 29, 1890 (aged 79)
- Occupations: Politician; Businessman
- Spouse: Lydia Russell (m. 1836)

Dexter Mussey (born January 12, 1811 - June 29, 1890) was a Republican politician from the U.S. state of Michigan. He represented Macomb County in the Michigan House of Representatives for many years and served as Speaker of the House, 1861-62.

Mussey was born in Rutland, Worcester County, Massachusetts, the son of Eli Muzzy and Persis Prouty. His mother was descended from Resolved White, who was a Mayflower passenger. He received a common school education and spent five years in Lowell, Massachusetts. He worked as a teacher, then a clerk, and then in business for himself. He settled in Romeo, Michigan in 1837. He was in business as a merchant, blacksmith, wagon maker, farming, and a foundry. In 1836, he was married to Lydia Russell (1812–1895) in Lowell. Dexter and Lydia had six children: Nathan, Maryette, George, Martha, Harvey Eli and Josephine. Family history has it that he changed his name from Muzzy to Mussey because writing the letter z was too cumbersome.

When the village of Romeo incorporated in 1838, Mussey became a Trustee in the first election. According to the 1840 US Census, he lived in Washington in Macomb County, Michigan.

He became a justice of the peace of Macomb County in 1845. He served in the Michigan House of Representatives from 1855 through 1862 and served as Speaker of the House in 1861-62. He was a delegate to the 1867 Michigan Constitutional Convention.

In 1839 and 1844 Mussey ran as an unsuccessful Whig Party candidate for Michigan House of Representatives. In 1850, he was an unsuccessful Whig candidate to the State Constitutional Convention of that year.

In 1854, Mussey ran as a candidate for the newly formed Republican Party, and won the election to the Michigan House of Representatives, and again in 1856, 1858, and 1860.

With the outbreak of the Civil War, Mussey was appointed Commissioner to carry out the draft ordered by the War Department on July 9, 1861. He carried out another draft in February 1863.

In addition to serving in various civil offices in the village of Romeo and the state government, Mussey was a Deacon in the Congregational Church of Romeo.

Mussey Township in St. Clair County was named for Mussey.
