= 1946 in Michigan =

- Decades: 1920s; 1930s; 1940s; 1950s; 1960s
- See also: History of Michigan; Historical outline of Michigan; List of years in Michigan; 1946 in the United States

Events from the year 1946 in Michigan included the emergence of anti-graft crusader Kim Sigler and his election as governor, a strike by the United Auto Workers, and supply-chain problems that slowed production in the automobile industry. The year's major sports stories included the 1946 Detroit Tigers finishing second in the American League with Hal Newhouser winning 26 games and finishing second in voting for the most valuable player award. Notable deaths in 1946 included former Michigan football coach Fielding H. Yost. Notable births in Michigan included comedienne and actress Gilda Radner and writer/director Paul Schrader

== Top stories ==
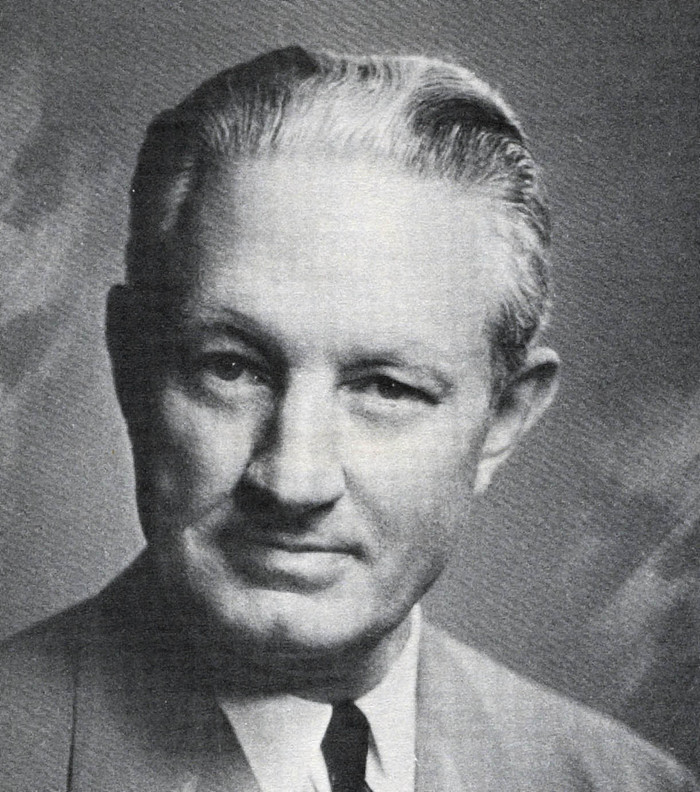
Kim Sigler

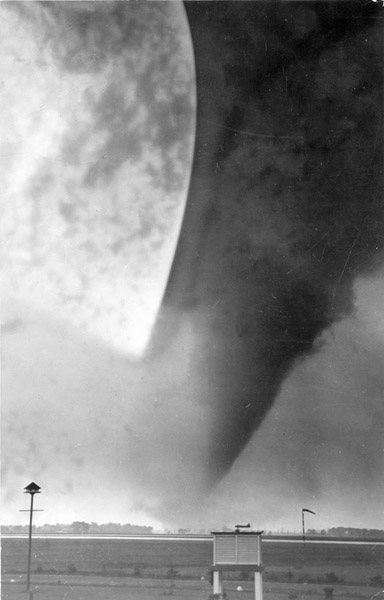
1946 Windsor–Tecumseh tornado

The Associated Press polled editors of its member newspapers in Michigan and ranked the state's top news stories of 1946 as follows:

1. Kim Sigler. Kim Sigler began the year as special prosecutor pursuing government corruption. After 28 months in that position, he was fired in March 1946. A former Democrat, he won the Republican nomination for governor in a four-way contest. He then won the general election in November by more than 350,000 votes, the largest margin for a Michigan governor in a non-presidential year.
2. UAW strike. In January, Chrysler and Ford settled their part in the United Auto Workers (UAW) strike of 1945–1946. The last to settle was General Motors on March 13, ending a strike by 175,000 production workers that had lasted for 113 days since November 21, 1945.
3. Production problems in the automobile industry. Reduced production was attributed to factors including Office of Price Administration (OPA) price controls on new automobiles (which were finally lifted in November), the UAW strike, and strikes against automobile parts suppliers and in the steel, coal, rail, and Great Lakes shipping industries.
4. Tornadoes. Two large tornadoes in June 1946 struck Detroit and Windsor, Ontario, the most devastating being the 1946 Windsor–Tecumseh tornado
5. Bank bribery scandal. On July 20, 19 men including the president of Michigan National Bank, were indicted for conspiring to block passage of Michigan's anti-branch bank bill.
6. Jackson Prison scandal. In April, a hearing for reinstatement of the fired warden of the Jackson State Prison revealed extensive corruption at the prison, including bribes for whisky, more favorable work assignments, and visits to a house of ill fame.
7. Frank McKay trial. Former Republican national committeeman Frank McKay and four others were tried in January and February on charges of corrupting the state liquor control commission. After a month of trial, the judge granted a directed verdict and dismissed the charges. The case had been prosecuted by Kim Sigler.
8. Baroda school explosion. The November 13 explosion of a water tank at a school in Baroda, killing one child and endangering 260.
9. Cardinal Mooney. On February 18, Detroit Archbishop Edward Aloysius Mooney was elevated by the pope to the status of cardinal. He was the first cardinal in Michigan.
10. Destruction of cottages near Bay City. On March 9, strong winds from a blizzard pushed massive ice floes from Saginaw Bay onto Killarney and Ricomo Beaches near Bay City. The ice reached heights of 40 feet along a two-mile stretch of beach, crushing 100 cottages.

Other stories receiving votes but falling outside the top ten included the following:

- The National Maritime Union's Great Lakes shipping strike;
- OPA exposure of a $3 million black market for cars based in Michigan;
- The trial and conviction of Anthony Lobaido for the rape and slashing of a Detroit child; and
- Celebration of the Detroit Automobile Golden Jubilee.

== Office holders ==
=== State office holders ===
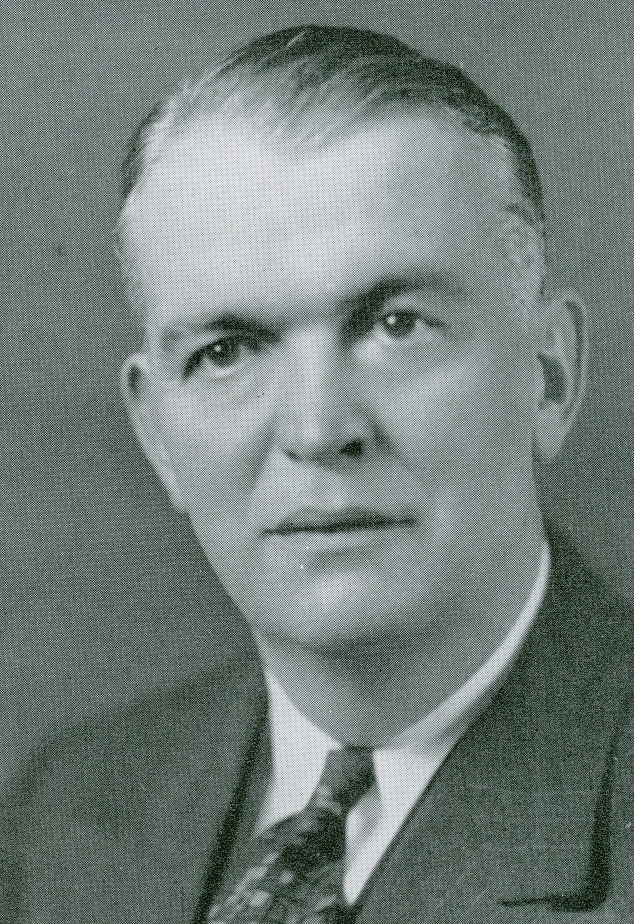
Harry Kelly

- Governor of Michigan: Harry Kelly (Republican)
- Lieutenant Governor of Michigan: Vernon J. Brown (Republican)
- Michigan Attorney General: John R. Dethmers (Republican)/Foss O. Eldred (Republican)
- Michigan Secretary of State: Herman H. Dignan (Republican)
- Speaker of the Michigan House of Representatives: Howard Nugent (Republican)
- Chief Justice, Michigan Supreme Court: Henry M. Butzel

=== Mayors of major cities ===
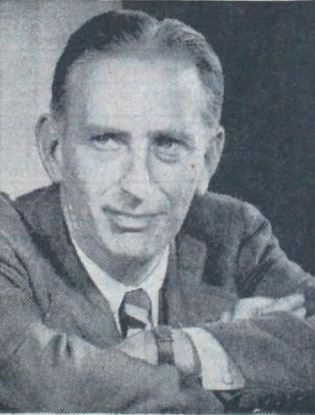
Edward Jeffries

- Mayor of Detroit: Edward Jeffries (Republican)
- Mayor of Grand Rapids: George W. Welsh (Republican)
- Mayor of Flint: Edwin C. McLogan/Edward J. Viall
- Mayor of Dearborn: Orville L. Hubbard
- Mayor of Saginaw: Harold J. Stenglein
- Mayor of Lansing: Ralph Crego
- Mayor of Ann Arbor: William E. Brown Jr.

=== Federal office holders ===
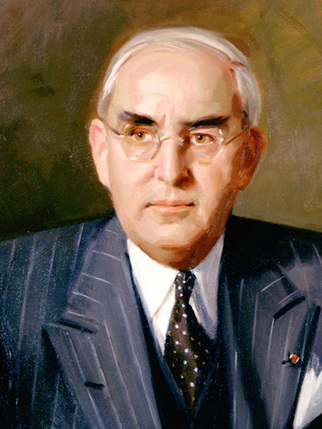
Arthur Vandenberg

- U.S. Senator from Michigan: Homer S. Ferguson (Republican)
- U.S. Senator from Michigan: Arthur Vandenberg (Republican)
- House District 1: George G. Sadowski (Democrat)
- House District 2: Earl C. Michener (Republican)
- House District 3: Paul W. Shafer (Republican)
- House District 4: Clare Hoffman (Republican)
- House District 5: Bartel J. Jonkman (Republican)
- House District 6: William W. Blackney (Republican)
- House District 7: Jesse P. Wolcott (Republican)
- House District 8: Fred L. Crawford (Republican)
- House District 9: Albert J. Engel (Republican)
- House District 10: Roy O. Woodruff (Republican)
- House District 11: Frederick Van Ness Bradley (Republican)
- House District 12: Frank Eugene Hook (Democrat)
- House District 13: George D. O'Brien (Democrat)
- House District 14: Louis C. Rabaut (Democrat)
- House District 15: John D. Dingell Sr. (Democrat)
- House District 16: John Lesinski Sr. (Democrat)
- House District 17: George Anthony Dondero (Republican)

== Population ==
In the 1940 United States census, Michigan was recorded as having a population of 5,256,106, ranking as the seventh most populous state in the country. By 1950, Michigan's population had increased by 21.2% to 6,371,766.

=== Cities ===
The following is a list of cities in Michigan with a population of at least 20,000 based on 1940 U.S. Census data. Historic census data from 1930 and 1950 is included to reflect trends in population increases or decreases. Cities that are part of the Detroit metropolitan area are shaded in tan.

1940 Rank	City	County	1940 Pop.	1946 Est.	1950 Pop.	Change 1940-50
1	Detroit	Wayne	1,623,452	1,815,000	1,849,568	13.9%
2	Grand Rapids	Kent	164,292		176,515	7.4%
3	Flint	Genesee	151,543		163,143	7.7%
4	Saginaw	Saginaw	82,794		92,918	12.2%
5	Lansing	Ingham	78,753	90,000	92,129	17.0%
6	Pontiac	Oakland	66,626		73,681	10.6%
7	Dearborn	Wayne	63,589		94,994	49.4%
8	Kalamazoo	Kalamazoo	54,097		57,704	6.7%
9	Highland Park	Wayne	50,810		46,393	−8.7%
10	Hamtramck	Wayne	49,839	48,938	43,555	−12.6%
11	Jackson	Jackson	49,656		51,088	2.9%
12	Bay City	Bay	47,956		52,523	9.5%
13	Muskegon	Muskegon	47,697		48,429	1.5%
14	Battle Creek	Calhoun	43,453		48,666	12.0%
15	Port Huron	St. Clair	32,759		35,725	9.1%
16	Wyandotte	Wayne	30,618		36,846	20.3%
17	Ann Arbor	Washtenaw	29,815		48,251	61.8%
18	Royal Oak	Oakland	25,087		46,898	86.9%
19	Ferndale	Oakland	22,523		29,675	31.8%

=== Counties ===
The following is a list of counties in Michigan with populations of at least 75,000 based on 1940 U.S. Census data. Historic census data from 1930 and 1950 are included to reflect trends in population increases or decreases.

1940 Rank	County	Largest city	1930 Pop.	1940 Pop.	1950 Pop.	Change 1940-50
1	Wayne	Detroit	1,888,946	2,015,623	2,435,235	20.8%
2	Oakland	Pontiac	211,251	254,068	396,001	55.9%
3	Kent	Grand Rapids	240,511	246,338	288,292	17.0%
4	Genesee	Flint	211,641	227,944	270,963	18.9%
5	Ingham	Lansing	116,587	130,616	172,941	32.4%
6	Saginaw	Saginaw	120,717	130,468	153,515	17.7%
7	Macomb	Warren	77,146	107,638	184,961	71.8%
8	Kalamazoo	Kalamazoo	91,368	100,085	126,707	26.6%
9	Jackson	Jackson	92,304	93,108	108,168	16.2%
10	Muskegon	Muskegon	84,630	94,501	121,545	28.6%
11	Calhoun	Battle Creek	87,043	94,206	120,813	28.2%

== Companies ==
The following is a list of major companies based in Michigan in 1946.

Company	1946 sales (millions)	1946 net earnings (millions)	Headquarters	Core business
General Motors			Detroit	Automobiles
Ford Motor Company	na	na		Automobiles
Chrysler				Automobiles
Studebaker Corp.				Automobiles
Briggs Mfg. Co.			Detroit	Automobile parts supplier
S. S. Kresge				Retail
Hudson Motor Car Co.			Detroit	Automobiles
Detroit Edison				Electric utility
Michigan Bell				Telephone utility
Kellogg's			Battle Creek	Breakfast cereal
Parke-Davis			Detroit	Pharmaceutical
REO Motor Car Co.			Lansing	Automobiles
Burroughs Adding Machine				Business machines

Also in 1946, Avis Car Rental was founded by Warren Avis in Ypsilanti, Michigan.

== Sports ==
=== Baseball ===
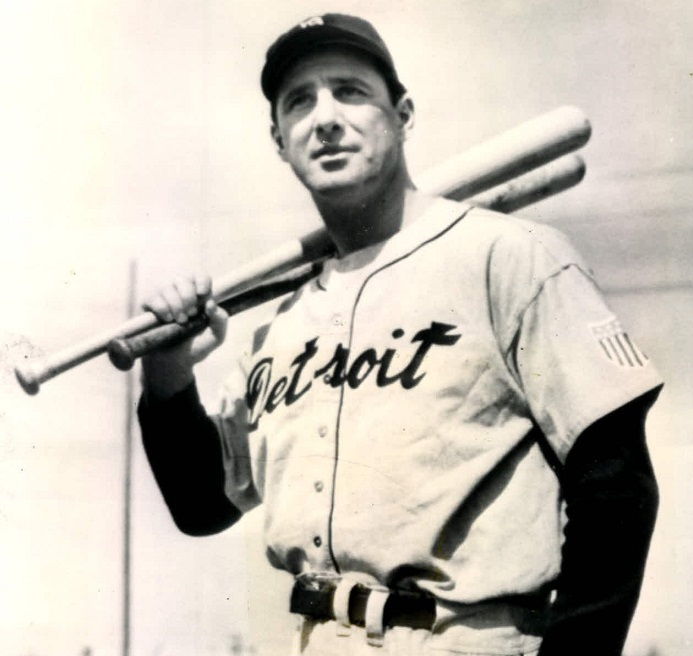
Hank Greenberg, 1946

- 1946 Detroit Tigers season – Under manager Steve O'Neill, the Tigers compiled a 92–62 record and finished second in the American League. The team's statistical leaders included Roy Cullenbine with a .335 batting average and Hank Greenberg with 44 home runs and 127 RBIs. Hal Newhouser led the pitching staff with a 26–9 record and a 1.94 ERA. Newhouser finished second in the MVP voting behind Ted Williams.
- 1946 Michigan Wolverines baseball season - Under head coach Ray Fisher, the Wolverines compiled an 18–3 record and finished second in the Big Ten Conference. Bliss Bowman was the team captain.

=== American football ===
- 1946 Detroit Lions season – The Lions compiled a 1–10 and finished last in the NFL Western Division.
- 1946 Michigan Wolverines football team – Led by head coach Fritz Crisler, the Wolverines compiled a 6–2–1 record and were ranked No. 6 in the final AP poll. Statistical leaders included Bob Chappuis with 735 passing yards and 548 rushing yards.
- 1946 Michigan State Spartans football team – Under head coach Charlie Bachman, the Spartans compiled a 5–3–1 record.
- 1946 Detroit Titans football team – Under head coach Chuck Baer, the Titans compiled a 6–4 record.
- 1946 Central Michigan Chippewas football team - Under head coach Ron Finch, the Chippewas compiled a 6–2 record.
- 1946 Western Michigan Broncos football team - Under head coach John Gill, the Broncos compiled a 5–2–1 record.
- 1946 Michigan Tech Huskies football team - Under head coach Rex Benoit, the Huskies compiled a 3–2 record.
- 1946 Michigan State Normal Hurons football team - Under head coach Elton Rynearson, the Hurons compiled a 3–4–1 record.
- 1946 Michigan Intercollegiate Athletic Association football season - The Hilllsdale Dales and Kalamazoo Hornets tied for the MIAC championship.

=== Basketball ===
- 1945–46 Michigan Wolverines men's basketball team – Under head coach Bennie Oosterbaan, the Wolverines compiled a 12–7 record. Dave Strack was the team captain. Glen Selbo was the leading scorer.

=== Ice hockey ===
- 1945–46 Detroit Red Wings season – The Red Wings compiled a 20–20–10 record and finished fourth in the NHL. The team's statistical leaders included Joe Carveth with 35 points and 18 assists and Adam Brown with 20 goals.

=== Boxing ===
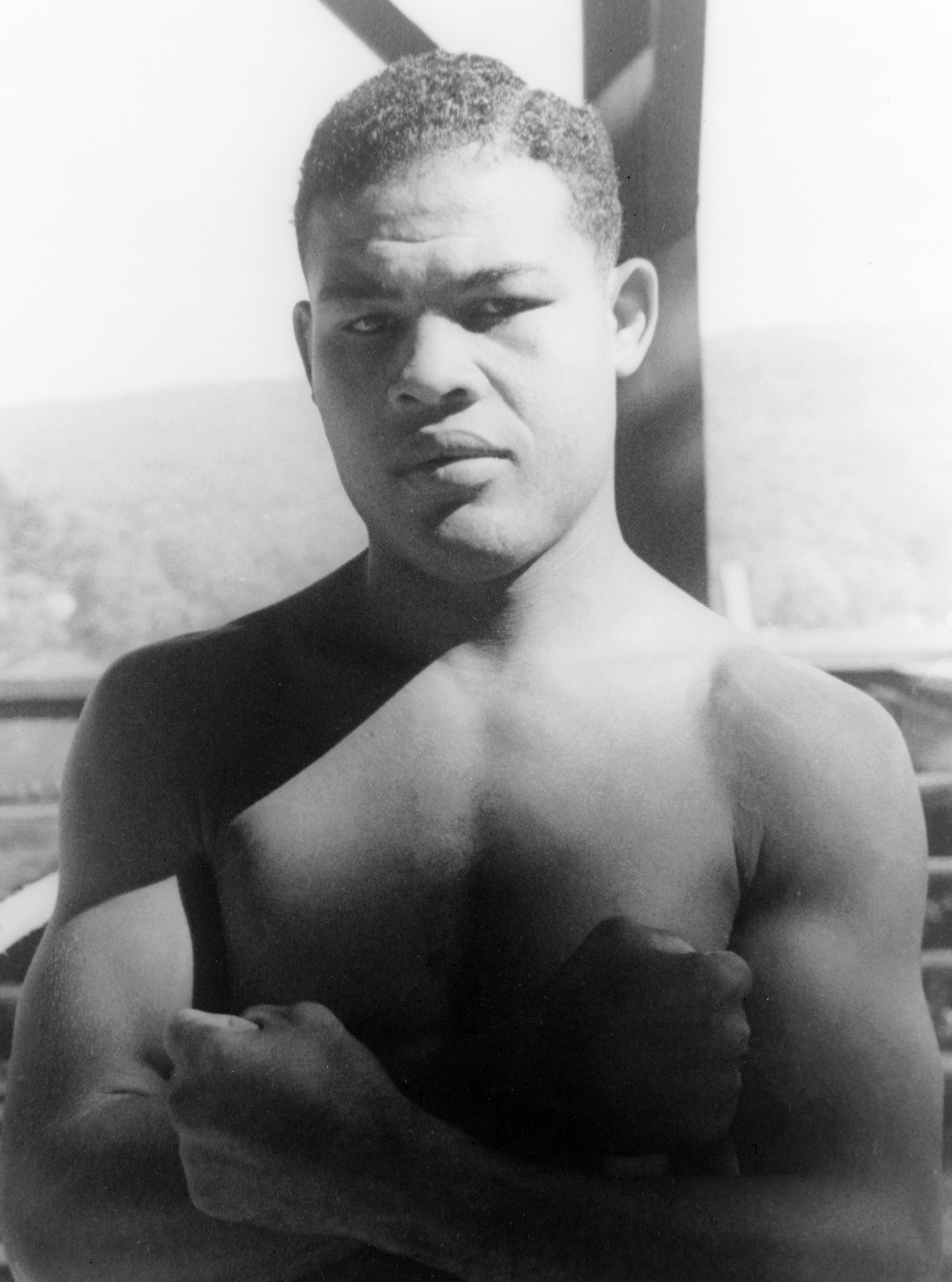
Joe Louis

- June 19 - Detroit's Joe Louis defeated Billy Conn at Yankee stadium to retain his world heavyweight championship.
- September 18 - Joe Louis defeated Tami Mauriello before a crowd of 38,494 in New York. The fight lasted only two minutes and nine seconds.

=== Boat racing ===
- APBA Gold Cup – Bandleader Guy Lombardo, racing in his boat, the Tempo VI, won the American Power Boat Association's Gold Cup boat race on the Detroit River.
- Port Huron to Mackinac Boat Race –

=== Golfing ===
- Michigan Open - Chuck Kocsis won the Michigan Open golf tournament, held at the Black River Country Club course in Port Huron, Michigan.

== Chronology of events ==
=== January ===
- January 3 - The Detroit Tigers traded Rudy York to the Boston Red Sox in exchange for Eddie Lake
- January 26 - Ford and Chrysler reach agreements with the UAW raising wages by 18-1/2 cents per hour at Chrysler and 18 cents an hour at Ford. The strike continued as to GM with Walter Reuther declaring that the UAW would not settle for less than 19-1/2 cents from GM.

=== February ===
- February 13 - Judge John Simpson freed former state Republican Party boss Frank D. McKay and four others, granting a directed verdict after a month-long trial of the five men on charges of corruption in the administration of the state's liquor control commission. The case had been prosecuted by Kim Sigler who was elected as Michigan governor nine months later.
- February 18 - Edward Aloysius Mooney, archbishop of Detroit, was elevated in Rome by Pope Pius XII to the Sacred College of Cardinals. He became Detroit's first cardinal.
- February 18 - Detroit Tigers slugger Hank Greenberg disclosed his wedding to heiress Caral Glazier Gimbel, daughter of the New York department store owner.

=== March ===
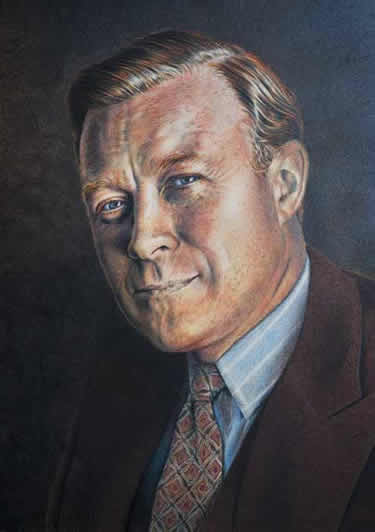
Walter Reuther

- March - R. J. Thomas and Walter Reuther engage in a bitter struggle for control of the UAW. Reuther vowed to fight communists within the union. Reuther was elected on March 27 by a narrow margin to replace Thomas as president and made plea for unity. He vowed that no outside groups of Communists, Trotskyites, or Socialists would be allowed to dictate to the union during his leadership. However, the Thomas-Addes faction maintained control of the union's executive board.
- March 9 - Strong winds pushed ice flows onto the Killarney and Ricomo Beaches on Saginaw Bay, five miles north of Bay City. The ice reached heights of 40 feet along a two-mile stretch of beach, crushing 100 cottages.
- March 12 - Kim Sigler was fired as special prosecutor by Judge Louis E. Coash. Sigler had been the Ingham County grand jury special prosecutor for two years. Despite the termination, Sigler was elected as governor in November. One week earlier, Sigler had announced his intention to petition to remove Coach from his supervisory role in Sigler's graft probe.
- March 13 - General Motors reached a settlement with the CIO United Auto Workers, ending the United Auto Workers (UAW) strike of 1945–1946 by 175,000 production workers at the world's largest automobile manufacturer that had lasted for 113 days since November 21, 1945. Workers received a wage rate increase of 18.5 cents (17.5%).

=== April ===
- April - The Detroit Street Railroad (DSR) was shut down during the first week of the month by a strike. Workers received a 15-cent wage increase.
- April - The state civil service commission heard the request for reinstatement by former Michigan prison warden Harry H. Jackson. The hearing brought to light evidence of widespread corruption, including bribes for more favorable work assignments, whisky, marijuana, and visits to a house of ill fame.
- April 16 - The Detroit Tigers won on opening day, defeating the St. Louis Browns before a record crowd of 52,118 at Briggs Stadium. Hal Newhouser pitched a sis-hitter, and Hank Greenberg hit a home run.
- April 25 - Frank Lobaido was tried and convicted in Detroit for the rape and attempted murder of seven-year-old Rosalie Giganti on January 27 in the backroom of the Detroit grocery store where Lobaido worked. Lobaido slit the girl's throat and left her in a garage can, but she survived the attack, prayed as she crawled out of the garbage can, and identified Lobaido as her assailant. The jury deliberated for only 12 minutes before convicting Lobaido.

=== May ===
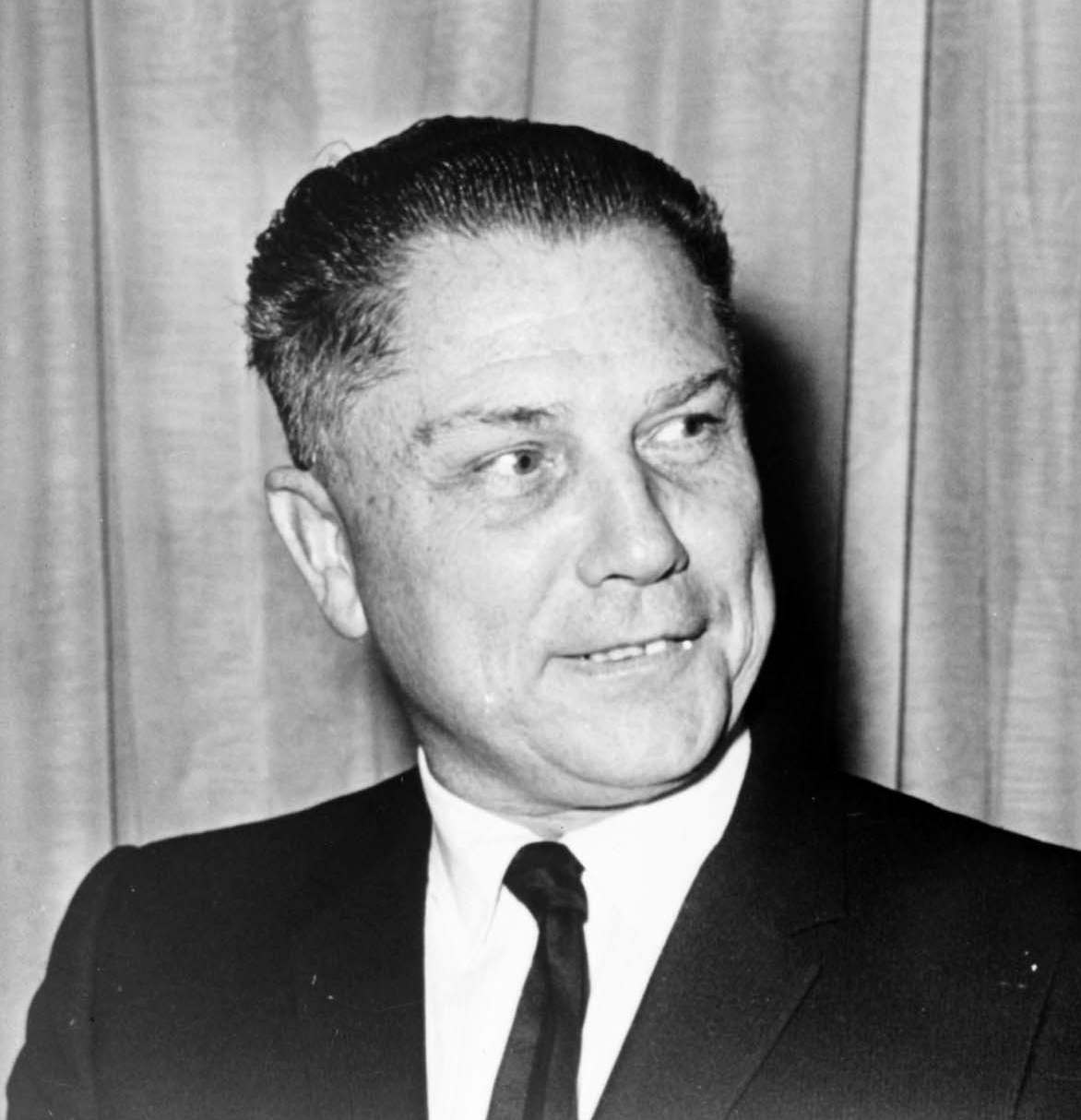
Jimmy Hoffa

- May 4 - As Jimmy Hoffa led the Teamsters in a strike against Detroit meat dealers and grocers, the Detroit Free Press reported that he had emerged as one of the most powerful and autocratic men in Detroit.
- May 19 - The Detroit Tigers split a double-header with the Boston Sox before a record crowd of 58,480 at Briggs Stadium.

=== June ===
- May 31 to June 3 - The Automobile Golden Jubilee was celebrated in Detroit. Festivities included painting Woodward Avenue gold with 1,000 gallons of paint, the smashing of a boron atom by the Jubilee Queen, a dramatic musical portrayal of Detroit's history, and an antique automotive exposition. During the atom-smashing ceremony, the grandstand at Grand Circus Park collapsed with several hundred people on it. As part of the jubilee, 14 industry pioneers were inducted into the newly established automotive hall of fame; the inductees included Frank Duryea, Henry Ford, Charles Nash, Ransom Olds, and Barney Oldfield. William Durant and Alfred P. Sloan were unable to attend. The Golden Jubilee Parade on June 1 along Woodward Avenue featured floats as well as old and new cars and attracted 750,000 spectators, the largest crowd ever gathered in Detroit.
- June 3 - General Motors announced a shakeup in his leadership with Alfred P. Sloan being replaced as CEO by C.E. Wilson. As part of the reorganization, Detroit was made the corporation's administrative headquarters.
- June 17 - A tornado struck late in the afternoon in Detroit's downriver River Rouge area and continued across the Detroit River into Canada, killing 20 persons and injuring hundreds. The tornado cut a 400- to 500-yard swath and "leveled blocks of residential and business buildings." Most of the fatalities occurred in Canada.
- June 18

Kim Sigler won the Republican gubernatorial primary by a 50,000-vote margin over Vernon J. Brown (lieutenant governor), Raymond J. Kelly (former commander of the American Legion), and Edward Jeffries (Detroit mayor). Sigler ran on his reputation as a crusader against government graft and a promise to clean house in Lansing.
Murray Van Wagoner, who previously served as governor (1941-1943), easily won the Democratic gubernatorial primary by a three-to-one margin over William J. Cody (Wayne County circuit court commissioner).

- June 27 - A tornado strikes near downtown Detroit at 3:37 p.m., injuring at least 20 people and causing extensive property damage.

=== July ===
- July 21 - A Lansing grand jury indicted 24 bankers, lawyers, and lawmakers on charges that the bankers sought to bribe legislators to block an anti-chain bank law. The persons charged included Howard J. Stoddard, president of Michigan National Bank. In September 1946, the grand jury's star witness, Charles F. Hemans, refused to return to the state to testify. A federal indictment was then sought to bring Hemans back to Michigan. Hemans was brought back to Michigan at the beginning of October. In December, Hemans was sentenced to four years in prison for violation of a law prohibiting witnesses to flee a state to avoid giving testimony in a felony.
- July 22 - A horse, Valdina Senora, ran into spectators standing along the fence in "the worst horse racing mishap in Michigan history." Seven persons were hurt, including a 58-year-old woman who sustained a skull fracture.
- July 27 - A report by the City Plan Commission reported that Detroit's population was 1,815,000, making it the country's fourth largest city despite a decline of 35,000 from the wartime peak in 1945.

=== August ===
- August 15 - The National Maritime Union (NMU) went on strike against the Great Lakes shipping fleet, paralyzing the region's shipping. The strike was marked by violence between NM picketers and representatives of shipping companies.
- August 17 - Jimmy Hoffa and 17 other Teamsters officials were indicted by Circuit Judge George B. Murphy's One-Man Grand Jury in Detroit investigating labor racketeering.
- August 20 - Fielding H. Yost, former University of Michigan football coach died.

=== September ===
- September 7 Jimmy Hoffa was indicted for the second time by the Murphy One-Man Grand Jury in less than a month (see August 17). He was charged along with Orrin A. DeMass (former Liquor Control Commission chairman) and James J. Stewart (chief investigator in the Wayne County prosecutor's office) for asking for $3,000 to halt a liquor commission action against bar owner, Turk Prujansky. Witnesses were placed under police protection on September 25 after Hoffa reportedly told one, "your dumb ... Do you want to get killed?"
- September 18 - More than 50,000 auto workers, including 33,750 at Chrysler, were idled due to a strike at Briggs and resulting part shortages. The Briggs strike was settled on September 21. In October, Prujansky refused to testify before the grand jury and was jailed for contempt.

=== October ===
- October 12 - No. 4 Michigan lost a close football game to No. 2 Army.

=== November ===
- November 5

In the 1946 Michigan gubernatorial election, Republican Kim Sigler was elected with 60.28% of the vote, defeating Democrat Murray Van Wagoner.
In the 1946 United States Senate election in Michigan, Republican Arthur Vandenberg was reelected with 67.06% of the vote, defeating Democrat James H. Lee.
In the 1946 United States House of Representatives elections in Michigan, Republicans won 14 of 17 races, flipping three seats previously held by Democrats.

- November 13 - The explosion of a hot-water tank at 11:37 a.m. at the public school in Baroda, Michigan, killed one student, Walter Ruppel (age 14), and injured 18 others. Approximately 250 children were in the school at the time. The Baroda fire chief blamed a faulty safety valve for the explosion.
- November 14 - Ford Motor Co. reported a loss of $51.6 million for the first nine months of the year, prior to adjustments due to tax carrybacks.
- November 23 - Michigan defeated Ohio State, 58–6, in their annual rivalry game.

=== December ===
- December 6 - Charlie Bachman resigned as Michigan State's football coach.
- December 30 - Arthur Vandenberg of Michigan was selected as the presiding officer of the U.S. Senate for the 80th Congress.

== Births ==
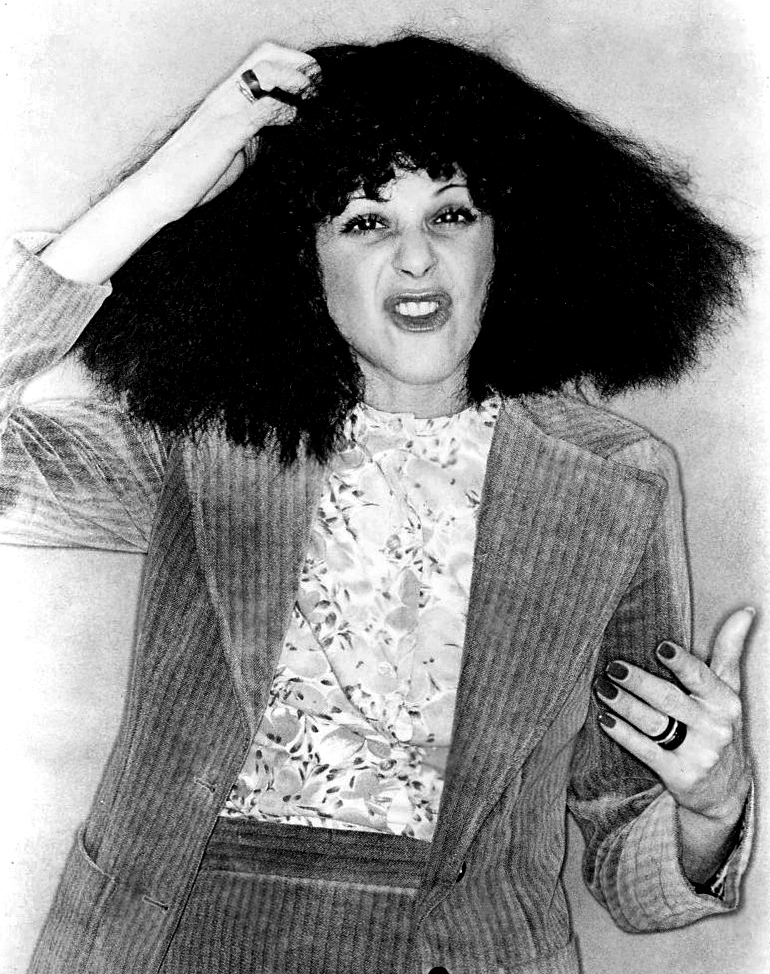
Gilda Radner

- January 26 - Deon Jackson, soul singer and songwriter, in Ann Arbor
- January 29 - Bettye LaVette, soul singer-songwriter, in Muskegon
- February 12 - Peter Schoomaker, 35th Chief of Staff of the U.S. Army, in Detroit
- February 17 - Lynne Moody, actress (That's My Mama, Roots), in Detroit
- February 25 - Gary Grimshaw, graphic artist, in Detroit
- March 5 - Dave Porter, NCAA wrestling champion and football player, in Lansing
- April 12 - Lewis N. Dodak, 63rd Speaker of the Michigan House of Representatives (1989–1992), in Saginaw County
- June 28 - Gilda Radner, actress and comedian, in Detroit
- July 22 - Paul Schrader, screenwriter (Taxi Driver, Raging Bull) and film director (American Gigolo), in Grand Rapids, Michigan
- September 7 - Pete Camarata, labor activist and Teamsters leader, in Detroit
- October 17 - Herb Orvis, defensive tackle in the NFL (1972–1981), in Petoskey, Michigan
- November 2 - Tom Paciorek, MLB player (1970–1987), in Detroit
- December 14 - Joyce Vincent Wilson, singer in Tony Orlando and Dawn, in Detroit
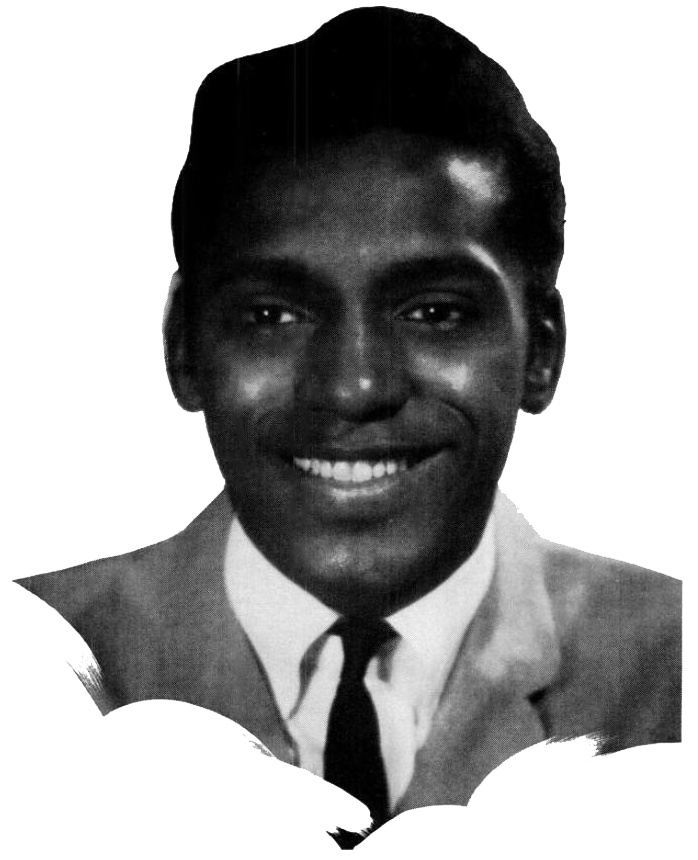
Deon Jackson

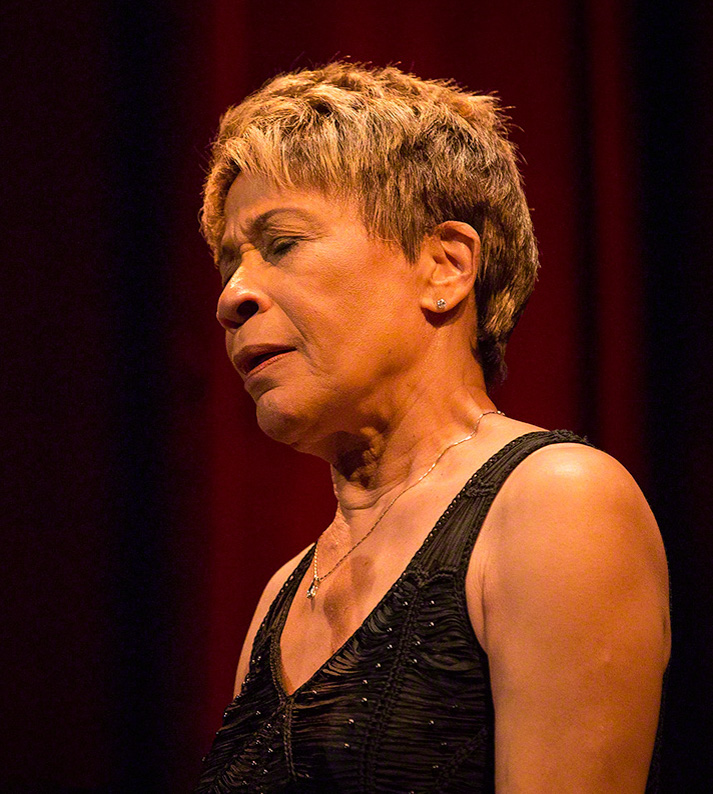
Bettye LaVette

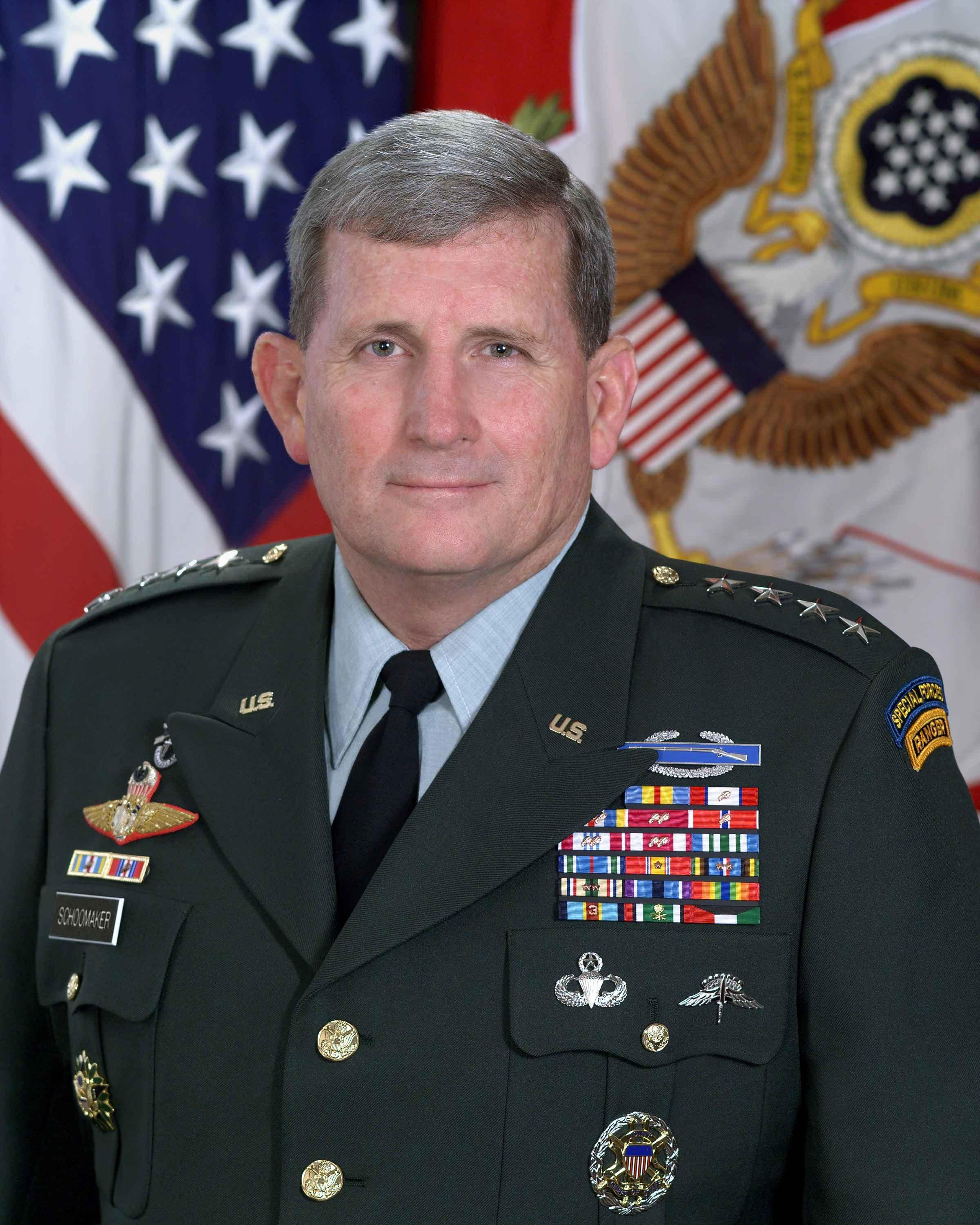
Peter Schoomaker

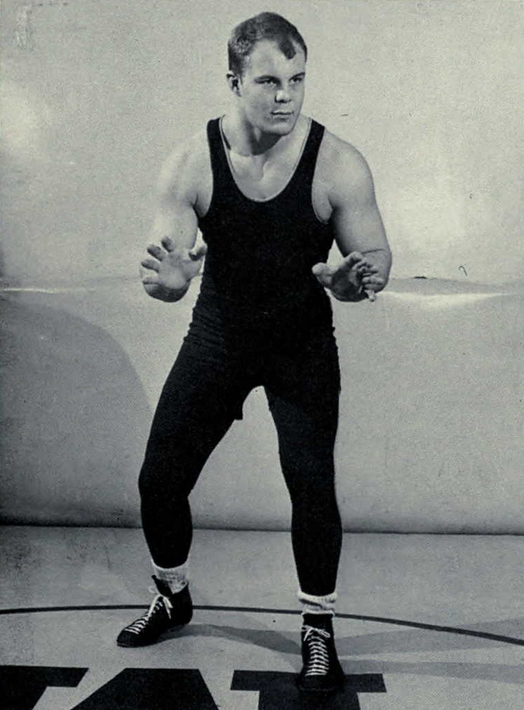
Dave Porter

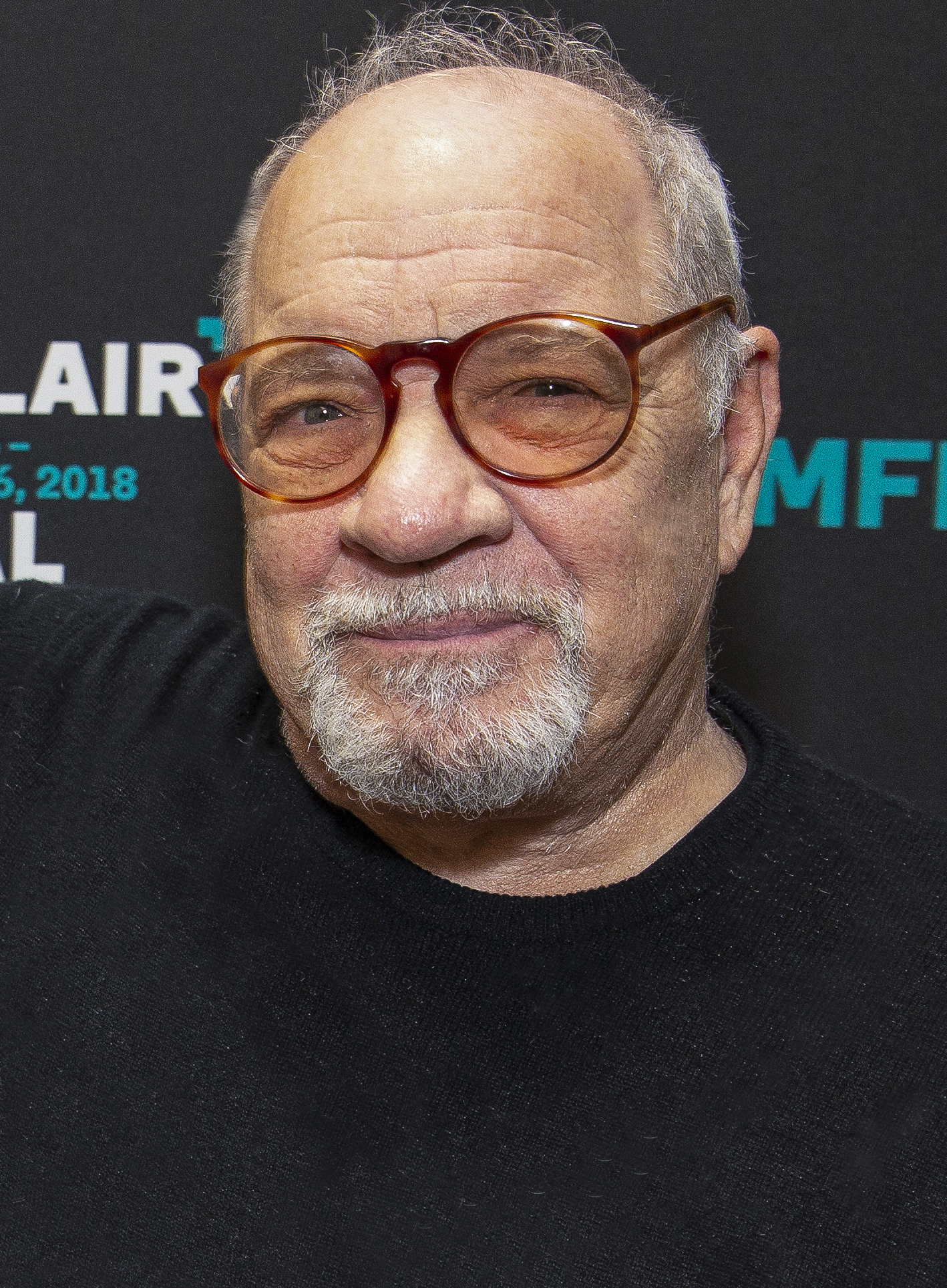
Paul Schrader

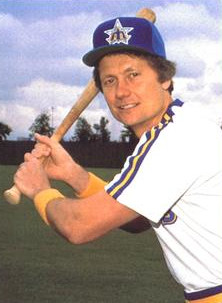
Tom Paciorek

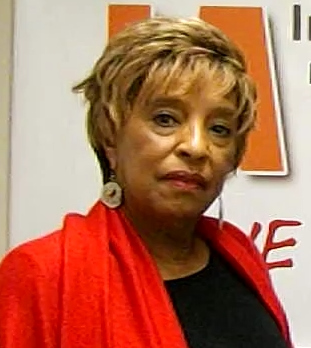
Joyce Vincent Wilson

== Deaths ==
- April 8 - Dr. Frank Cody, Detroit councilman and former president of Wayne University, in Detroit
- July 3 - Samuel Odell, Michigan State Treasurer (1917–1919), at age 64 in Shelby Township, Michigan
- August 26 - Fielding H. Yost, University of Michigan football coach (1901–1926), at age 75 in Ann Arbor
- October 4 - Barney Oldfield, automobile racer, at age 68 in Beverly Hills, California
- August 8 - Alva M. Cummins, lawyer and politician, 1922 Michigan Democratic gubernatorial nominee, at age 77 in Okemos
- September 13 - Paul Wurtsmith, "Detroit's top-ranked air ace", at age 40 in a plane crash in North Carolina
- November 28 - Mariah Herndon, freed slave, at age 107 in Detroit
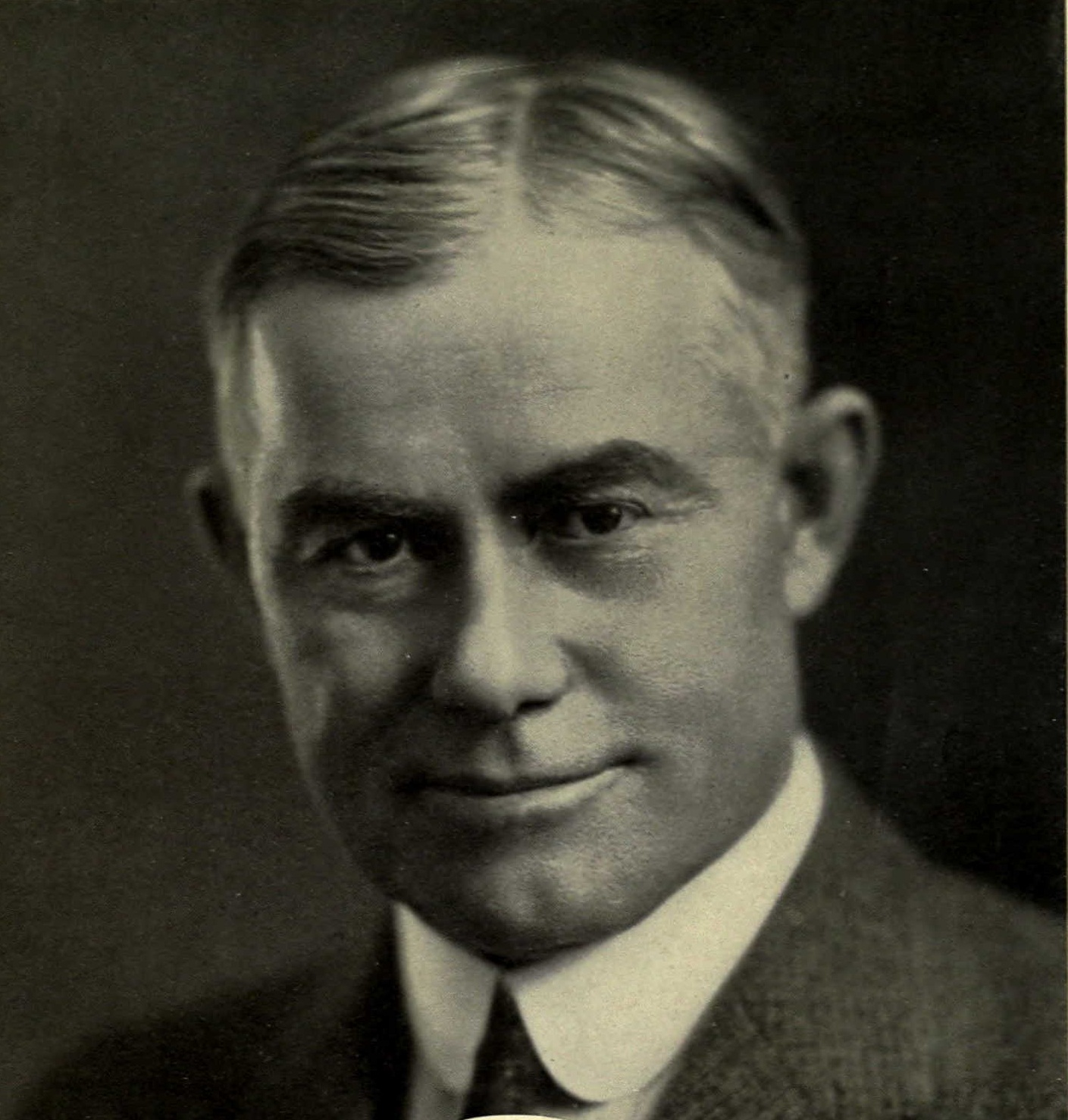
Fielding H. Yost

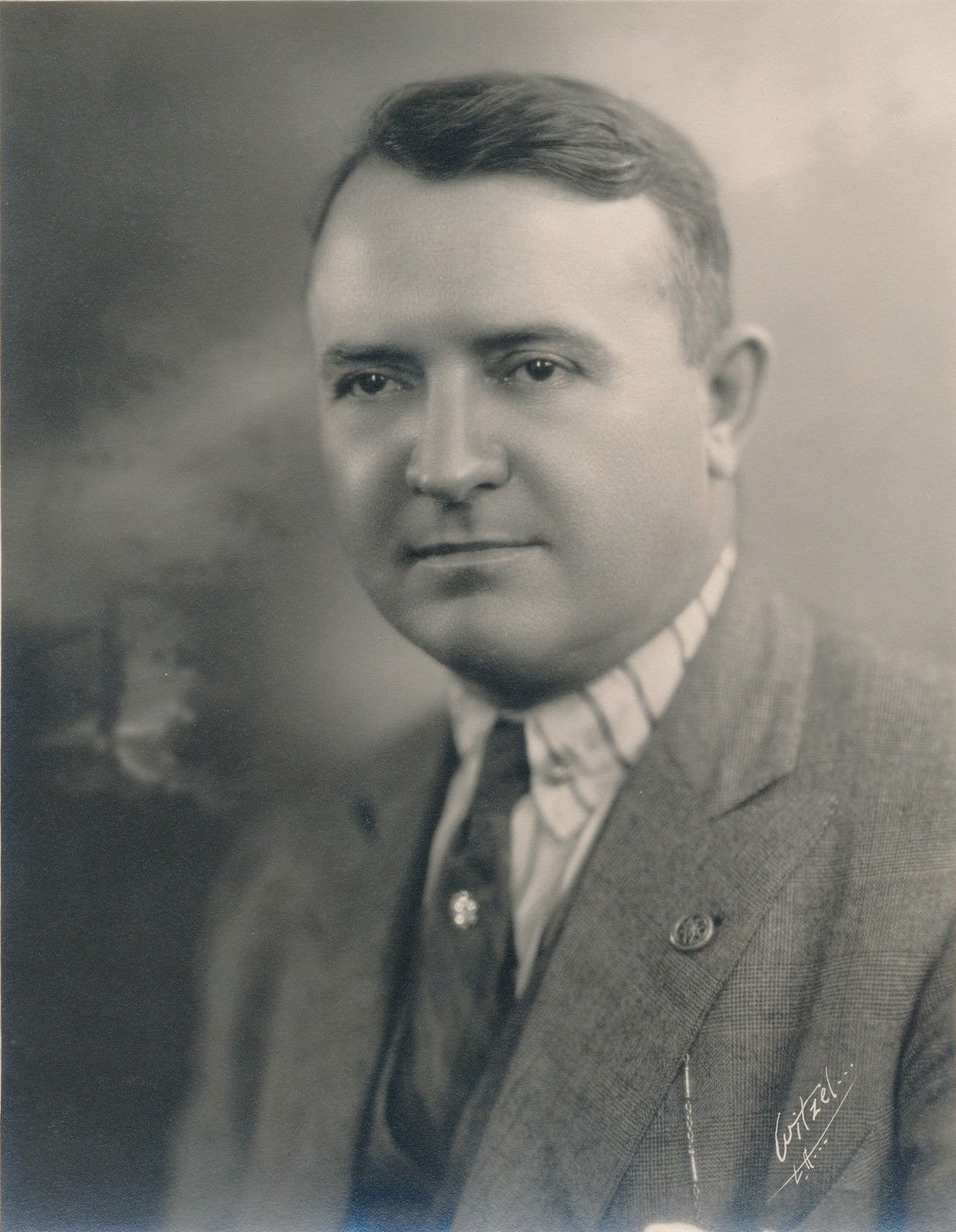
Barney Oldfield

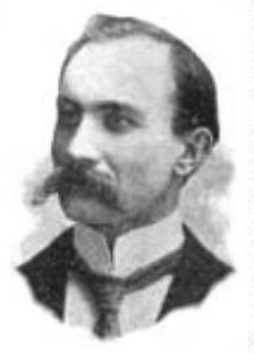
Alva M. Cummins

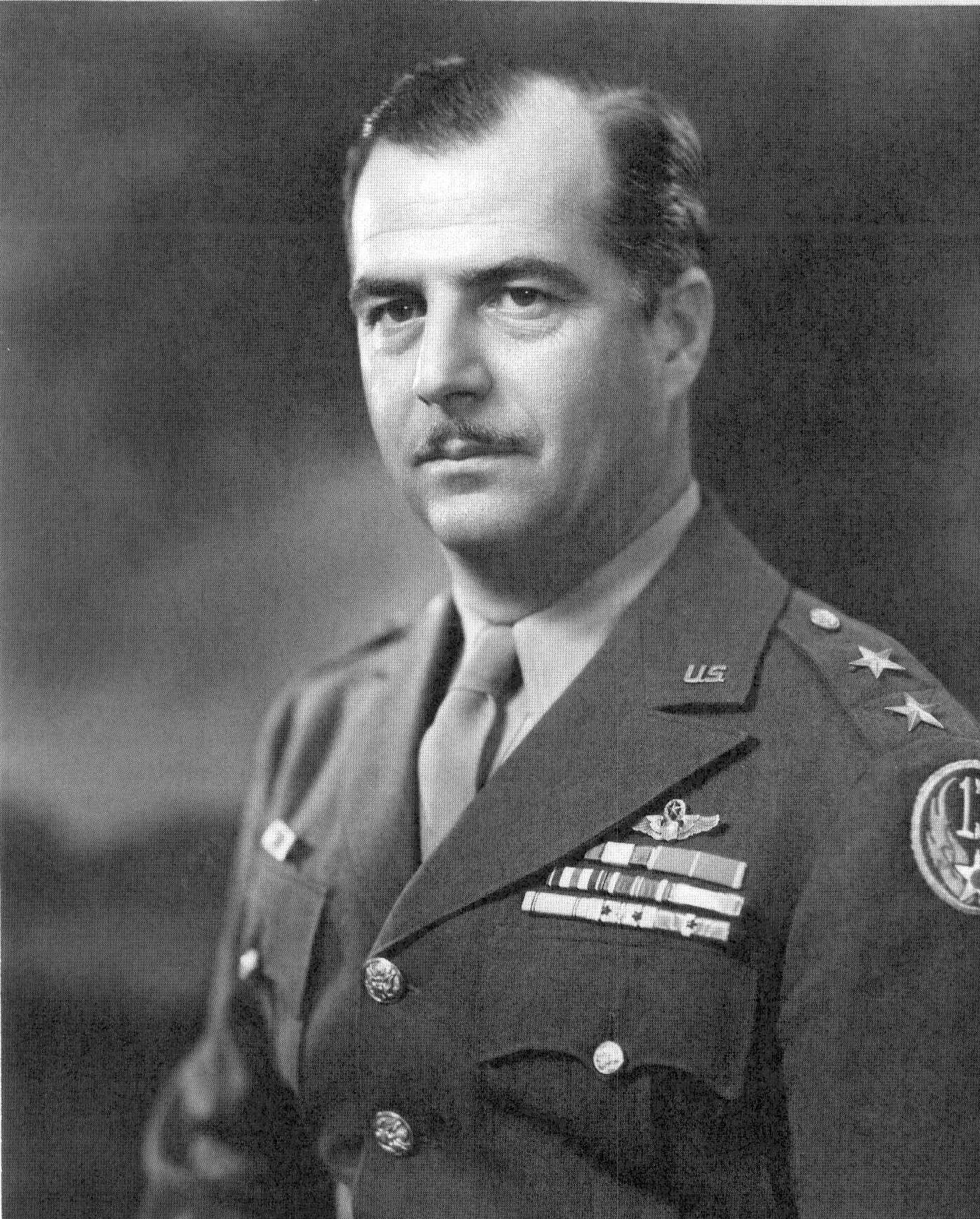
Paul Wurtsmith

== See also ==
- History of Michigan
- History of Detroit
