= Thaddeus M. Machrowicz =

American judge and politician

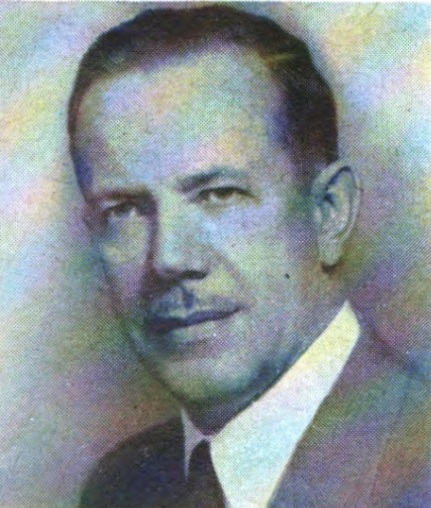
- From 1955's Pocket Congressional Directory of the Eighty-Fourth Congress

Judge of the United States District Court for the Eastern District of Michigan
- In office September 7, 1961 – February 17, 1970
- Appointed by: John F. Kennedy
- Preceded by: Frank Albert Picard
- Succeeded by: Cornelia Groefsema Kennedy

Member of the U.S. House of Representatives from Michigan's 1st district
- In office January 3, 1951 – September 18, 1961
- Preceded by: George G. Sadowski
- Succeeded by: Lucien Nedzi

Personal details
- Born: Thaddeus Michael Machrowicz; August 21, 1899 Gostyń, Posen, Prussia (now Poland)
- Died: February 17, 1970 (aged 70) Bloomfield Township, Michigan, U.S.
- Resting place: Mount Olivet Cemetery; Detroit, Michigan, U.S.
- Party: Democratic
- Education: Detroit College of Law (LL.B.)

Thaddeus Michael Machrowicz (August 21, 1899 – February 17, 1970) was a United States representative from Michigan and later was a United States district judge of the United States District Court for the Eastern District of Michigan.

== Education and career ==
Born in Gostyń in Prussia's Province of Posen (in modern-day Poland), Machrowicz immigrated to the United States with his parents in 1902 and the family settled in Chicago, Illinois, later moving to Milwaukee, Wisconsin. He was naturalized as a Citizen of the United States in 1910. He attended a parochial school in Milwaukee. He then attended Alliance College in Cambridge Springs, Pennsylvania from 1912 to 1916, and the University of Chicago in 1917. During the First World War, he served as a lieutenant in the Polish Army of American Volunteers in Canada, France and Poland from 1917 to 1920. He served with the American Advisory Commission to Polish Government in 1920 and 1921 and also acted as war correspondent with Floyd Gibbons in Poland from 1919 to 1921. He attended DePaul University in 1921. He received a Bachelor of Laws from Detroit College of Law (now Michigan State University College of Law) in 1924 and was admitted to the Michigan Bar the same year. He was in private practice of law in Detroit, Michigan, from 1924 to 1934. He was city attorney of Hamtramck, Michigan, from 1934 to 1936. He was legal director of the Michigan Public Utilities Commission from 1938 to 1939. He returned to private practice in Hamtramck from 1939 to 1942. He was a municipal judge for Hamtramck from 1942 to 1950. He was a delegate to the Democratic National Convention from Michigan in 1952 and 1956.

== Congressional service ==
Machrowicz was elected as a Democrat to the 82nd Congress and to the five succeeding Congresses and served from January 3, 1951, to September 18, 1961, when he resigned to accept appointment to the federal bench.

== Federal judicial service ==
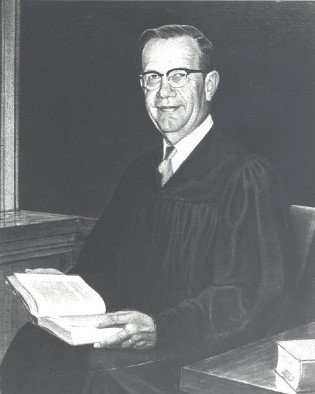
Judicial portrait of Machrowicz, c. 1970.

Machrowicz was nominated by President John F. Kennedy on August 25, 1961, to a seat on the United States District Court for the Eastern District of Michigan vacated by Judge Frank Albert Picard. He was confirmed by the United States Senate on September 1, 1961, and received his commission on September 7, 1961. His service was terminated on February 17, 1970, due to his death in Bloomfield Township, Oakland County, Michigan. He was interred in Mount Olivet Cemetery in Detroit, Michigan.

== Sources ==
- United States Congress. "Thaddeus M. Machrowicz (id: M000014)". Biographical Directory of the United States Congress.
- Thaddeus M. Machrowicz at The Political Graveyard
- Thaddeus M. Machrowicz at the Federal Judicial Center

U.S. House of Representatives
| Preceded by George G. Sadowski | United States Representative for the 1st congressional district of Michigan; 1951–1961 | Succeeded by Lucien Nedzi |
Legal offices
| Preceded by Frank Albert Picard | Judge of the United States District Court for the Eastern District of Michigan; 1961–1970 | Succeeded by Cornelia Groefsema Kennedy |
