= Lucien Nedzi =

American politician (1925–2025)

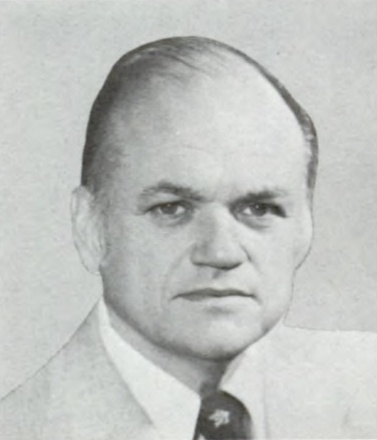
- Nedzi from the Congressional pictorial directory, 1979

Member of the U.S. House of Representatives from Michigan
- In office November 7, 1961 – January 3, 1981
- Preceded by: Thaddeus M. Machrowicz
- Succeeded by: Dennis Hertel
- Constituency: 1st district (1961–1965); 14th district (1965–1981)

Public Administrator of Wayne County, Michigan
- In office January 1, 1955 – November 7, 1961

Personal details
- Born: Lucien Norbert Nedzi; May 28, 1925 Hamtramck, Michigan, U.S.
- Died: June 9, 2025 (aged 100) Reston, Virginia, U.S.
- Resting place: Arlington National Cemetery
- Party: Democratic
- Spouse: Margaret Kathleen Garvey (m. 1952; died 2020)
- Children: 5
- Education: University of Michigan (AB); University of Michigan (JD)

Military service
- Allegiance: United States
- Branch: United States Army; Army Reserve
- Service years: 1944–1946 (active); 1946–1953 (reserve)
- Conflicts: World War II; Korean War

Lucien Norbert Nedzi (May 28, 1925 – June 9, 2025) was an American attorney and politician from Michigan who served as public administrator of Wayne County, Michigan from 1955 to 1961 and a member of the United States House of Representatives from 1961 to 1981. He was a member of the Democratic Party. After serving in the United States Army, he was elected as a U.S. representative representing Michigan's 1st congressional district from 1961 to 1965 and Michigan's 14th congressional district from 1965 to 1981. He chaired the House Select Committee on Intelligence, initially known as the Nedzi Committee after him, in 1975. Nedzi also served as chair of the United States Congressional Joint Committee on the Library and the United States House Committee on House Administration.

== Early life and education ==
Nedzi was born to Polish immigrants Aleksander Nedzi and Stephania (Wojszko) Nedzi in the town of Hamtramck, Michigan, an exclave of Detroit. He graduated from Hamtramck High School, and enrolled in the University of Michigan, graduating in 1943 with a Bachelor of Arts degree. In 1951, he earned a Juris Doctor from the University of Michigan Law School. He was admitted to the Michigan bar in January 1952. He later graduated from the National War College and Naval War College.

== Military service ==
From 1944 to 1946, he served in the United States Army during World War II as an infantryman in the Philippines, and in the United States Army Corps of Engineers in Occupied Japan. From 1946 to 1953, he was in the active United States Army Reserve, during which time he served in the Korean War.

== Politics ==
Nedzi served as the public administrator of Wayne County, Michigan, from 1955 to 1961.

=== Congress ===
Nedzi was elected as a U.S. representative from Michigan's 1st congressional district to the 87th United States Congress in a special election in 1961 to fill the vacancy left by resigning U.S. representative Thaddeus M. Machrowicz. He was re-elected in the 1962 election and two years later he was elected from Michigan's 14th congressional district and every two years after that until he declined to seek re-election in the 1980 election. In all, he served from November 7, 1961, to January 3, 1981. Nedzi voted in favor of the Civil Rights Act of 1964.

Nedzi chaired the House Select Committee on Intelligence, known as the Nedzi Committee, from February 1975 until he controversially resigned in June. Its purpose was to increase congressional oversight of the Central Intelligence Agency after a series of scandals. The committee's work was continued by the Pike Committee. His resignation came after The New York Times reported that Nedzi was aware of the Central Intelligence Agency being possibly involved in "assassination plans and domestic law violations", but did not notify the United States House of Representatives or open an investigation into the matter.

In addition, Nedzi chaired the United States Congressional Joint Committee on the Library from 1973 to 1979 and the United States House Committee on House Administration from 1979 to 1981.

== Personal life and death ==
Nedzi married the former Margaret Kathleen "Peggy" Garvey on January 28, 1952 in Laredo, Texas, after they met on a blind date during her dietetic internship at Henry Ford Hospital in Detroit. Together, they had five children and nine grandchildren. For the rest of their marriage, they lived in McLean, Virginia. Peggy Nedzi died on November 1, 2020 at age 95 while recovering from rheumatoid vasculitis.

Nedzi died in Reston, Virginia on June 9, 2025, one week and five days after his 100th birthday. He was interred at Arlington National Cemetery.

U.S. House of Representatives
Preceded by Thaddeus M. Machrowicz	Member of the U.S. House of Representatives from Michigan's 1st congressional district November 7, 1961 – January 3, 1965	Succeeded by John Conyers
Preceded by Harold M. Ryan	Member of the U.S. House of Representatives from Michigan's 14th congressional district January 3, 1965 – January 3, 1981	Succeeded by Dennis Hertel
