= 1922 Michigan gubernatorial election =

- November 7, 1922
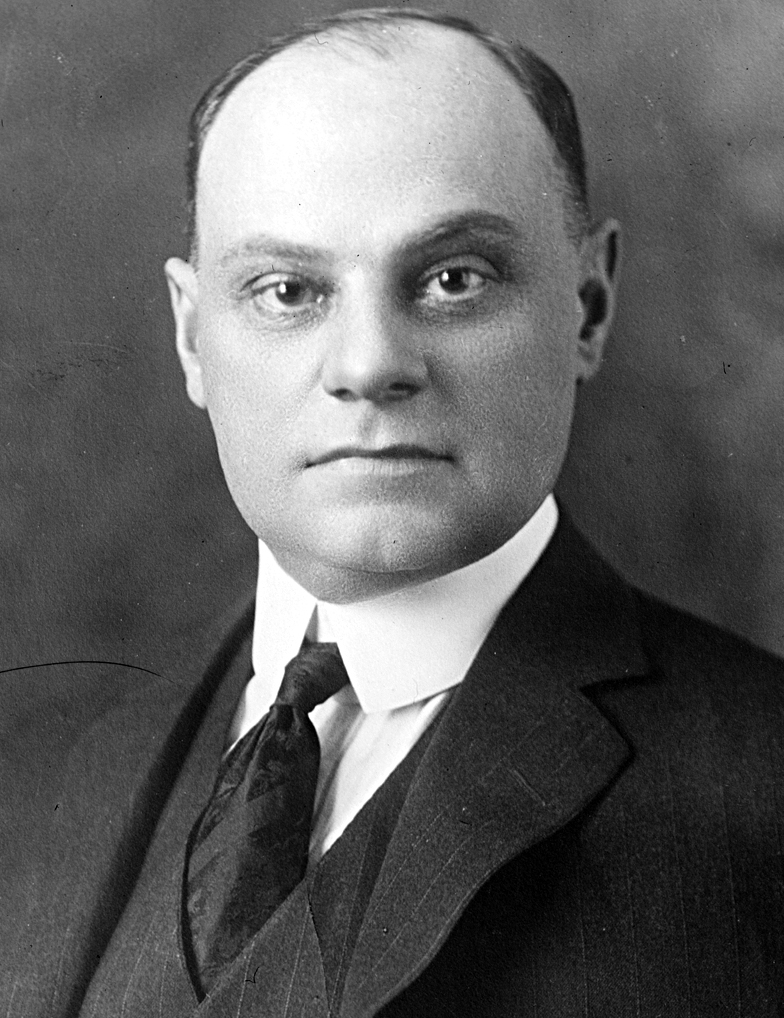

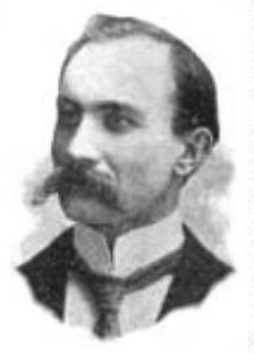
Nominee	Alex J. Groesbeck	Alva M. Cummins
Party	Republican	Democratic
Popular vote	356,933	218,252
Percentage	61.15%	37.39%
- County results Groesbeck: 50–60% 60–70% 70–80% 80–90% Cummins: 40–50% 50–60% 60–70% 70–80%
Governor before election
Alex J. Groesbeck
Republican
Elected Governor
Alex J. Groesbeck
Republican

The 1922 Michigan gubernatorial election was held on November 7, 1922. Incumbent Republican Alex J. Groesbeck defeated Democratic nominee Alva M. Cummins with 61.15% of the vote.

== Primary election ==
Michigan held primary elections on September 12, 1922.

=== Republican party ===
Incumbent governor Alex J. Groesbeck was renominated without major opposition.

==== Candidates ====
- Richard H. Fletcher, State Labor Commissioner
- Alex J. Groesbeck, incumbent governor
- Theodore M. Joslin, former mayor of Adrian

==== Results ====
Republican primary results
Party	Candidate	Votes	%
Republican	Alex J. Groesbeck (inc.)	248,502	62.12%
Republican	Richard H. Fletcher	110,000	27.50%
Republican	Theodore M. Joslin	41,532	10.38%
Total votes		400,034	100.00%

=== Democratic party ===
Alva M. Cummins defeated James B. Balch in a relatively close race.

==== Candidates ====
- James B. Balch, former mayor of Kalamazoo
- Alva M. Cummins, lawyer from Lansing

==== Results ====
Democratic primary results
Party	Candidate	Votes	%
Democratic	Alva M. Cummins	12,134	52.91%
Democratic	James B. Balch	10,799	47.09%
Total votes		22,933	100.00%

=== Minor parties ===
Socialist primary results
Party	Candidate	Votes	%
Socialist	Benjamin Blumenberg	622	100.00%
Total votes		622	100.00%

Prohibition primary results
Party	Candidate	Votes	%
Prohibition	Belden Crane Hoyt	244	100.00%
Total votes		244	100.00%

Socialist Labor primary results
Party	Candidate	Votes	%
Socialist Labor	Edward R. Markley	143	100.00%
Total votes		143	100.00%

== General election ==
=== Candidates ===
Major party candidates

- Alex J. Groesbeck, Republican
- Alva M. Cummins, Democratic

Other candidates

- Benjamin Blumenberg, Socialist
- Belden Crane Hoyt, Prohibition
- Edward R. Markley, Socialist Labor

=== Results ===
1922 Michigan gubernatorial election
Party	Candidate	Votes	%	±%
Republican	Alex J. Groesbeck (inc.)	356,933	61.15%	−5.28%
Democratic	Alva M. Cummins	218,252	37.39%	+8.05%
Socialist	Benjamin Blumenberg	4,452	0.76%	−1.48%
Prohibition	Belden Crane Hoyt	2,744	0.47%	−0.19%
Socialist Labor	Edward R. Markley	1,279	0.22%	+0.02%
	Scattering	1	0.00%	
Majority		138,681	23.76%	
Total votes		583,661	100.00%	
Republican hold		Swing	-13.33%	

==== Results by county ====
County	Alex J. Groesbeck Republican		Alva M. Cummins Democratic		Benjamin Blumenberg Socialist		Belden Crane Hoyt Prohibition		Edward R. Markley Socialist Labor		Margin		Total votes cast
County	#	%	#	%	#	%	#	%	#	%	#	%	Total votes cast
Alcona	432	64.96%	217	32.63%	1	0.15%	12	1.80%	3	0.45%	215	32.33%	665
Alger	666	62.65%	350	32.93%	31	2.92%	5	0.47%	11	1.03%	316	29.73%	1,063
Allegan	4,190	70.69%	1,671	28.19%	19	0.32%	38	0.64%	9	0.15%	2,519	42.50%	5,927
Alpena	1,503	55.34%	1,188	43.74%	16	0.59%	4	0.15%	5	0.18%	315	11.60%	2,716
Antrim	1,132	76.28%	306	20.62%	17	1.15%	23	1.55%	6	0.40%	826	55.66%	1,484
Arenac	1,171	58.32%	794	39.54%	26	1.29%	14	0.70%	3	0.15%	377	18.77%	2,008
Baraga	1,461	79.02%	370	20.01%	8	0.43%	5	0.27%	5	0.27%	1,091	59.00%	1,849
Barry	3,711	61.71%	2,259	37.56%	9	0.15%	28	0.47%	7	0.12%	1,452	24.14%	6,014
Bay	6,177	59.78%	4,063	39.32%	50	0.48%	22	0.21%	21	0.20%	2,114	20.46%	10,333
Benzie	1,237	78.54%	284	18.03%	28	1.78%	25	1.59%	1	0.06%	953	60.51%	1,575
Berrien	6,323	56.69%	4,695	42.09%	70	0.63%	44	0.39%	22	0.20%	1,628	14.60%	11,154
Branch	2,680	44.39%	3,280	54.32%	13	0.22%	61	1.01%	4	0.07%	-600	-9.94%	6,038
Calhoun	6,603	53.95%	5,520	45.10%	67	0.55%	37	0.30%	12	0.10%	1,083	8.85%	12,239
Cass	2,882	51.24%	2,693	47.88%	25	0.44%	21	0.37%	3	0.05%	189	3.36%	5,624
Charlevoix	1,551	67.20%	698	30.24%	34	1.47%	18	0.78%	7	0.30%	853	36.96%	2,308
Cheboygan	1,753	63.38%	979	35.39%	8	0.29%	20	0.72%	6	0.22%	774	27.98%	2,766
Chippewa	2,827	72.86%	996	25.67%	22	0.57%	24	0.62%	11	0.28%	1,831	47.19%	3,880
Clare	1,062	55.75%	822	43.15%	10	0.52%	8	0.42%	3	0.16%	240	12.60%	1,905
Clinton	1,497	27.93%	3,830	71.47%	9	0.17%	23	0.43%	0	0.00%	-2,333	-43.53%	5,359
Crawford	488	53.28%	416	45.41%	4	0.44%	6	0.66%	2	0.22%	72	7.86%	916
Delta	2,816	70.15%	1,112	27.70%	47	1.17%	13	0.32%	26	0.65%	1,704	42.45%	4,014
Dickinson	4,307	87.75%	493	10.04%	67	1.37%	27	0.55%	14	0.29%	3,814	77.71%	4,908
Eaton	2,545	37.48%	4,183	61.61%	22	0.32%	37	0.54%	3	0.04%	-1,638	-24.12%	6,790
Emmet	1,366	62.32%	755	34.44%	39	1.78%	27	1.23%	5	0.23%	611	27.87%	2,192
Genesee	9,845	56.35%	7,435	42.56%	82	0.47%	80	0.46%	29	0.17%	2,410	13.79%	17,471
Gladwin	847	74.96%	256	22.65%	9	0.80%	14	1.24%	4	0.35%	591	52.30%	1,130
Gogebic	3,698	74.69%	1,131	22.84%	67	1.35%	34	0.69%	21	0.42%	2,567	51.85%	4,951
Grand Traverse	1,800	73.47%	577	23.55%	46	1.88%	20	0.82%	7	0.29%	1,223	49.92%	2,450
Gratiot	2,870	46.65%	3,220	52.34%	20	0.33%	36	0.59%	6	0.10%	-350	-5.69%	6,152
Hillsdale	2,679	47.89%	2,875	51.39%	14	0.25%	26	0.46%	0	0.00%	-196	-3.50%	5,594
Houghton	6,287	77.10%	1,735	21.28%	55	0.67%	62	0.76%	15	0.18%	4,552	55.83%	8,154
Huron	5,756	71.48%	2,254	27.99%	25	0.31%	17	0.21%	1	0.01%	3,502	43.49%	8,053
Ingham	4,987	27.02%	13,179	71.41%	190	1.03%	80	0.43%	19	0.10%	-8,192	-44.39%	18,456 (Note: Includes 1 Scattering vote)
Ionia	2,723	30.91%	5,987	67.96%	35	0.40%	61	0.69%	4	0.05%	-3,264	-37.05%	8,810
Iosco	982	63.44%	544	35.14%	4	0.26%	12	0.78%	6	0.39%	438	28.29%	1,548
Iron	2,460	77.41%	625	19.67%	47	1.48%	13	0.41%	33	1.04%	1,835	57.74%	3,178
Isabella	1,985	48.65%	2,026	49.66%	22	0.54%	41	1.00%	6	0.15%	-41	-1.00%	4,080
Jackson	7,463	48.10%	7,936	51.15%	39	0.25%	55	0.35%	21	0.14%	-473	-3.05%	15,514
Kalamazoo	5,859	60.04%	3,640	37.30%	143	1.47%	102	1.05%	15	0.15%	2,219	22.74%	9,759
Kalkaska	760	74.44%	235	23.02%	15	1.47%	10	0.98%	1	0.10%	525	51.42%	1,021
Kent	20,001	68.38%	8,984	30.71%	135	0.46%	92	0.31%	38	0.13%	11,017	37.66%	29,250
Keweenaw	1,097	89.77%	95	7.77%	6	0.49%	16	1.31%	8	0.65%	1,002	82.00%	1,222
Lake	656	70.16%	260	27.81%	7	0.75%	6	0.64%	6	0.64%	396	42.35%	935
Lapeer	4,328	71.08%	1,725	28.33%	9	0.15%	23	0.38%	4	0.07%	2,603	42.75%	6,089
Leelanau	960	80.00%	217	18.08%	13	1.08%	8	0.67%	2	0.17%	743	61.92%	1,200
Lenawee	5,436	45.60%	6,368	53.41%	57	0.48%	48	0.40%	13	0.11%	-932	-7.82%	11,922
Livingston	2,263	36.02%	3,965	63.11%	12	0.19%	42	0.67%	1	0.02%	-1,702	-27.09%	6,283
Luce	889	79.16%	216	19.23%	2	0.18%	12	1.07%	4	0.36%	673	59.93%	1,123
Mackinac	1,057	57.17%	779	42.13%	4	0.22%	9	0.49%	0	0.00%	278	15.04%	1,849
Macomb	7,740	64.97%	4,067	34.14%	50	0.42%	37	0.31%	19	0.16%	3,673	30.83%	11,913
Manistee	2,808 (Note: The 1923-1924 Michigan Manual contains a typo for Groesbeck in this county. The correct figure of 2,808 can be obtained by using the county total.)	63.14%	1,575	35.42%	43	0.97%	11	0.25%	10	0.22%	1,233	27.73%	4,447
Marquette	4,544	64.84%	2,290	32.68%	89	1.27%	55	0.78%	30	0.43%	2,254	32.16%	7,008
Mason	1,886	73.24%	605	23.50%	45	1.75%	29	1.13%	10	0.39%	1,281	49.75%	2,575
Mecosta	1,900	66.11%	946	32.92%	15	0.52%	11	0.38%	2	0.07%	954	33.19%	2,874
Menominee	3,051	55.26%	2,380	43.11%	45	0.82%	35	0.63%	10	0.18%	671	12.15%	5,521
Midland	2,004	58.04%	1,419	41.09%	14	0.41%	12	0.35%	4	0.12%	585	16.94%	3,453
Missaukee	787	82.32%	154	16.11%	5	0.52%	8	0.84%	2	0.21%	633	66.21%	956
Monroe	4,367	45.35%	5,198	53.98%	22	0.23%	30	0.31%	13	0.13%	-831	-8.63%	9,630
Montcalm	2,707	62.94%	1,554	36.13%	15	0.35%	23	0.53%	2	0.05%	1,153	26.81%	4,301
Montmorency	701	65.95%	347	32.64%	4	0.38%	10	0.94%	1	0.09%	354	33.30%	7,398
Muskegon	5,235	70.76%	1,977	26.72%	87	1.18%	66	0.89%	33	0.45%	3,258	44.04%	7,398
Newaygo	2,140	67.55%	979	30.90%	16	0.51%	26	0.82%	7	0.22%	1,161	36.65%	3,168
Oakland	9,255	59.16%	6,226	39.80%	73	0.47%	76	0.49%	14	0.09%	3,028	19.36%	15,644
Oceana	1,841	71.03%	686	26.47%	23	0.89%	30	1.16%	12	0.46%	1,155	44.56%	2,592
Ogemaw	933	62.16%	532	35.44%	16	1.07%	18	1.20%	2	0.13%	401	26.72%	1,501
Ontonagon	1,912	81.12%	371	15.74%	44	1.87%	4	0.17%	26	1.10%	1,541	65.38%	2,357
Osceola	1,708	72.40%	638	27.05%	2	0.08%	10	0.42%	1	0.04%	1,070	45.36%	2,359
Oscoda	246	53.36%	206	44.69%	2	0.43%	7	1.52%	0	0.00%	40	8.68%	461
Otsego	462	53.53%	395	45.77%	4	0.46%	1	0.12%	1	0.12%	67	7.76%	863
Ottawa	5,278	72.35%	1,947	26.69%	37	0.51%	31	0.42%	2	0.03%	3,331	45.66%	7,295
Presque Isle	2,043	76.69%	603	22.64%	8	0.30%	4	0.15%	6	0.23%	1,440	54.05%	2,664
Roscommon	450	67.98%	202	30.51%	4	0.60%	1	0.15%	5	0.76%	248	37.46%	662
Saginaw	12,754	57.06%	9,226	41.27%	258	1.15%	58	0.26%	57	0.25%	3,528	15.78%	22,353
Sanilac	3,871	68.72%	1,702	30.21%	15	0.27%	43	0.76%	2	0.04%	2,169	38.51%	5,633
Schoolcraft	2,068	79.81%	470	18.14%	34	1.31%	6	0.23%	13	0.50%	1,598	61.68%	2,591
Shiawassee	3,296	39.80%	4,909	59.27%	22	0.27%	52	0.63%	3	0.04%	-1,613	-19.48%	8,282
St. Clair	8,634	64.35%	4,668	34.79%	19	0.14%	78	0.58%	19	0.14%	3,966	29.56%	13,418
St. Joseph	3,148	52.17%	2,841	47.08%	27	0.45%	16	0.27%	2	0.03%	307	5.09%	6,034
Tuscola	3,160	63.47%	1,767	35.49%	12	0.24%	34	0.68%	6	0.12%	1,393	27.98%	4,979
Van Buren	3,785	65.64%	1,926	33.40%	30	0.52%	19	0.33%	6	0.10%	1,859	32.24%	5,766
Washtenaw	7,249	60.96%	4,557	38.32%	15	0.13%	56	0.47%	15	0.13%	2,692	22.64%	11,892
Wayne	85,224	71.24%	31,941	26.70%	1,628	1.36%	351	0.29%	481	0.40%	53,283	44.54%	119,625
Wexford	1,678	68.16%	710	28.84%	29	1.18%	35	1.42%	10	0.41%	968	39.32%	2,462
Total	356,933	61.15%	218,252	37.39%	4,452	0.76%	2,744	0.47%	1,279	0.22%	138,681	23.76%	583,661

===== Counties that flipped from Republican to Democratic =====
- Branch
- Clinton
- Eaton
- Gratiot
- Hillsdale
- Ingham
- Ionia
- Isabella
- Jackson
- Lenawee
- Livingston
- Monroe
- Shiawassee
