= Frank Albert Picard =

American judge

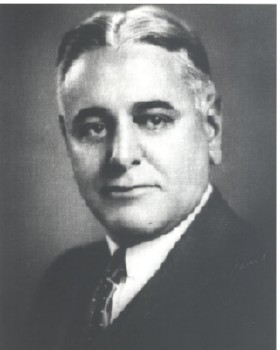

Senior Judge of the United States District Court for the Eastern District of Michigan
- In office March 31, 1959 – February 28, 1963

Chief Judge of the United States District Court for the Eastern District of Michigan
- In office 1959
- Preceded by: Arthur F. Lederle
- Succeeded by: Theodore Levin

Judge of the United States District Court for the Eastern District of Michigan
- In office February 23, 1939 – March 31, 1959
- Appointed by: Franklin D. Roosevelt
- Preceded by: Seat established by 52 Stat. 584
- Succeeded by: Thaddeus M. Machrowicz

Personal details
- Born: Frank Albert Picard; October 19, 1889 Saginaw, Michigan
- Died: February 28, 1963 (aged 73)
- Education: University of Michigan (LLB)

Frank Albert Picard (October 19, 1889 – February 28, 1963) was a United States district judge of the United States District Court for the Eastern District of Michigan.

== Education and career ==
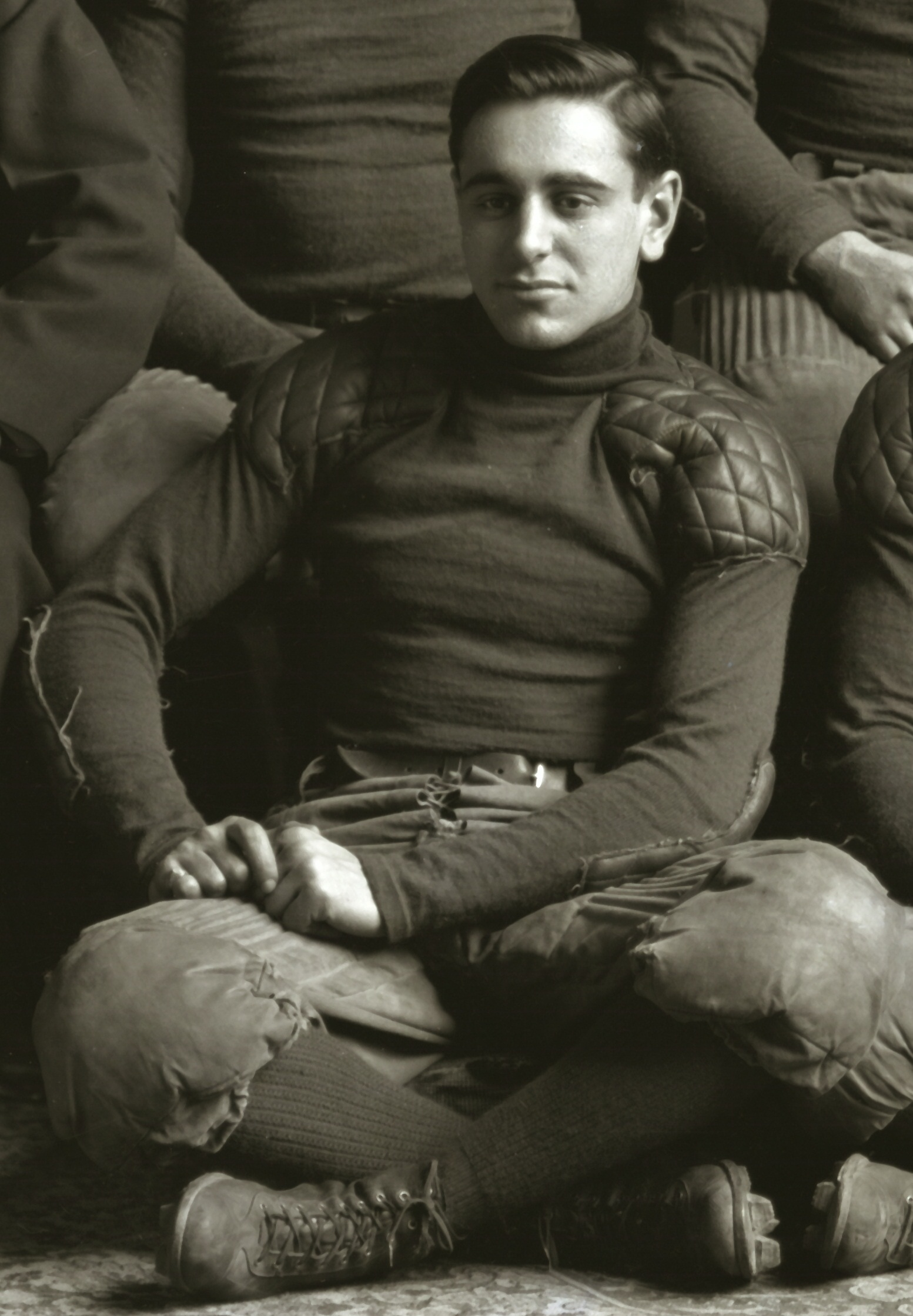
Picard in a 1911 Michigan team photograph.

Born in Saginaw, Michigan, Picard received a Bachelor of Laws from the University of Michigan Law School in 1912. He was an assistant prosecuting attorney of Saginaw County, Michigan in 1913. He was in private practice of law in Saginaw from 1913 to 1917. He was in the United States Army as a Captain from 1917 to 1919. He returned to private practice in Saginaw from 1919 to 1939. He was city attorney of Saginaw from 1924 to 1928. He was a candidate for the United States Senate from Michigan in 1934.

== Federal judicial service ==
Picard was nominated by President Franklin D. Roosevelt on February 9, 1939, to the United States District Court for the Eastern District of Michigan, to a new seat created by 52 Stat. 584. He was confirmed by the United States Senate on February 16, 1939, and received his commission on February 23, 1939. He served as Chief Judge in 1959. He assumed senior status on March 31, 1959. His service was terminated on February 28, 1963, due to his death.

== Sources ==
Party political offices
| Preceded by John W. Bailey | Democratic nominee for U.S. Senator from Michigan (Class 1); 1934 | Succeeded by Frank FitzGerald |
Legal offices
| Preceded by Seat established by 52 Stat. 584 | Judge of the United States District Court for the Eastern District of Michigan; 1939–1959 | Succeeded by Thaddeus M. Machrowicz |
| Preceded by Arthur F. Lederle | Chief Judge of the United States District Court for the Eastern District of Michigan; 1959 | Succeeded by Theodore Levin |
