= 1934 United States Senate election in Michigan =

- November 6, 1934
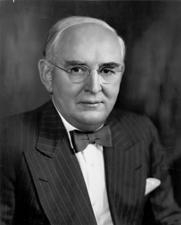

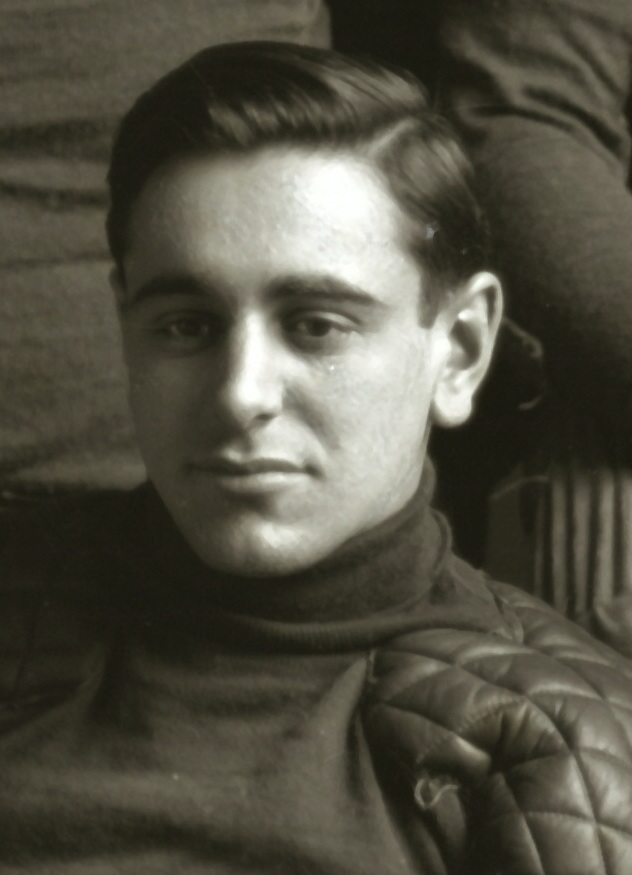
Nominee	Arthur Vandenberg	Frank Picard
Party	Republican	Democratic
Popular vote	626,017	573,574
Percentage	51.32%	47.03%
- County results Vandenberg: 40–50% 50–60% 60–70% Picard: 40–50% 50–60% 60–70%
U.S. senator before election
Arthur Vandenberg
Republican
Elected U.S. Senator
Arthur Vandenberg
Republican

The 1934 United States Senate election in Michigan was held on November 6, 1934.

Republican Senator Arthur Vandenberg was re-elected to a second consecutive term over Democrat Frank Picard.

== Democratic primary ==
=== Candidates ===
- Claude Carney, candidate for governor in 1932
- Alva M. Cummins, attorney and perennial candidate
- Frank Picard, former Saginaw City Attorney and World War I veteran
- Ray D. Schneider

=== Results ===
1934 Democratic U.S. Senate primary
Party	Candidate	Votes	%
Democratic	Frank Picard	101,052	42.92%
Democratic	Ray Schneider	60,042	25.50%
Democratic	Claude Carney	44,138	18.75%
Democratic	Alva Cummins	30,195	12.82%
Total votes		235,427	100.00%

== General election ==
=== Results ===
1934 U.S. Senate election in Michigan
Party	Candidate	Votes	%	±%
Republican	Arthur Vandenberg (incumbent)	626,017	51.32%	▼20.47
Democratic	Frank Picard	573,574	47.03%	▲19.38
Socialist	John Monarch	10,644	0.87%	▲0.66
Communist	Philip Raymond	5,634	0.46%	▲0.29
Farmer–Labor	W. Ralph Jones	2,042	0.17%	N/A
Socialist Labor	John Vonica	939	0.08%	▲0.03
Commonwealth	Jay W. Slaughter	735	0.06%	N/A
National	Chester A. Shewlter	147	0.01%	N/A
Total votes		2,000,342	100.00%	N/A
Republican hold				

== See also ==
- 1934 United States Senate elections
