= Alva M. Cummins =

American lawyer

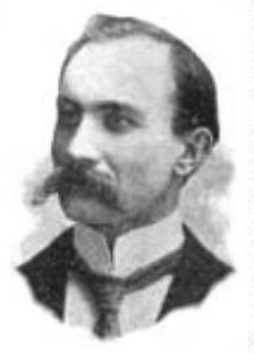
- Cummins c. 1897
- Born: February 24, 1869; Perry, Michigan, U.S.
- Died: August 8, 1946 (aged 77); Okemos, Michigan, U.S.
- Education: Kalamazoo College
- Occupation: Lawyer
- Political party: Democratic
- Spouses: Jennie E. Osborn (m. 1892; d. 1898); Fannie Fitch (m. 1900; d. 1942)

Alva Marvin Cummins (February 24, 1869 – August 8, 1946) was an American lawyer. Cummins was admitted to the bar in 1891. From there, he went on to serve in leadership positions at multiple bar associations. Cummins also had a political career marked by several electoral defeats. Cummins was nominated by the Democratic party for positions such as congressman, governor, and state attorney general.

== Early life and education ==
Alva M. Cummins was born on February 24, 1869, in Perry, Michigan, to parents Jeptha and Phebe Cummins. Alva's parents were pioneers from New York. Alva received a public school education. In 1881, Alva's parents moved to Dakota Territory. There, Alva began studying at Groton College. In 1888, the Cummins family moved back to Michigan, settling in Mason. Alva graduated from Kalamazoo College. After studying in the law office of Samuel L. Kilbourne in Lansing, Alva was admitted to the Michigan Bar in 1891.

== Career ==
=== Legal career ===
After being admitted to the bar, in 1891, Cummins started to practice law in Mason. In 1896, Cummins was elected Ingham County Prosecuting Attorney. On January 1, 1897, Cummins formed a partnership with lawyer Louis B. McArthur. In 1899, Cummins moved to Lansing, where he joined the law firm which became known as Thomas, Cummins & Nichols. In 1912, the firm changed its name to Cummins & Nichols. In 1922, Cummins once again began practicing alone as Cummins and Charles W. Nichols dissolved the firm. By 1938, Cummins was part of a firm entitled Cummins & Cummins. Cummins served as the chairman of the commission which drafted the Michigan Judicature Act of 1915, which recodified Michigan court procedure. Cummins was a part of several bar associations, including the Lansing Bar Association, the Ingham County Bar Association which he had been the dean of, the State Bar of Michigan which he served as the president of, and the American Bar Association.

=== Political career ===
Cummins was a lifelong Democrat who made several unsuccessful attempts to run for political office in his life. Cummins served four years on the Lansing Board of Education. Cummins was a member of the Michigan Democratic State Central Committee in 1907. In 1908, Cummins was a delegate to the Democratic National Convention. Cummins was the Democratic nominee for the United States House of Representatives seat representing the 6th congressional district in 1910 and 1912. In 1922, Cummins served as the chairman of the Democratic state advisory convention, with no intention to run for office himself, however, without Cummins' prior knowledge, the convention nominated him for governor. In the September Democratic primary, Cummins won against the only other candidate, James B. Balch, former mayor of Kalamazoo. Cummins was defeated by incumbent Republican Alex J. Groesbeck in the general election on November 7. Cummins received 218,252 votes, compared to Groesbeck's 356,933. Cummins again served as a delegate to the Democratic National Convention in 1924. There, he presented Governor Woodbridge N. Ferris as a potential presidential nominee. In 1926, Cummins was the Democratic nominee for Michigan Attorney General, ultimately being defeated by William W. Potter. Cummins received 154,031 votes compared to Potter's 415,981. In 1934, Cummins was a candidate for the United States Senate, but he was defeated in the primary.

Despite being a Democrat, Cummins was appointed to some positions by Republican governors. Governor Fred W. Green appointed Cummins to the public utilities commission, which he served on from May 1929 to June 1931. Governor Luren Dickinson appointed Cummins to the liquor control commission in 1940.

== Personal life ==
Cummins married Jennie Osborn on May 25, 1892. Together, they had one daughter. Jennie died on April 19, 1898. On February 22, 1900, Cummins married Fannie Fitch. Fannie's grandfather, Ferris S. Fitch, and her father, Charles C. Fitch, were both prominent Democratic politicians who served in the Michigan Legislature. Together, they had two children. Fannie died on May 13, 1942, and was interred at Maple Grove Cemetery in Mason. Cummins was a Freemason and a member of the Rotary Club.

== Later life and death ==
In 1944, Cummins moved to Florida for retirement after illness prevented him from being active in political and legal affairs. In 1946, Cummins visited his son, Charles Fitch Cummins, and stayed at his house near Okemos. While visiting, Cummins died of a heart attack on August 8.

Party political offices
Preceded by Woodbridge N. Ferris	Democratic nominee for Governor of Michigan; 1922	Succeeded by Edward Frensdorf
