= Edward J. Viall =

American politician

73rd / 11th City Commission Mayor of the City of Flint, Michigan
- In office 1946–1948
- Preceded by: Edwin C. McLogan
- Succeeded by: George G. Wills

City Commissioner of the City of Flint, Michigan

Personal details
- Born: c. 1890
- Died: March 28, 1950 (aged 59–60) Genesee County, Michigan

Edward J. Viall (c. 1890 – March 28, 1950) was a Michigan politician.

== Political life ==
The Flint City Commission selected him as mayor in 1946 and select again for another year.

Political offices
Preceded by Edwin C. McLogan	Mayor of Flint; 1946–1948	Succeeded by George G. Wills
