= 1946 United States Senate election in Michigan =

- November 5, 1946
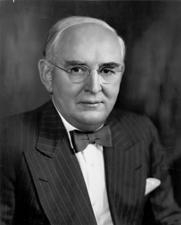

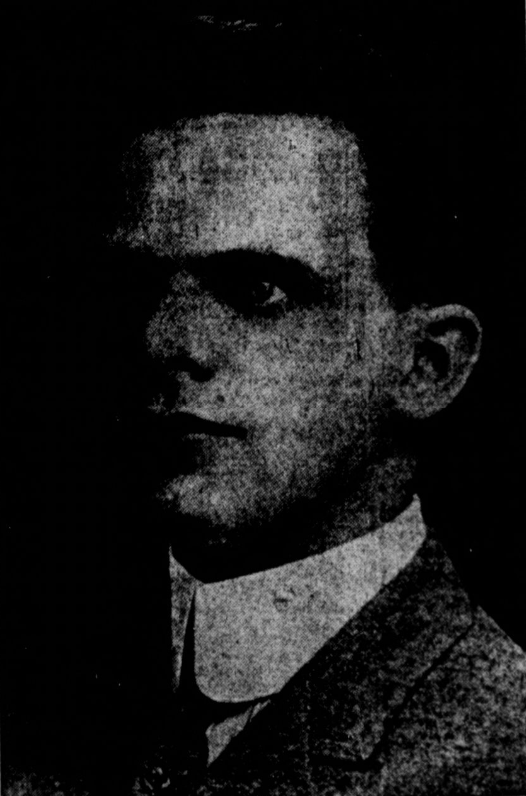
Nominee	Arthur Vandenberg	James H. Lee
Party	Republican	Democratic
Popular vote	1,085,570	517,923
Percentage	67.06%	32.00%
- County results Vandenberg: 50–60% 60–70% 70–80% 80–90%
U.S. senator before election
Arthur Vandenberg
Republican
Elected U.S. Senator
Arthur Vandenberg
Republican

The 1946 United States Senate election in Michigan was held on November 5, 1946.

Republican Senator Arthur Vandenberg was re-elected to a fourth consecutive term in a landslide over Democrat James H. Lee.

== General election ==
=== Candidates ===
- Hugo Beiswenger (Communist)
- Theos A. Grove (Socialist Labor)
- James H. Lee, candidate for U.S. Representative in 1920 (Democratic)
- Lawrence A. Ruble (Prohibition)
- Arthur Vandenberg, incumbent Senator since 1928 (Republican)

=== Results ===
1946 U.S. Senate election in Michigan
Party	Candidate	Votes	%	±%
Republican	Arthur Vandenberg (incumbent)	1,085,570	67.06%	▲14.41
Democratic	James H. Lee	517,923	32.00%	▼14.98
Prohibition	Lawrence A. Ruble	8,109	0.50%	▲0.45
Socialist Labor	Theos Grove	4,572	0.28%	▲0.24
Communist	Hugo Beiswenger	2,546	0.16%	▲0.05
Total votes		1,618,720	100.00%	N/A
Republican hold				

== See also ==
- 1946 United States Senate elections
