= Edwin C. McLogan =

American politician (1889–1949)

72nd / 10th City Commission Mayor of the City of Flint, Michigan
- In office 1944–1946
- Preceded by: William Osmund Kelly
- Succeeded by: Edward J. Viall

City Commissioner of the City of Flint, Michigan

Personal details
- Born: March 31, 1889 Chicago, Illinois
- Died: October 12, 1949 (aged 60) Genesee County, Michigan

Edwin Carroll McLogan (March 31, 1889 – October 12, 1949) was a Michigan politician.

== Political life ==
The Flint City Commission selected him as mayor in 1944 and selected him again for another year.

Political offices
Preceded by William Osmund Kelly	Mayor of Flint; 1944–1946	Succeeded by Edward J. Viall
