= 1945–1946 General Motors strike =

Labor disputes between the United Auto Workers and General Motors

1945-46 United Auto Workers strike
- Date: November 21, 1945 – March 13, 1946
- Location: United States
- Goals: Wage increases of 17.5% an hour, paid vacations, overtime
- Methods: Strikes, Demonstrations

Parties
| Walter Reuther; United Auto Workers | General Motors |

Number
| 320,000 | |

From November 21, 1945, to March 13, 1946 (113 days), CIO's United Automobile Workers (UAW), organized "320,000 hourly workers" to form a nationwide strike against General Motors, workers used the tactic of the sit down strike. It was "the longest strike against a major manufacturer" that the UAW had yet seen, and it was also "the longest national GM strike in its history".

As director of the UAW's General Motors Department (coordinator of union relations with GM), Walter Reuther suggested to his colleagues the idea of striking the GM manufacturing plants with a 'one-at-a-time' strategy, which was "intended to maximize pressure on the target company." Reuther also put forth the demands of the strikers: a 30 percent increase in wages and a hold on product prices. However, the strike ended to the dissatisfaction of Walter Reuther and the UAW, and the workers received only a 17.5-percent increase in wages. However, the strike also earned Reuther more prominence within the UAW, and he was soon afterwards elected UAW President.

== Reuther leads way ==
The story of the UAW-CIO strike against GM in 1945–1946 is very much a story of Walter Reuther. Reuther argued, on behalf of the UAW, that the 'inordinate productivity' of modern technology put the power of creating 'permanent prosperity' into the hands of the Americans. But instead, Reuther claimed that the controllers of that technology in the auto industry used the power to "maximize profits by pursuing a program of 'planned scarcity'" (therefore driving up product prices) while cutting jobs. The corrupt system caused a cycle of problems, and the limited work hours meant that Americans could not even purchase the limited goods produced. This, in effect, meant that "social needs went unmet: forced to compete for high-priced materials, municipalities could not afford to build new schools and hospitals, states could not afford to build roads and bridges, and workers could not afford to build homes". Walter Reuther's statement in 1944 explained his central thesis; He said, "It is my determined belief that there can be no permanent prosperity.. so long as the controls of production remain in the hands of a privileged minority".

Reuther followed Thorstein Veblen's take on corporate enterprise. For the auto industry, the idea was that corporations would use new technologies to speed up production and were therefore able to cut jobs, and of course, as unemployment goes up, wages go down because work is more scarce and people are willing to work for whatever they can find. Not to mention, the technology had broken the automobile industry down into repetitive processes that required little-to-no skill and no educational credentials. That gave the corporate elites great power over price controls, wage settings, and overall decision makings. Reuther was taking a stand against the powerful corporate enterprise and advocating the "democratization of industry," which was exactly his view of what should be implemented, and it showed through his demands in the UAW-GM bargain.

== Bargaining and results ==
Reuther recruited many professionals in relative fields for various UAW branch offices. Among them was Donald E. Montgomery, a liberal economist and professional in New Deal laws and regulations, who was designated "as consumer counsel and representative in the UAW's Washington office". And based on a Keynesian economic lens, formulated by Montgomery, Reuther put forth the UAW's demands for the UAW-GM Strike of 1945–46, demanding an increase in hourly wages by 30 percent and a halt on automobile prices. However, Reuther's requisitions were instantly rejected by GM. A GM spokesman argued that the corporation "could not afford such a large wage increase.. and it would not surrender its exclusive right to determine product pricing". Therefore, Reuther then offered a subsequent wager: he put forth a new proposal that would allow a smaller increase in wages if GM "would prove its inability to pay by 'opening its books'". GM quickly moved into a defensive position; the corporation declined to release any information that was traditionally known as being 'the sole responsibility of the corporation' (i.e. setting product prices). In fact, GM went a step further and declared Reuther's demands to be "un-American and socialist". That was not too far from the common criticisms that Reuther had received in the past.

However, the possibility for success in Reuther's demands had shrunk "early in the year [1946], when both the United Steelworkers and the United Electrical Workers accepted wage increases of 17.5 percent from their employers". In fact, this had a direct influence on the UAW-GM bargaining deal. The result, on March 13, 1946, was a raise of "18 1/2 cents an hour [17.5 percent], paid vacations, overtime and other changes". Also, GM workers did not gain access to determining product pricing".

== Significance ==
Reuther's proposal was extraordinary because of its timing. After World War II, during demobilization, many auto-companies were slowing production and raising prices because their contracts from the government were expiring. This made what Reuther was doing very important for promoting "the Truman administration's efforts to sustain price controls and working-class living standards." Instead of trying only to get auto workers higher pay and a better situation, he was also thinking about the economic situation of the collective communities to function in the most socially-beneficial way in the circumstances after World War II.

Despite the so-called failure of the UAW to achieve Reuther's demands, he was made President of the UAW in 1946 in large part because of the leadership he showed during the strike. Reuther, who remained UAW President until his death in 1970, would in 1948 successfully pressure GM to give workers a historic contract which tied wage increases to the general cost-of-living and productivity increases.

== See also ==
- Strike wave of 1946
- List of US strikes by size
