= Zephaniah (name) =

Zephaniah is both a given name and surname. The name is of Hebrew origin and it means "God has hidden".

Notable people with the name include:

- Zephaniah Webster Bunce (1787–1889), American businessman
- Zephaniah Kingsley Sr. (1734–1792), British merchant
- Zephaniah Kingsley (1765–1843), American planter
- Zephaniah Legumana, bishop
- Zephaniah Alexander Looby (1899–1972), American lawyer
- Zephaniah Swift Moore (1770–1823), American Congregational clergyman
- Zephaniah Ncube (born 1957), Zimbabwean long-distance runner
- Zephaniah Platt (1735–1807), American politician
- Zephaniah Platt (1796–1871), American politician
- Zephaniah C. Platt (1805–1884), American farmer, banker, and politician
- Zephaniah Skinner (born 1989), Australian rules footballer
- Zephaniah Swift (1759–1823), American author
- Zephaniah Thomas (born 1989), English footballer
- Zephaniah Turner Jr. (1812–1876), American politician
- Zephaniah Williams (1795–1874), Welsh Chartist
- Benjamin Zephaniah (1958–2023), British writer and dub poet with West Indian roots
- John Zephaniah Bell (1794–1883), Scottish artist
- John Zephaniah Holwell (1711–1798), British surgeon
- Dewi Zephaniah Phillips (1934–2006), Welsh philosopher
- Charles Zephaniah Platt (1773–1822), American politician

== See also ==
- Zeph (given name)
