= List of people who have served in all three branches of a U.S. state government =

A number of individuals have achieved the rare distinction of serving in all three branches of the state government of one of the U.S. states:

- in the executive branch (in an elected position, such as governor or state attorney general), or in a senior state appointed position (such as a member of the governor's cabinet, the principal of a state agency, or member of a state executive board or commission); (Note: For instance, this list would exclude those whose only state-level executive service was as a deputy state attorney general or assistant state attorney general.)
- in the state legislature; and
- as a state judge.

This list excludes service in local government (such as county or city government), as well as military and militia posts.

== List ==
Name		State	Legislative	Executive	Judicial	Party (Note: Parties listed are during their tenure in state office across the three branches.)	Ref(s)
	Chester Aldrich	Nebraska	Nebraska Senate (1907)	Governor of Nebraska (1911–1913)	Justice of the Nebraska Supreme Court (1918–1924)	Republican	
	Forrest Anderson	Montana	Montana House of Representatives (1943–1945)	Governor of Montana (1968–1972); Attorney General of Montana (1957–1968)	Justice of the Montana Supreme Court (1953–1957)	Democratic	
	Charles Andrews	Connecticut	Connecticut Senate (1868–1870); Connecticut House of Representatives (1878)	Governor of Connecticut (1879–1881)	Judge of the Connecticut Superior Court (1881–1889); Chief Justice of the Connecticut Supreme Court (1889–1901)	Republican	
	Samuel Ashe	North Carolina	North Carolina Senate (1776)	Governor of North Carolina (1795–1798)	Presiding Justice of the North Carolina Superior Court (1777–1795)	Democratic-Republican	
	Thomas Bartley	Ohio	Ohio House of Representatives (1839–1841); Ohio Senate (1841–1845)	Governor of Ohio (1844)	Justice of the Ohio Supreme Court (1852–1859)	Democratic	
	Richard Bassett	Delaware	Delaware Senate (1882); Delaware House of Representatives (1886)	Governor of Delaware (1799–1801)	Chief Justice of the Delaware Court of Common Pleas (1793–1799)	Federalist	
	Elisha Baxter	Arkansas	Arkansas House of Representatives (1854–1855 and 1859–1860)	Governor of Arkansas (1873–1874)	Judge of the Arkansas Circuit Court (1868–1873)	Republican	
	Clark Bissell	Connecticut	Connecticut House of Representatives (1829 and 1841); Connecticut Senate (1842–1843)	Governor of Connecticut (1847–1849)	Justice of the Connecticut Supreme Court (1829–1839)	Whig	
	Thomas Bramlette	Kentucky	Kentucky House of Representatives (1841)	Governor of Kentucky (1863–1867)	Judge of the Kentucky District Court (1856–1861)	Whig (before 1856)	
	Thomas Bramlette	Kentucky	Kentucky House of Representatives (1841)	Governor of Kentucky (1863–1867)	Judge of the Kentucky District Court (1856–1861)	Democratic (1856–1875)	
	Thaddeus Buczko	Massachusetts	Massachusetts House of Representatives (1959–1964)	Auditor of Massachusetts (1964–1981)	Justice of the Massachusetts Probate and Family Court (1981–1996)	Democratic	
	John Burke	North Dakota	North Dakota House of Representatives (1891–1893); North Dakota Senate (1893–1897)	Governor of North Dakota (1907–1913)	Judge of the North Dakota District Court (1889–1891 and 1897–1899); Justice of the North Dakota Supreme Court (1924–1937)	Democratic	
	James Clark	Kentucky	Kentucky House of Representatives (1807–1808)	Governor of Kentucky (1836–1839)	Judge of the Kentucky Court of Appeals (1810–1812); Judge of the Kentucky Circuit Court (1817–1824)	Democratic-Republican (before 1825)	
	James Clark	Kentucky	Kentucky House of Representatives (1807–1808)	Governor of Kentucky (1836–1839)	Judge of the Kentucky Court of Appeals (1810–1812); Judge of the Kentucky Circuit Court (1817–1824)	National Republican (1825–1931)	
	James Clark	Kentucky	Kentucky House of Representatives (1807–1808)	Governor of Kentucky (1836–1839)	Judge of the Kentucky Court of Appeals (1810–1812); Judge of the Kentucky Circuit Court (1817–1824)	Whig (1931–1839)	
	Clement Clay	Alabama	Alabama House of Representatives (1827–1828)	Governor of Alabama (1835–1837)	Justice of the Alabama Supreme Court (1819–1823)	Democratic	
Nathaniel Coe	Nathaniel Coe	New York	New York Assembly (1843–1847)	Comptroller of New York	Justice of the peace	Whig	
	James Coleman	Mississippi	Mississippi House of Representatives (1960–1964)	Attorney General of Mississippi (1950–1956); Governor of Mississippi (1956–1960)	Judge of the Mississippi Circuit Court (1947–1950); Justice of the Mississippi Supreme Court (1950)	Democratic	
	Fred Cowan	Kentucky	Kentucky House of Representatives (1982–1987)	Attorney General of Kentucky (1988–1992)	Judge of the Kentucky Circuit Court (2006–2014)	Democratic	
	Lorenzo Crounse	Nebraska	Nebraska Senate (1901)	Governor of Nebraska (1893–1895)	Justice of the Nebraska Supreme Court (1867–1873)	Republican	
	Benjamin Cruz	Guam	Guam Legislature (2005–2007, 2008–2018)	Auditor of Guam (2018–present)	Justice of the Guam Supreme Court (1997–2001); Chief Justice of the Guam Supreme Court (1999–2001)	Democratic	
	Stephen Douglas	Illinois	Illinois House of Representatives (1836–1837)	Secretary of State of Illinois (1840–1841)	Justice of the Illinois Supreme Court (1841–1843)	Democratic	
	Mack Easley	New Mexico	New Mexico House of Representatives (1951–1952 and 1955–1962); New Mexico Senate (1967–1970)	Lieutenant Governor of New Mexico (1963–1967)	Justice of the New Mexico Supreme Court (1976–1982)	Democratic	
	Alpheus Felch	Michigan	Michigan House of Representatives (1835–1837)	Governor of Michigan (1846–1847); Auditor of Michigan (1842)	Justice of the Michigan Supreme Court (1842–1845)	Democratic	
	Daniel Fowle	North Carolina	North Carolina House of Commons (1862 and 1864–1865) (Note: Confederate legislature.)	Governor of North Carolina (1889–1891)	Judge of the North Carolina Superior Court (1865–1867)	Democratic	
	Junius Futrell	Arkansas	Arkansas House of Representatives (1896–1904); Arkansas Senate (1913–1917)	Governor of Arkansas (1913 and 1933–1937)	Judge of the Arkansas Circuit Court (1922–1933)	Democratic	
	John Gayle	Alabama	Alabama House of Representatives (1822–1823 and 1829–1830)	Governor of Alabama (1831–1835)	Judge of the Alabama Circuit Court (1823–1825); Justice of the Alabama Supreme Court (1828–1829)	Whig	
	Charles Haden	West Virginia	West Virginia House of Delegates (1963–1964)	Tax Commissioner of West Virginia (1969–1972)	Justice of the West Virginia Supreme Court (1972–1975)	Republican	
	Warren Hearnes	Missouri	Missouri House of Representatives (1951–1961)	Secretary of State of Missouri (1961–1965); Governor of Missouri (1965–1973)	Judge of the Missouri Circuit Court (1980)	Democratic	
	Paul Herbert	Ohio	Ohio House of Representatives (1922–1926); Ohio Senate (1926–1930)	Lieutenant Governor of Ohio (1939–1945, 1947–1949, and 1957–1959)	Justice of the Ohio Supreme Court (1963–1968)	Republican	
	Richard Hopkins	Kansas	Kansas House of Representatives (1909–1911)	Lieutenant Governor of Kansas (1911–1913); Attorney General of Kansas (1919–1923)	Justice of the Kansas Supreme Court (1923–1929)	Republican	
	Clark Hull	Connecticut	Connecticut Senate (1963–1971)	Lieutenant Governor of Connecticut (1971–1973)	Judge of the Connecticut Superior Court (1973–1983); Judge of the Connecticut Appellate Court (1983–1987); Justice of the Connecticut Supreme Court (1987–1991)	Republican	
	Frank Huskins	North Carolina	North Carolina House of Representatives (1947–1949)	Chair of the North Carolina Industrial Commission (1949–1955)	Judge of the North Carolina Superior Court (1955–1965); Justice of the North Carolina Supreme Court (1968–1982)	Democratic	
	John Ireland	Texas	Texas House of Representatives (1873–1874); Texas Senate (1874–1876)	Governor of Texas (1883–1887)	Justice of the Texas Supreme Court (1875–1879)	Democratic	
	Fred Johnson	Nebraska	Nebraska House of Representatives (1907–1909 and 1917–1919); Nebraska Senate (1919–1920)	Lieutenant Governor of Nebraska (1923–1925)	Judge of the Nebraska District Court (1945–1951)	Republican	
	Sandy Keith	Minnesota	Minnesota Senate (1959–1963)	Lieutenant Governor of Minnesota (1963–1967)	Justice of the Minnesota Supreme Court (1989–1990); Chief Justice of the Minnesota Supreme Court (1990–1998)	Democratic	
	Wayne Kidwell	Idaho	Idaho Senate (1969–1973)	Attorney General of Idaho (1975–1979)	Justice of the Idaho Supreme Court (1999–2005)	Republican	
	Ted Kulongoski	Oregon	Oregon House of Representatives (1975–1978); Oregon State Senate (1978–1983)	Attorney General of Oregon (1993–1997); Governor of Oregon (2003–2011)	Justice of the Oregon Supreme Court (1997–2001)	Democratic	
	Frank Licht	Rhode Island	Rhode Island Senate (1949–1956)	Governor of Rhode Island (1969–1973)	Associate Justice of the Rhode Island Superior Court (1963–1968)	Democratic	
	Richard Licht	Rhode Island	Rhode Island Senate (1973–1984)	Lieutenant Governor of Rhode Island (1985–1989); Rhode Island Director of Administration (2010–2014)	Associate Justice of the Rhode Island Superior Court (2014–present)	Democratic	
	Levi Lincoln	Massachusetts	Massachusetts Senate (1812–1814, 1844–1845); Massachusetts House of Representatives (1814–1823)	Lieutenant Governor of Massachusetts (1823–1824); Governor of Massachusetts (1825–1834)	Associate Justice of the Massachusetts Supreme Court (1824–1825)	Democratic-Republican (before 1825)	
	Levi Lincoln	Massachusetts	Massachusetts Senate (1812–1814, 1844–1845); Massachusetts House of Representatives (1814–1823)	Lieutenant Governor of Massachusetts (1823–1824); Governor of Massachusetts (1825–1834)	Associate Justice of the Massachusetts Supreme Court (1824–1825)	National Republican (1825–1837)	
	Levi Lincoln	Massachusetts	Massachusetts Senate (1812–1814, 1844–1845); Massachusetts House of Representatives (1814–1823)	Lieutenant Governor of Massachusetts (1823–1824); Governor of Massachusetts (1825–1834)	Associate Justice of the Massachusetts Supreme Court (1824–1825)	Whig (1837–1854)	
	William Lord	Oregon	Oregon State Senate (1879–1880)	Governor of Oregon (1895–1899)	Justice of the Oregon Supreme Court (1878–1894)	Republican	
	Charles Lynch	Mississippi	Mississippi Senate (1827–1835)	Governor of Mississippi (1833 and 1836–1838)	Judge of the Mississippi Probate Court (1821–1827)	Democratic (before 1833)	
	Charles Lynch	Mississippi	Mississippi Senate (1827–1835)	Governor of Mississippi (1833 and 1836–1838)	Judge of the Mississippi Probate Court (1821–1827)	Whig (1833–1853)	
	Thomas Mabry	New Mexico	New Mexico Senate (1912–1917)	Governor of New Mexico (1947–1951)	Judge of the New Mexico District Court (1937–1939); Justice of the New Mexico Supreme Court (1938–1946)	Democratic	
	Isaac Marston	Michigan	Michigan House of Representatives (1872–1873)	Attorney General of Michigan (1874–1875)	Justice of the Michigan Supreme Court (1875–1883)	Republican	
	Charles McCurdy	Connecticut	Connecticut House of Representatives (1827–1832); Connecticut Senate (1832–1844)	Lieutenant Governor of Connecticut (1847–1849)	Judge of the Connecticut Superior Court (1855–1863); Justice of the Connecticut Supreme Court (1863–1867)	Whig	
	William Minor	Connecticut	Connecticut Senate (1854–1855); Connecticut House of Representatives (1867)	Governor of Connecticut (1855–1857)	Justice of the Connecticut Supreme Court (1868–1873)	Whig (before 1855)	
	William Minor	Connecticut	Connecticut Senate (1854–1855); Connecticut House of Representatives (1867)	Governor of Connecticut (1855–1857)	Justice of the Connecticut Supreme Court (1868–1873)	Know Nothing (1855–1857)	
	William Minor	Connecticut	Connecticut Senate (1854–1855); Connecticut House of Representatives (1867)	Governor of Connecticut (1855–1857)	Justice of the Connecticut Supreme Court (1868–1873)	Republican (1857–1889)	
	Alfred Moore	North Carolina	North Carolina General Assembly	Attorney General of North Carolina (1782–1792)	Judge of the North Carolina Superior Court (1798–1799)	Federalist	
	Andrew Moore	Alabama	Alabama House of Representatives (1839–1845)	Governor of Alabama (1857–1861)	Judge of the Alabama Circuit Court (1851–1857)	Democratic	
	Dan Moore	North Carolina	North Carolina House of Representatives (1941)	Governor of North Carolina (1965–1969)	Judge of the North Carolina Superior Court (1948–1958)	Democratic	
	Samuel Moore	Alabama	Alabama House of Representatives (1823); Alabama Senate (1828–1835)	Governor of Alabama (1831)	Judge of the Alabama District Court (1835–1841)	Democratic	
	Marcus Morton	Massachusetts	Massachusetts House of Representatives (1858)	Lieutenant Governor of Massachusetts (1824–1825); Governor of Massachusetts (1825, 1840–1841, 1843–1844)	Associate Justice of the Massachusetts Supreme Court (1825–1840)	Democratic-Republican (before 1825)	
	Marcus Morton	Massachusetts	Massachusetts House of Representatives (1858)	Lieutenant Governor of Massachusetts (1824–1825); Governor of Massachusetts (1825, 1840–1841, 1843–1844)	Associate Justice of the Massachusetts Supreme Court (1825–1840)	Democratic (1825–1848)	
	Marcus Morton	Massachusetts	Massachusetts House of Representatives (1858)	Lieutenant Governor of Massachusetts (1824–1825); Governor of Massachusetts (1825, 1840–1841, 1843–1844)	Associate Justice of the Massachusetts Supreme Court (1825–1840)	Free Soil (1848–1860)	
	Charles Mullan	Iowa	Iowa Senate (1898–1901)	Attorney General of Iowa (1901–1907)	Judge of the Iowa District Court (1913–1919)	Republican	
	Gordon Mydland	South Dakota	South Dakota Senate (1963–1968)	Attorney General of South Dakota (1969–1973)	Judge of the South Dakota Circuit Court (1973–1987)	Republican	
	Nathaniel Niles	Vermont	Vermont House of Representatives (1784–1785)	Vermont Executive Council (1785 and 1787); Vermont Governor's Council (1803–1809)	Justice of the Vermont Supreme Court (1784–1788)	Anti-Administration (before 1792)	
	Nathaniel Niles	Vermont	Vermont House of Representatives (1784–1785)	Vermont Executive Council (1785 and 1787); Vermont Governor's Council (1803–1809)	Justice of the Vermont Supreme Court (1784–1788)	Democratic-Republican (1792–1828)	
	William O'Neill	Ohio	Ohio House of Representatives (1939–1950)	Attorney General of Ohio (1951–1957); Governor of Ohio (1957–1959)	Justice of the Ohio Supreme Court (1960–1970); Chief Justice of the Ohio Supreme Court (1970–1978)	Republican	
	Steven Pierce	Massachusetts	Massachusetts House of Representatives (1979–1991)	Massachusetts Secretary of Communities and Development (1991)	Chief Justice of the Massachusetts Housing Court (2002–2015)	Republican	
	Elisha Potter	Rhode Island	Rhode Island House of Representatives (1838–1840); Rhode Island Senate (1847–1852 and 1861–1863)	Rhode Island Commissioner of Public Schools (1849–1854)	Justice of the Rhode Island Supreme Court (1868–1882)	Whig (before 1842, 1847–1858)	
	Elisha Potter	Rhode Island	Rhode Island House of Representatives (1838–1840); Rhode Island Senate (1847–1852 and 1861–1863)	Rhode Island Commissioner of Public Schools (1849–1854)	Justice of the Rhode Island Supreme Court (1868–1882)	Law and Order (1842–1847)	
	Elisha Potter	Rhode Island	Rhode Island House of Representatives (1838–1840); Rhode Island Senate (1847–1852 and 1861–1863)	Rhode Island Commissioner of Public Schools (1849–1854)	Justice of the Rhode Island Supreme Court (1868–1882)	Democratic (1858–1882)	
	William Potter	Michigan	Michigan Senate (1899–1900)	Member of the Michigan Public Utilities Commission (1919–1927); Attorney General of Michigan (1927–1928)	Justice of the Michigan Supreme Court (1928–1940)	Republican	
	John Rankin	Iowa	Iowa House of Representatives (1921–1927)	Attorney General of Iowa (1940–1947)	Judge of the Iowa District Court (1925–1938)	Republican	
	Daniel Russell	North Carolina	North Carolina House of Commons (1864–1866)	Governor of North Carolina (1897–1901)	Judge of the North Carolina Superior Court (1868–1874)	Republican	
	Romulus Saunders	North Carolina	North Carolina House of Commons (1815, 1817–1820, and 1848–1852); North Carolina Senate (1816)	Attorney General of North Carolina (1828–1831)	Judge of the North Carolina Superior Court (1835–1940)	Democratic	
	Bill Schuette	Michigan	Michigan Senate (1995–2003)	Director of the Michigan Department of Agriculture (1991–1993); Attorney General of Michigan (2011–2019)	Judge of the Michigan Court of Appeals (2003–2009)	Republican	
	William Sharkey	Mississippi	Mississippi House of Representatives (1828–1829)	Governor of Mississippi (1865)	Judge of the Mississippi Circuit Court (1832); Justice of the Mississippi Supreme Court (1832–1851)	Whig	
	James Shields	Illinois	Illinois House of Representatives (1836)	Auditor of Illinois (1841–1843)	Justice of the Illinois Supreme Court (1843–1845)	Democratic	
	Samuel Smith	Maine	Maine House of Representatives (1820–1821)	Governor of Maine (1831–1834)	Chief Justice of the Maine Circuit Court of Common Pleas (1821); Justice of the Maine Court of Common Pleas (1822–1830 and 1835–1837)	Democratic	
	Samuel Southard	New Jersey	New Jersey General Assembly (1815)	Governor of New Jersey (1832–1833)	Justice of the New Jersey Supreme Court (1815–1820)	Democratic-Republican (before 1825)	
	Samuel Southard	New Jersey	New Jersey General Assembly (1815)	Governor of New Jersey (1832–1833)	Justice of the New Jersey Supreme Court (1815–1820)	National Republican (1825–1832)	
	Samuel Southard	New Jersey	New Jersey General Assembly (1815)	Governor of New Jersey (1832–1833)	Justice of the New Jersey Supreme Court (1815–1820)	Whig (1832–1842)	
	Chauncey Sparks	Alabama	Alabama House of Representatives (1919–1923 and 1931–1939)	Governor of Alabama (1943–1947)	Judge of the Alabama Inferior Court (1911–1915)	Democratic	
	David Stone	North Carolina	North Carolina House of Commons (1791–1794 and 1811–1812)	Governor of North Carolina (1808–1810)	Judge of the North Carolina Superior Court (1974–1798)	Democratic-Republican	
	David Swain	North Carolina	North Carolina House of Representatives (1824–1830)	Governor of North Carolina (1832–1835)	Judge of the North Carolina Superior Court (1830–1832)	Whig	
	John Swainson	Michigan	Michigan Senate (1954–1958)	Lieutenant Governor of Michigan (1959–1961); Governor of Michigan (1961–1963)	Justice of the Michigan Supreme Court (1971–1975)	Democratic	
	Lacy Thornburg	North Carolina	North Carolina House of Representatives (1961–1966)	Attorney General of North Carolina (1985–1993)	Judge of the North Carolina Superior Court (1967–1983)	Democratic	
	Charles Upson	Michigan	Michigan Senate (1855–1856 and 1881–1882)	Attorney General of Michigan (1861–1862)	Judge of the Michigan Circuit Court (1869–1872)	Republican	
	Samuel Wells	Maine	Maine House of Representatives (1836–1840)	Governor of Maine (1856–1857)	Justice of the Maine Supreme Court (1847–1854)	Republican	
	Otis Whitney	Massachusetts	Massachusetts House of Representatives (1937–1943)	Massachusetts Commissioner of Public Safety (1953–1959)	Presiding Justice of the Concord District Court (1962–1968)	Republican	
	Isaac Wilbour	Rhode Island	Rhode Island House of Representatives (1805–1806)	Lieutenant Governor of Rhode Island (1806–1807 and 1810–1811)	Justice of the Rhode Island Supreme Court (1818–1819); Chief Justice of the Rhode Island Supreme Court (1819–1827)	Democratic-Republican	
	George Wilson	Iowa	Iowa Senate (1925–1935)	Governor of Iowa (1939–1943)	Judge of the Iowa District Court (1917–1921)	Republican	

== See also ==
- List of people who have served in all three branches of the United States federal government
- List of people who have held multiple United States Cabinet-level positions
- List of United States Supreme Court Justices who also served in Congress
