= Senator Platt =

Senator Platt may refer to:

== Members of the United States Senate ==
- Orville H. Platt (1827–1905), U.S. Senator from Connecticut from 1879 to 1905
- Thomas C. Platt (1833–1910), U.S. Senator from New York in 1881 and from 1897 to 1909

== United States state senate members ==
- Frank C. Platt (1866–1952), New York State Senate
- Jonas Platt (1769–1834), New York State Senate
- Moss K. Platt (1809–1876), New York State Senate
- Nehemiah Platt (1797–1851), New York State Senate
- Zephaniah Platt (1735–1807), New York State Senate
