= Mary Platt Parmele =

American historian and writer

- Born: Mary Platt; July 14, 1843; Albany, New York, U.S.
- Died: May 26, 1911 (age 67); New York, New York, U.S.
- Occupation: Writer
- Father: Zephaniah Platt
- Relatives: Jonas Platt (grandfather)

Mary Platt Parmele (July 14, 1843 – May 26, 1911) was an American historian and writer.

== Early life ==
Parmele was born in Albany, New York and educated in New York. She was the daughter of Zephaniah Platt and Cornelia Jenkins Platt. Her father was the Michigan Attorney General, and her grandfather was U.S. Representative Jonas Platt.

== Career ==
From 1892 Parmele contributed philosophical articles and short stories to reviews and magazines. Her most successful books were a number of "Short History" books of various countries written in the late 19th and early 20th century. Her "Short History of ..." books included volumes on France, Russia, England, United States, Germany, Spain, and Italy. Her style was appreciated by critics as readable, lively, and comprehensive.

Parmele ventured beyond straight historical writing with Ariel, or the Author's World (1892), in which a character has the power to transport himself to a planet orbiting Earth, "created by atoms obeying the wills of writers", thus inhabited by fictional creations such as Frankenstein's monster. Parmele was critical of the claims of Christian Science. In 1904, she published a book that argued against the claims of Christian Science.

== Publications ==
- Answered in the Negative (1892, two stories)
- The Evolution of an Empire: A Brief Historical Sketch of France (1894)
- A Short History of England (1898)
- A Short History of France (1898)
- A Short History of Germany (1898)
- A Short History of Spain (1898)
- A Short History of the United States (1898)
- Ariel, or the Author's World (1898, chapbook)
- The Kingdom of the Invisible (1902)
- Christian Science: Is it Christian? Is it Scientific? (1904)
- A Short History of England, Ireland, and Scotland (1907)
- A Short History of Rome and Italy (1907)
- A Short History of Russia (1907)

== Personal life ==
Mary Platt married twice. Her first marriage was to Samuel J. Agnew; they had two sons, Howard and Holmes, and divorced. In 1870, she married her cousin, widower Theodore Weld Parmele; he died in 1893. She lived with Mrs. J. J. Tierney in her last years, and died when she was struck by a motorcycle in 1911, at the age of 67, in New York City. Her son Holmes Agnew was institutionalized at the time of her death. Her grave is in Brooklyn's historic Green-Wood Cemetery.
