= Archibald K. Dougherty =

American politician (1835–1923)

Member of the Michigan House of Representatives from the Charlevoix County district
- In office January 1, 1887 – 1888

Personal details
- Born: June 26, 1835 Saint John, New Brunswick, Canada
- Died: December 30, 1923 (aged 88) Lansing, Michigan, US
- Party: Republican

Archibald K. Dougherty (June 26, 1835 – December 30, 1923) was a Michigan politician.

== Early life ==
Dougherty was born on June 26, 1835, in Saint John, New Brunswick, Canada.

== Career ==
On November 2, 1886, Dougherty was elected as a Republican member of the Michigan House of Representatives where he represented Charlevoix County and served from January 5, 1887, to 1888.

== Personal life ==
Dougherty had at least four children, including Michigan Attorney General Andrew B. Dougherty.

== Death ==
Dougherty died on December 30, 1923, in Lansing, Michigan. Dougherty was interred at Maple Grove Cemetery in Elk Rapids, Michigan.
