= Zephaniah (disambiguation) =

Zephaniah may refer to:

- Zephaniah, name of several people in the Bible Old Testament and Jewish Tanakh
- Zephaniah (name)
- Book of Zephaniah, book
- Apocalypse of Zephaniah, pseudepigraphic text
- Zephaniah Kingsley Plantation Home and Buildings, site of a former estate in Jacksonville, Florida

== See also ==
- Zeph (disambiguation)
- Zephania
