= Parmele =

Parmele may refer to:

- Parmele, North Carolina
- Jalen Parmele (born 1985), U.S. football player
- Mary Platt Parmele (1843–1911), U.S. author and historian
