= Lewis W. Pierce =

American politician

Lewis Woodward Pierce (November 10, 1810 – January 26, 1882) was an American politician from Plattsburgh, New York.

== Life ==
Pierce was born on November 10, 1810, in Jackson, New York, the son of Earl Pierce.

In 1821, Pierce moved to AuSable with his parents. He attended the Keeseville and Portland academies. In 1831, he moved to Jay, where he was involved in the sale of goods and manufacture of iron. When his father died in 1836, he returned to AuSable and became the acting administrator of his father's estate. In 1849, he moved to Plattsburgh. He almost continuously held a town office from 1833 to 1850. He served as Deputy Collector of Customs and Clerk in the Custom House at Plattsburgh from 1851 to 1854. In 1853, he was elected County Clerk of Clinton County, an office he held for three years.

Pierce was elected County Clerk as a Whig. In 1858, he was elected to the New York State Assembly with a union of the Republican and American parties, representing Clinton County. He was elected over the Democratic incumbent Zephaniah C. Platt. He served in the Assembly in 1859. He then spent five years serving as cashier and clerk of Clinton Prison. In 1864, he was named deputy collector, clerk, cashier, and special deputy of the Plattsburgh Custom House. He retired from there in 1876.

Pierce was an Elder in the Presbyterian Church. In 1834, he married Perley H. Sanford, daughter of Reuben Sanford. Their children were Edgar W., Ann M., Mary H., Fred E., and Martha E.

Pierce died at home on January 26, 1882. His funeral was held at his home, with the local clergymen conducting the service. He was buried in Riverside Cemetery.

New York State Assembly
Preceded by Zephaniah C. Platt	New York State Assembly; Clinton County; 1859	Succeeded by Henry McFadden
