= Charles Z. Platt =

American politician

New York State Treasurer
- In office 1813–1817
- Preceded by: David Thomas
- Succeeded by: Gerrit L. Dox

Personal details
- Born: Charles Zephaniah Platt; July 22, 1773; Poughkeepsie, New York
- Died: April 14, 1822 (aged 48); Greenbush, Rensselaer County, New York
- Political party: Federalist
- Spouse: Sarah Bleecker (m. 1803)
- Relations: Jonas Platt (brother); Zephaniah Platt (nephew)
- Children: 6
- Parent(s): Zephaniah Platt; Mary Van Wyck Platt

Charles Zephaniah Platt (July 22, 1773 – April 14, 1822) was an American politician.

== Life ==
Platt was born on July 22, 1773, in Poughkeepsie, New York. He was one of twelve children born to Mary Van Wyck Platt (1743–1809) and Zephaniah Platt (1735–1807), a politician and lawyer who founded Plattsburgh, New York. Among his siblings was brother Judge Jonas Platt.

Through his brother Jonas, he was the uncle of Zephaniah Platt, the Attorney General of Michigan.

== Career ==
He was a member of the New York State Assembly (Oneida Co.) in 1807, and as a Federalist, was New York State Treasurer from 1813 to 1817.

== Personal life ==
On October 4, 1803, he married Sarah Bleecker (1785–1832) at the Dutch Reformed Church in Albany, New York. Sarah was the daughter of James Bleecker and Rachel (née Van Zandt) Bleecker. Together, they were the parents of six children.

Platt died on April 14, 1822, in Greenbush, Rensselaer County, New York.

Political offices
Preceded by David Thomas	New York State Treasurer; 1813–1817	Succeeded by Gerrit L. Dox
