= Daniel LeRoy =

American politician

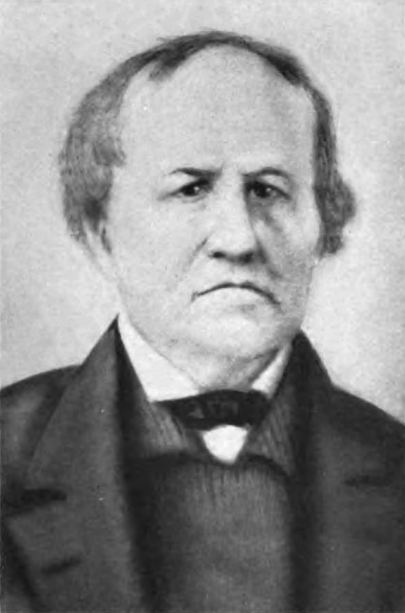

1st Attorney General of the State of Michigan
- In office 1836–1837
- Governor: Stevens T. Mason
- Preceded by: Position established (statehood)
- Succeeded by: Peter Morey

Daniel LeRoy (May 17, 1775 – February 11, 1858; Fenton, Michigan) was the last attorney general for the Michigan Territory, and the first Michigan attorney general.

Born in Poughkeepsie, NY, in 1801 LeRoy moved to Chenango Point. After a bridge to cross the Chenango River was built, he became the first to organise roads and a school on the river's west side. He worked to build a small settlement west of the Chenango, which he purchased from William Bingham's estate. LeRoy held the deed, but for ten years made no payments on its interest or principal, so left New York insolvent with his wife and seven children.

He came to the frontier of Michigan, and by January 20, 1818 was appointed associate justice for Macomb County, Michigan. LeRoy was first appointed by John Quincy Adams as Michigan's territorial attorney in 1826 and served until 1834. He was the first Michigan attorney general from 1836 to 1837.

From 1850 to 1862 what is now Webberville, Michigan was known as LeRoy in his honor.

In 1850, LeRoy moved to Fenton, Michigan and opened its first hotel. He died there on February 11, 1858.

== Sources ==
Legal offices
Preceded by new office	Michigan Attorney General; 1836–1837	Succeeded by Peter Morey
