= Peter Morey =

American politician

2nd Michigan Attorney General
- In office 1837–1841
- Governor: Stevens T. Mason; William Woodbridge
- Preceded by: Daniel LeRoy
- Succeeded by: Zephaniah Platt

Personal details
- Born: 1798 Cazenovia, New York, U.S.
- Died: 1881 (aged 82-83) Marion, Ohio, U.S.
- Party: Democratic

Peter Morey (1798 – 1881) was the 2nd Michigan Attorney General.

== Early life ==
Morey was born in Cazenovia, New York in 1798.

== Career ==
Morey was a Democrat. Morey was admitted to the bar in 1831. He practiced law in New York for four years until in 1835 he moved to Tecumseh, Michigan. In 1837, Morey moved to Detroit. He served as Michigan Attorney General from 1837 to 1841. Morey then moved to back to Tecumseh for some years until finally moving to Marion, Ohio.

== Death ==
Morey died in Marion, Ohio in 1881.

Legal offices
Preceded by Daniel LeRoy	Michigan Attorney General; 1837–1841	Succeeded by Zephaniah Platt
