= List of people who have held constitutional office in all three branches of the United States federal government =

John Marshall was the first person to serve in constitutional offices across all three branches.

The following is a list of persons who have held constitutional offices in all three branches of the United States federal government. While it is common for individuals to move between legislative and executive branch offices, service in all three branches is a comparatively rare distinction that has been achieved only a small number of times, and has been recognized as such in historical and biographical studies of the role of American public officials.

Membership in this list is limited to persons who have held offices delineated in the Constitution of the United States and laws enacting the relevant constitutional provisions:

1. Served in the executive branch as president, vice president, or another office requiring confirmation by the United States Senate;
2. Served in the legislative branch as a member of either the U.S. Senate or the U.S. House of Representatives; and
3. Served in the judicial branch as a United States federal judge on a court established under Article Three of the United States Constitution.

== Summary ==
The first person to achieve this distinction was John Marshall. Marshall was confirmed to the Supreme Court in 1801, having briefly served in Congress and as Secretary of State.

The person who most recently achieved service in all three branches was James L. Buckley, who served as a U.S. Senator, in senior Senate-confirmed positions at the U.S. Department of State, and on the District of Columbia Circuit Court of Appeals from 1985 until he assumed senior status in 1996.

The last person still serving with experience in all branches of government was Donald S. Russell, who began his third branch of service in 1966 on the District Court for South Carolina, then moved to the Fourth Circuit Court of Appeals until his death in 1998.

For a majority of listed persons, their judicial appointment was their final branch of service.

Eight people served as a state governor in addition to their federal government service: James F. Byrnes (South Carolina), Salmon P. Chase (Ohio), Mahlon Dickerson (New Jersey), Joe Hickey (Wyoming), John Jay (New York), Thomas B. Robertson (Louisiana), Donald S. Russell (South Carolina), and Levi Woodbury (New Hampshire).

== List ==
Name	Executive	Legislative	Judicial	Party (Note: Parties listed are during their tenure in federal office across the three branches.)
James L. Buckley	U.S. Under Secretary of State for International Security Affairs (1981–1982); Counselor of the U.S. Department of State (1982)	U.S. Senator from New York (1971–1977)	Judge of the U.S. Court of Appeals for the D.C. Circuit (1985–1996)	Republican
James F. Byrnes	Director of the Office of Economic Stabilization (1942–1943); Director of the Office of War Mobilization (1943–1945); U.S. Secretary of State (1945–1947)	U.S. Representative from South Carolina (1911–1925); U.S. Senator from South Carolina (1931–1941)	Associate Justice of the U.S. Supreme Court (1941–1942)	Democratic
Salmon P. Chase	U.S. Secretary of the Treasury (1861–1864)	U.S. Senator from Ohio (1849–1855 and 1861)	Chief Justice of the United States (1864–1873)	Free Soil (before 1854)
Salmon P. Chase	U.S. Secretary of the Treasury (1861–1864)	U.S. Senator from Ohio (1849–1855 and 1861)	Chief Justice of the United States (1864–1873)	Republican (1854–1868)
Salmon P. Chase	U.S. Secretary of the Treasury (1861–1864)	U.S. Senator from Ohio (1849–1855 and 1861)	Chief Justice of the United States (1864–1873)	Democratic (1868–1872)
Salmon P. Chase	U.S. Secretary of the Treasury (1861–1864)	U.S. Senator from Ohio (1849–1855 and 1861)	Chief Justice of the United States (1864–1873)	Liberal Republican (1872–1873)
Henry D. Clayton Jr.	U.S. Attorney for the Middle District of Alabama (1893–1896)	U.S. Representative from Alabama (1897–1914)	Judge of the U.S. District Court for the Northern District of Alabama and the U.S. District Court for the Middle District of Alabama (1914–1929)	Democratic
Nathan Clifford	U.S. Attorney General (1846–1848); U.S. Minister to Mexico (1848–1849)	U.S. Representative from Maine (1839–1843)	Associate Justice of the U.S. Supreme Court (1858–1881)	Democratic
Alfred Conkling	U.S. Minister to Mexico (1852–1853)	U.S. Representative from New York (1821–1823)	Judge of the U.S. District Court for the Northern District of New York (1825–1852)	Democratic-Republican (before 1833)
Alfred Conkling	U.S. Minister to Mexico (1852–1853)	U.S. Representative from New York (1821–1823)	Judge of the U.S. District Court for the Northern District of New York (1825–1852)	Whig (1833–1874)
J. Harry Covington	Member of the Railway Wage Commission (1918–1920)	U.S. Representative from Maryland (1909–1914)	Judge of the Supreme Court of the District of Columbia (1914–1918)	Democratic
Mahlon Dickerson	U.S. Secretary of the Navy (1834–1838)	U.S. Senator from New Jersey (1817–1833)	Judge of the U.S. District Court for the District of New Jersey (1840–1841)	Democratic-Republican (before 1828)
Mahlon Dickerson	U.S. Secretary of the Navy (1834–1838)	U.S. Senator from New Jersey (1817–1833)	Judge of the U.S. District Court for the District of New Jersey (1840–1841)	Democratic (1828–1853)
Edward C. Eicher	Member of the Securities and Exchange Commission (1938–1942)	U.S. Representative from Iowa (1933–1938)	Chief Justice of the U.S. District Court for the District of Columbia (1942–1944)	Democratic
Gabriel Duvall	First Comptroller of the Treasury (1802–1811)	U.S. Representative from Maryland (1794–1796)	Associate Justice of the U.S. Supreme Court (1811–1835)	Democratic-Republican
Powhatan Ellis	U.S. Minister to Mexico (1839–1842)	U.S. Senator from Mississippi (1825–1826 and 1827–1832)	Judge of the U.S. District Court for the District of Mississippi (1832–1836)	Democratic
Walter Evans	Commissioner of Internal Revenue (1883–1885)	U.S. Representative from Kentucky (1895–1899)	Judge of the U.S. District Court for the District of Kentucky (1899–1901); Judge of the U.S. District Court for the Western District of Kentucky (1901–1923)	Republican
George P. Fisher	U.S. Attorney for the District of Columbia (1870–1875); First Auditor of the Treasury Department (1889–1893)	U.S. Representative from Delaware (1861–1863)	Judge of the District of Columbia Supreme Court (1863–1870)	Unionist
Nathan Goff Jr.	U.S. Attorney for the District of West Virginia (1868–1881 and 1881–1882); U.S. Secretary of the Navy (1881)	U.S. Representative from West Virginia (1883–1889); U.S. Senator from West Virginia (1913–1919)	Judge of the U.S. Court of Appeals for the Fourth Circuit (1892–1913)	Republican
Nathan K. Hall	U.S. Postmaster General (1850–1852)	U.S. Representative from New York (1847–1849)	Judge of the U.S. District Court for the Northern District of New York (1852–1874)	Whig
Guy T. Helvering	Commissioner of Internal Revenue (1933–1944)	U.S. Representative from Kansas (1913–1919)	Judge of the U.S. District Court for the District of Kansas (1943–1946)	Democratic
Joe Hickey	U.S. Attorney for the District of Wyoming (1949–1953)	U.S. Senator from Wyoming (1961–1962)	Judge of the U.S. Court of Appeals for the Tenth Circuit (1966–1970)	Democratic
John Jay (Note: Jay's roles as Delegate to the Continental Congress, Minister to Spain, and Foreign Secretary all precede the Constitution.)	U.S. Minister to Spain (1779–1782); U.S. Secretary of Foreign Affairs (1784–1789)	Delegate to the Continental Congress (1774, 1775–1776, and 1778–1779)	Chief Justice of the United States (1789–1795)	Federalist
John Marvin Jones	Administrator of the War Food Administration (1943–1945)	U.S. Representative from Texas (1917–1940)	Judge of the U.S. Court of Claims (1940–1964) (Note: The Court of Claims was an Article I court under the Executive Branch that was elevated to an Article III court under the Judicial Branch in 1953.)	Democratic
David M. Key	U.S. Postmaster General (1877–1880)	U.S. Senator from Tennessee (1875–1877)	Judge of the U.S. District Court for the Eastern District of Tennessee and the U.S. District Court for the Middle District of Tennessee (1880–1895)	Democratic
Lucius Lamar II	U.S. Secretary of the Interior (1885–1888)	U.S. Representative from Mississippi (1857–1860 and 1873–1877); U.S. Senator from Mississippi (1877–1885)	Associate Justice of the U.S. Supreme Court (1888–1893)	Democratic
John Laurance	U.S. Army Judge Advocate General (1777–1782)	U.S. Representative from New York (1789–1793); U.S. Senator from New York (1796–1800)	Judge of the U.S. District Court for the District of New York (1794–1796)	Federalist
Oscar Raymond Luhring	U.S. Assistant Attorney General for the Criminal Division (1925–1930)	U.S. Representative from Indiana (1919–1923)	Judge of the U.S. District Court for the District of Columbia (1930–1944)	Republican
George MacKinnon	U.S. Attorney for the District of Minnesota (1953–1958)	U.S. Representative from Minnesota (1947–1949)	Judge of the U.S. District Court for the D.C. Circuit (1969–1995)	Republican
John Marshall	U.S. Secretary of State (1800–1801)	U.S. Representative from Virginia (1799–1800)	Chief Justice of the United States (1801–1835)	Federalist
John Y. Mason	U.S. Attorney General (1845–1846); U.S. Secretary of the Navy (1844–1845 and 1846–1849)	U.S. Representative from Virginia (1831–1837)	Judge of the U.S. District Court for the Eastern District of Virginia (1841–1844)	Democratic
Stanley Matthews	U.S. Attorney for the Southern District of Ohio (1858–1861)	U.S. Senator from Ohio (1877–1881)	Associate Justice of the U.S. Supreme Court (1881–1889)	Republican
George W. McCrary	U.S. Secretary of War (1877–1879)	U.S. Representative from Iowa (1869–1877)	Judge of the U.S. Circuit Court for the Eighth Circuit (1879–1884)	Republican
James P. McGranery	U.S. Attorney General (1952–1953)	U.S. Representative from Pennsylvania (1937–1943)	Judge of the U.S. District Court for the Eastern District of Pennsylvania (1946–1952)	Democratic
Joseph McKenna	U.S. Attorney General (1897–1898)	U.S. Representative from California (1885–1892)	Judge of the U.S. Court of Appeals for the Ninth Circuit (1892–1897); Associate Justice of the U.S. Supreme Court (1898–1925)	Republican
Charles F. McLaughlin	Member of the American-Mexican Claims Commission (1943–1947); Member of the Indian Claims Commission (1947–1949)	U.S. Representative from Nebraska (1935–1943)	Judge of the U.S. District Court for the District of Columbia (1949–1964)	Democratic
John McLean	U.S. Postmaster General (1823–1829)	U.S. Representative from Ohio (1813–1816)	Associate Justice of the U.S. Supreme Court (1829–1861)	Multiple over time
George J. Mitchell	U.S. Attorney for the District of Maine (1977–1979)	U.S. Senator from Maine (1980–1995)	Judge of the U.S. District Court for the District of Maine (1979–1980)	Democratic
William Henry Moody	U.S. Attorney for the District of Massachusetts (1890–1895); U.S. Attorney General (1904–1906); U.S. Secretary of the Navy (1902–1904)	U.S. Representative from Massachusetts (1895–1902)	Associate Justice of the U.S. Supreme Court (1906–1910)	Republican
John Paul Jr.	U.S. Attorney for the Western District of Virginia (1929–1932)	U.S. Representative from Virginia (1922–1923)	Judge of the U.S. District Court for the Western District of Virginia (1932–1964)	Republican
Ross Rizley	Assistant Secretary of Agriculture for Congressional Relations (1953–1954); Chair of the Civil Aeronautics Board (1955–1956)	U.S. Representative from Oklahoma (1941–1949)	Judge of the U.S. District Court for the Western District of Oklahoma (1956–1969)	Republican
Thomas B. Robertson	Secretary of the Territory of Orleans (1807–1812)	U.S. Representative from Louisiana (1812–1818)	Judge of the U.S. District Court for the Western District of Louisiana and U.S. District Court for the Eastern District of Louisiana (1824–1828)	Democratic-Republican
Donald S. Russell	Assistant Secretary of State for Administration (1945–1947)	U.S. Senator from South Carolina (1965–1966)	Judge of the U.S. District Court for the District of South Carolina (1966–1971); Judge of the U.S. Court of Appeals for the Fourth Circuit (1971–1998)	Democratic
Lewis B. Schwellenbach	U.S. Secretary of Labor (1945–1948)	U.S. Senator from Washington (1934–1940)	Judge of the U.S. District Court for the Eastern District of Washington (1940–1945)	Democratic
John Samuel Sherburne	U.S. Attorney for the District of New Hampshire (1789–1793 and 1801–1804)	U.S. Representative from New Hampshire (1793–1797)	Judge of the U.S. District Court for the District of New Hampshire (1804–1830)	Democratic-Republican
Caleb Blood Smith	U.S. Secretary of the Interior (1861–1862)	U.S. Representative from Indiana (1843–1849)	Judge of the U.S. District Court for the District of Indiana (1862–1864)	Whig (before 1854)
Caleb Blood Smith	U.S. Secretary of the Interior (1861–1862)	U.S. Representative from Indiana (1843–1849)	Judge of the U.S. District Court for the District of Indiana (1862–1864)	Republican (1854–1864)
Emory Speer	U.S. Attorney for the Northern District of Georgia (1883–1885)	U.S. Representative from Georgia (1878–1882)	Judge of the U.S. District Court for the Southern District of Georgia (1885–1918)	Democratic
Fred M. Vinson	Director of the Office of Economic Stabilization (1943–1945); U.S. Secretary of the Treasury (1945–1946)	U.S. Representative from Kentucky (1924–1929 and 1931–1938)	Judge of the U.S. Court of Appeals for the D.C. Circuit (1938–1943); Chief Justice of the United States (1946–1953)	Democratic
Edmund Waddill Jr.	U.S. Attorney for the Eastern District of Virginia (1883–1885)	U.S. Representative from Virginia (1890–1891)	Judge of the U.S. District Court for the Eastern District of Virginia (1898–1921); Judge of the U.S. Court of Appeals for the Fourth Circuit (1921–1931)	Republican
William Wilkins	U.S. Secretary of War (1844–1845)	U.S. Senator from Pennsylvania (1831–1834); U.S. Representative from Pennsylvania (1843–1844)	Judge of the U.S. District Court for the Western District of Pennsylvania (1824–1831)	Democratic
James Clifton Wilson	U.S. Attorney for the Northern District of Texas (1913–1917)	U.S. Representative from Texas (1917–1919)	Judge of the U.S. District Court for the Northern District of Texas (1919–1951)	Democratic
Levi Woodbury	U.S. Secretary of the Navy (1831–1834); U.S. Secretary of the Treasury (1834–1841)	U.S. Senator from New Hampshire (1825–1831 and 1841–1845)	Associate Justice of the U.S. Supreme Court (1845–1851)	Democratic

== Near misses ==
A number of people have come close to achieving this distinction. Included below are those who:

- Held constitutional offices in two branches, but failed in an attempt to obtain a constitutional office in a third branch;
- Held constitutional offices in two branches, and served in a non-constitutional office in a third branch; or
- Held constitutional offices in two branches, and served in a comparable state level office in a third branch.

Name	Executive	Legislative	Judicial	Party
John Quincy Adams	U.S. Secretary of State (1817–1825); President of the United States (1825–1829)	U.S. Senator from Massachusetts (1803–1808); U.S. Representative from Massachusetts (1831–1848)	Confirmed as Associate Justice of the U.S. Supreme Court (1811), but declined the appointment.	Democratic-Republican
George W. Atkinson	U.S. Marshal for the District of West Virginia (1881–1885); U.S. Attorney for the Southern District of West Virginia (1901–1905)	U.S. Representative from West Virginia (1890–1891)	Served as Judge of the U.S. Court of Claims (1905–1916), which was an Article I court under the Executive Branch, and did not become an Article III court under the Judicial Branch until 1953.	Republican
George Edmund Badger	U.S. Secretary of the Navy (1841)	U.S. Senator from North Carolina (1846–1855)	Unsuccessfully nominated as Associate Justice of the U.S. Supreme Court (1853).	Whig
Guy K. Bard	U.S. Attorney for the Eastern District of Pennsylvania (1937)	Unsuccessfully nominated for U.S. Senator from Pennsylvania (1952).	Judge of the U.S. District Court for the Eastern District of Pennsylvania (1939–1952)	Democratic
Ed Bryant	U.S. Attorney for the Western District of Tennessee (1991–1993)	U.S. Representative from Tennessee (1995–2003)	Served as Magistrate Judge for the U.S. District Court for the Western District of Tennessee (2008–2019).	Republican
Frank M. Coffin	Held three Executive Branch positions—Managing Director of the Development Loan Fund (1961), Deputy Administrator of the U.S. Agency for International Development (1961–1964), and U.S. Representative to the OECD Development Assistance Committee (1964–1965)—but none required Senate confirmation.	U.S. Representative from Maine (1957–1961)	Judge of the U.S. Court of Appeals for the First Circuit (1965–1989)	Democratic
John J. Crittenden	U.S. Attorney General (1841 and 1850–1853)	U.S. Senator from Kentucky (1817–1819, 1835–1841, 1842–1848, and 1855–1861); U.S. Representative from Kentucky (1861–1863)	Unsuccessfully nominated as Associate Justice of the U.S. Supreme Court (1828).	Democratic-Republican (before 1825)
John J. Crittenden	U.S. Attorney General (1841 and 1850–1853)	U.S. Senator from Kentucky (1817–1819, 1835–1841, 1842–1848, and 1855–1861); U.S. Representative from Kentucky (1861–1863)	Unsuccessfully nominated as Associate Justice of the U.S. Supreme Court (1828).	National Republican (1825–1830)
John J. Crittenden	U.S. Attorney General (1841 and 1850–1853)	U.S. Senator from Kentucky (1817–1819, 1835–1841, 1842–1848, and 1855–1861); U.S. Representative from Kentucky (1861–1863)	Unsuccessfully nominated as Associate Justice of the U.S. Supreme Court (1828).	Whig (1830–1856)
John J. Crittenden	U.S. Attorney General (1841 and 1850–1853)	U.S. Senator from Kentucky (1817–1819, 1835–1841, 1842–1848, and 1855–1861); U.S. Representative from Kentucky (1861–1863)	Unsuccessfully nominated as Associate Justice of the U.S. Supreme Court (1828).	Know Nothing (1856–1859)
John J. Crittenden	U.S. Attorney General (1841 and 1850–1853)	U.S. Senator from Kentucky (1817–1819, 1835–1841, 1842–1848, and 1855–1861); U.S. Representative from Kentucky (1861–1863)	Unsuccessfully nominated as Associate Justice of the U.S. Supreme Court (1828).	Unionist (1859–1863)
Caleb Cushing	U.S. Minister to China (1844); U.S. Attorney General (1853–1857); U.S. Minister to Spain (1874–1877)	U.S. Representative from Massachusetts (1835–1843)	Unsuccessfully nominated as Chief Justice of the United States (1874) and served as Associate Justice of the Massachusetts Supreme Judicial Court (1852–1853) at the state level.	Whig (before 1847)
Caleb Cushing	U.S. Minister to China (1844); U.S. Attorney General (1853–1857); U.S. Minister to Spain (1874–1877)	U.S. Representative from Massachusetts (1835–1843)	Unsuccessfully nominated as Chief Justice of the United States (1874) and served as Associate Justice of the Massachusetts Supreme Judicial Court (1852–1853) at the state level.	Democratic (1847–1879)
David Davis	Never appointed to the Executive Branch, but served as Abraham Lincoln's campaign manager (1860) and later as an administrator of Lincoln's estate after his assassination.	U.S. Senator from Illinois (1877–1883)	Associate Justice of the U.S. Supreme Court (1862–1877)	Republican (before 1870)
David Davis	Never appointed to the Executive Branch, but served as Abraham Lincoln's campaign manager (1860) and later as an administrator of Lincoln's estate after his assassination.	U.S. Senator from Illinois (1877–1883)	Associate Justice of the U.S. Supreme Court (1862–1877)	Liberal Republican (1870–1872)
David Davis	Never appointed to the Executive Branch, but served as Abraham Lincoln's campaign manager (1860) and later as an administrator of Lincoln's estate after his assassination.	U.S. Senator from Illinois (1877–1883)	Associate Justice of the U.S. Supreme Court (1862–1877)	Independent (1872–1886)
Oliver Ellsworth	Unsuccessful candidate for President of the United States (1796). Also served as an Envoy Extraordinary to France (1799–1800), an unofficial position under the Executive Branch.	U.S. Representative from Connecticut (1789–1796)	Chief Justice of the United States (1796–1800)	Federalist
Walter Q. Gresham	U.S. Postmaster General (1883–1884); U.S. Secretary of the Treasury (1884); U.S. Secretary of State (1893–1895)	Served in the Indiana House of Representatives (1860–1861) at the state level.	Judge of the U.S. District Court for the District of Indiana (1869–1883); Judge of the U.S. Court of Appeals for the Seventh Circuit (1884–1893)	Republican (before 1892)
Walter Q. Gresham	U.S. Postmaster General (1883–1884); U.S. Secretary of the Treasury (1884); U.S. Secretary of State (1893–1895)	Served in the Indiana House of Representatives (1860–1861) at the state level.	Judge of the U.S. District Court for the District of Indiana (1869–1883); Judge of the U.S. Court of Appeals for the Seventh Circuit (1884–1893)	Democratic (1892–1895)
Ebenezer R. Hoar	U.S. Attorney General (1869–1870)	U.S. Representative from Massachusetts (1873–1875)	Unsuccessfully nominated as Associate Justice of the U.S. Supreme Court (1869).	Republican
Andrew Jackson	President of the United States (1829–1837)	U.S. Representative from Tennessee (1796–1797); U.S. Senator from Tennessee (1797–1798 and 1823–1825)	Served as Judge-Advocate of the Tennessee Militia and Justice of the Tennessee Superior Court (1798–1804) at the state level.	Democratic-Republican (before 1825)
Andrew Jackson	President of the United States (1829–1837)	U.S. Representative from Tennessee (1796–1797); U.S. Senator from Tennessee (1797–1798 and 1823–1825)	Served as Judge-Advocate of the Tennessee Militia and Justice of the Tennessee Superior Court (1798–1804) at the state level.	Democratic (1825–1845)
John J. Jenkins	U.S. Attorney for the District of Wyoming Territory (1876–1880)	U.S. Representative from Wisconsin (1895–1909)	Served as Judge of the U.S. District Court for Puerto Rico (1910–1911), which was an Article IV court and did not become an Article III court under the Judicial Branch until 1966.	Republican
William Lewis	U.S. Attorney for Pennsylvania (1789–1791)	Served in the Pennsylvania House of Representatives (1787–1789) at the state level.	Judge of the U.S. District Court for the District of Pennsylvania (1791–1792)	Federalist
Levi Lincoln Sr.	U.S. Attorney General (1801–1805)	U.S. Representative from Massachusetts (1800–1801)	Confirmed as Associate Justice of the U.S. Supreme Court (1811), but declined.	Democratic-Republican
Abner Mikva	Served as White House Counsel (1994–1995), which did not require Senate confirmation.	U.S. Representative from Illinois (1969–1973 and 1975–1979)	Judge of the U.S. Court of Appeals for the D.C. Circuit (1979–1994)	Democratic
Sherman Minton	Served as an advisor to President Franklin D. Roosevelt, but held no official office in the Executive Branch.	U.S. Senator from Indiana (1935–1941)	Judge of the U.S. Court of Appeals for the Seventh Circuit (1941–1949); Associate Justice of the U.S. Supreme Court (1949–1956)	Democratic
William W. Morrow	Served as Special U.S. Attorney for the French and American Claims Commission (1881–1883) and Special U.S. Attorney for the Alabama Claims Commission (1882–1885), which did not require Senate confirmation.	U.S. Representative from California (1885–1891)	Judge of the U.S. District Court for the Northern District of California (1891–1897); Judge of the U.S. Court of Appeals for the Ninth Circuit (1897–1923)	Republican
John Pettit	U.S. Attorney for the District of Indiana (1839–1841)	U.S. Representative from Indiana (1843–1849); U.S. Senator from Indiana (1853–1855)	Served as Chief Justice of the Kansas Territory Supreme Court (1859–1961), which was an Article IV court, and Justice of the Indiana Supreme Court (1870–1877) at the state level.	Democratic
Nathaniel Pope	Secretary of the Illinois Territory (1809–1816)	Served as a non-voting U.S. Delegate from the Illinois Territory (1816–1818), which is not constitutionally recognized as a full member of the House.	Judge of the U.S. District Court for the District of Illinois (1819–1850)	Democratic-Republican
James E. Rogan	Under Secretary of Commerce for Intellectual Property and Director of the United States Patent and Trademark Office (2001–2004)	U.S. Representative from California (1997–2001)	Unsuccessfully nominated as Judge of the U.S. District Court for the Central District of California (2007). Later served as Judge of the California Superior Court for Orange County (2006–present) at the state level.	Republican
Jeff Sessions	U.S. Attorney General (2017–2018); U.S. Attorney for the Southern District of Alabama (1981–1993)	U.S. Senator from Alabama (1997–2017)	Unsuccessfully nominated as Judge of the U.S. District Court for the Southern District of Alabama (1986).	Republican
John Spencer	U.S. Secretary of War (1841–1843); U.S. Secretary of the Treasury (1843–1844)	U.S. Representative from New York (1817–1819)	Unsuccessfully nominated as Associate Justice of the U.S. Supreme Court (1844).	Democratic-Republican (before 1825)
John Spencer	U.S. Secretary of War (1841–1843); U.S. Secretary of the Treasury (1843–1844)	U.S. Representative from New York (1817–1819)	Unsuccessfully nominated as Associate Justice of the U.S. Supreme Court (1844).	National Republican (1825–1828)
John Spencer	U.S. Secretary of War (1841–1843); U.S. Secretary of the Treasury (1843–1844)	U.S. Representative from New York (1817–1819)	Unsuccessfully nominated as Associate Justice of the U.S. Supreme Court (1844).	Anti-Masonic (1828–1834)
John Spencer	U.S. Secretary of War (1841–1843); U.S. Secretary of the Treasury (1843–1844)	U.S. Representative from New York (1817–1819)	Unsuccessfully nominated as Associate Justice of the U.S. Supreme Court (1844).	Whig (1834–1855)
Horace W. Vaughan	U.S. Attorney for the District of Hawaii Territory (1915–1916)	U.S. Representative from Texas (1913–1915)	Served as Judge of the U.S. District Court for Hawaii Territory (1916–1922), which was an Article IV court and did not become an Article III court under the Judicial Branch until 1959.	Democratic
George Henry Williams	U.S. Attorney General (1871–1875)	U.S. Senator from Oregon (1865–1871)	Served as Chief Justice of the Oregon Territory Supreme Court (1853–1858), which was an Article IV court, and was unsuccessfully nominated for Chief Justice of the United States (1873).	Republican

== See also ==
- List of people who have served in all three branches of a U.S. state government
- List of people who have held multiple United States Cabinet-level positions
- List of U.S. Supreme Court justices who also served in the U.S. Congress
