= Otto Kirchner (politician) =

American politician (1846–1920)

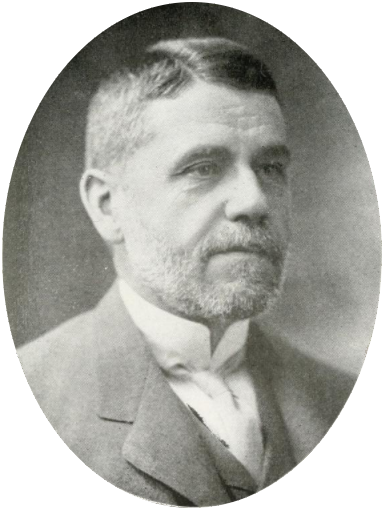

Michigan Attorney General
- In office 1877–1880
- Governor: Charles Croswell
- Preceded by: Andrew J. Smith
- Succeeded by: Jacob J. Van Riper

Personal details
- Born: July 13, 1846 Frankfurt (Oder), Kingdom of Prussia
- Died: July 21, 1920 (aged 74) Detroit, Michigan, US
- Party: Republican

Otto Kirchner (July 13, 1846 – July 21, 1920) was a Michigan politician.

== Early life ==
Kirchner was born on July 13, 1846, in the Kingdom of Prussia. Kirchner emigrated from Germany to the United States in 1853.

== Career ==
In the United States, Kirchner studied law, was admitted to the Michigan Bar, and started practicing law in Detroit. Kirchner was an alternate delegate to Republican National Convention from Michigan in 1876. Kirchner served as Michigan Attorney General from 1877 to 1880. From 1885 to 1886, Kircher worked as a Kent Professor of Law at the University of Michigan. Kirchner worked as a professor of law at the University of Michigan from 1885 to 1906. Kirchner was conferred an honorary degree of Master of Arts by the University of Michigan in 1894.

== Death ==
Kirchner died on July 21, 1920, in his home in Detroit, Michigan.

Legal offices
Preceded by Andrew J. Smith	Michigan Attorney General; 1877–1880	Succeeded by Jacob J. Van Riper
