= Clare Retan =

American politician

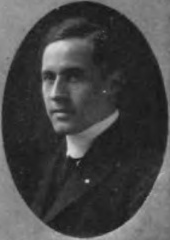

Michigan Attorney General
- In office October 1926 – December 1926
- Governor: Alex J. Groesbeck
- Preceded by: Andrew B. Dougherty
- Succeeded by: William W. Potter

Personal details
- Born: June 8, 1888 Hudson, Michigan, US
- Died: July 1, 1931 (aged 43) Windsor, Ontario, Canada
- Party: Republican
- Spouse: Ferne Inez Listeman
- Education: University of Michigan Law School

Clare Arthur Retan (June 8, 1888 – July 1, 1931) was a Michigan lawyer.

== Early life ==
Retan was born on June 8, 1888, in Hudson, Michigan, to parents Frank Arthur and Florence Agnes Retan.

== Education ==
Retan graduated from the University of Michigan Law School.

== Career ==
Retan, after his graduation, began to practice law. In October 1926, Retan was appointed to the position of Michigan Attorney General by Governor Alex J. Groesbeck, where he served for the rest of the year.

== Personal life ==
Reten married Ferne Inez Listeman in 1923.

== Death ==
Retan died on July 1, 1931, in Windsor, Ontario, Canada.

Legal offices
Preceded by Andrew B. Dougherty	Michigan Attorney General; 1926–1926	Succeeded by William W. Potter
