= State governments of the United States =

Constituent governments of the United States

In the United States, state governments are institutional units exercising functions of government within the country’s federal system, alongside the federal government. Each U.S. state's government holds legislative, executive, and judicial authority over a defined geographic territory. The United States comprises 50 states: 9 of the Thirteen Colonies that were already part of the United States at the time the Constitution took effect in 1789, 4 that ratified the Constitution after its commencement, plus 37 that have been admitted since by Congress as authorized under Article IV, Section 3 of the Constitution.

== Legal status ==
While each of the state governments within the United States holds legal and administrative jurisdiction within its bounds, they are not sovereign in the Westphalian sense in international law which says that each state has sovereignty over its territory and domestic affairs, to the exclusion of all external powers, on the principle of non-interference in another state's domestic affairs, and that each state (no matter how large or small) is equal in international law. Additionally, the member states of the United States do not possess international legal sovereignty, meaning that they are not recognized by other sovereign states such as, for example, France, Germany or the United Kingdom, nor do they possess full interdependence sovereignty (a term popularized by international relations professor Stephen D. Krasner), meaning that they cannot control movement of persons across state borders.

This form of limited sovereignty (commonly called "dual sovereignty" or "separate sovereigns" in the language of constitutional law) is derived from the 10th Amendment to the Constitution, which states that "the powers not delegated to the United States by the Constitution, nor prohibited by it to the States, are reserved to the States respectively, or to the people." Structured in accordance with state law (including state constitutions and state statutes), and although not a requirement, all state governments currently share the same structural model as the federal system, with three branches of government—executive, legislative, and judicial.

The governments of the 13 states that formed the original Union under the Constitution trace their roots back to the colonial governments of the Thirteen Colonies. Most of the states admitted to the Union after the original 13 have been formed from organized territories established and governed by Congress in accord with its plenary power under Article IV, Section 3, Clause 2 of the Constitution.

Six subsequent states were never an organized territory of the federal government, or part of one, before being admitted to the Union. Three were set off from an already existing state: Kentucky (1792, from Virginia), Maine (1820, from Massachusetts), and West Virginia (1863, from Virginia). Two were sovereign states at the time of their admission: Texas (1845, previously the Republic of Texas), and Vermont (1791, previously the de facto but unrecognized Vermont Republic). One was established from unorganized territory: California (1850, from land ceded to the United States by Mexico in 1848 under the terms of the Treaty of Guadalupe Hidalgo).

== Legislatures ==
The legislative branch of each state consists of a state legislature. Every state except for Nebraska has a bicameral legislature, meaning it comprises two chambers.

The unicameral Nebraska Legislature is commonly called the "Senate," and its members are officially called "Senators."

In the majority of states (26), the state legislature is simply called "Legislature." Another 19 states call their legislature "General Assembly." Two states (Oregon and North Dakota) use the term "Legislative Assembly," while another two (Massachusetts and New Hampshire) use the term "General Court."

=== Upper houses ===
In the 49 bicameral legislatures, the upper house is called the "Senate."

Until 1964, state senators were generally elected from districts that were not necessarily equal in population. In some cases state senate districts were based partly on county lines. In the vast majority of states, the Senate districts provided proportionately greater representation to rural areas. However, in the 1964 decision Reynolds v. Sims, the U.S. Supreme Court ruled that, unlike the United States Senate, state senates must be elected from districts of approximately equal population.

=== Lower houses ===
In 40 of the 49 bicameral state legislatures, the lower house is called the "House of Representatives." The name "House of Delegates" is only used in Maryland, Virginia, and West Virginia. California and Wisconsin call their lower house the "State Assembly," while Nevada and New York simply call the lower house the "Assembly." New Jersey calls its lower house the "General Assembly."

== Executive ==
The executive branch of every state is led by an elected governor. Most states have a plural executive, in which several key members of the executive branch are directly elected by the people and serve alongside the governor. These include the offices of lieutenant governor (often on a joint ticket with the governor) and attorney general, secretary of state, auditors (or comptrollers or controllers), treasurer, commissioners of agriculture, commissioner or superintendent of education, and commissioner of insurance.

Each state government is free to organize its executive departments and agencies in any way it likes. This has resulted in substantial diversity among the states with regard to every aspect of how their governments are organized.

Most state governments traditionally use the department as the standard highest-level component of the executive branch, in that the secretary of a department is normally considered to be a member of the governor's cabinet and serves as the main interface between the governor and all agencies in their assigned portfolio. A department in turn usually consists of several divisions, offices, and/or agencies. A state government may also include various boards, commissions, councils, corporations, offices, or authorities, which may either be subordinate to an existing department or division, or independent altogether.

== Judiciary ==
The judicial branch in most states has a court of last resort usually called a Supreme Court that hears appeals from lower state courts. New York's highest court is called the Court of Appeals, while its trial court is known as the Supreme Court. Maryland's highest court was called the Maryland Court of Appeals until 2022 when it was renamed the Supreme Court of Maryland. Texas and Oklahoma each have separate courts of last resort for civil and criminal appeals. Each state's court of last resort has the last word on issues of state law and can be overruled only on issues of federal law by the U.S. Supreme Court.

The structure of courts and the methods of selecting judges is determined by each state's constitution or legislature. Most states have at least one trial-level court and an intermediate appeals court from which only some cases are appealed to the highest court.

Delaware has a unique equity court called the Court of Chancery.

== Common government components ==
Although the exact position of each component may vary, there are certain components common to most state governments:

- Office of the Governor
- Office of the Lieutenant Governor
- Office of the State Attorney General
- Agriculture
- Arts council
- Banking/Financial institutions
- Civil service
- Consumer protection
- Corrections and parole supervision
- Economic development
- Education
- Emergency management
- Energy
- Environment
- Fire protection
- Health care
- Highway patrol
- Homeland security
- Housing
- Insurance
- Justice
- Labor
- Law revision
- Lottery
- Motor vehicles
- Military/Adjutant general
- Occupational safety and health
- Pensions (for public employees)
- Public health
- Secretary of State
- State parks
- State police
- State university system
- Transportation
- Treasury
- Unemployment insurance
- Veterans' affairs
- Workers' compensation

=== Education ===
Education is one of the largest areas of spending by state governments. This includes K–12 education (primary and secondary schools) as well as state university systems.

=== Health care ===
Health care is one of the largest areas of spending by state governments. This includes spending on Medicaid and the Children's Health Insurance Program.

== See also ==
- Article Four of the United States Constitution – Portion of the US Constitution regarding states
- Federal government of the United States
- List of people who have served in all three branches of a U.S. state government
- Local government in the United States – Governmental jurisdictions below the level of the state
- Political divisions of the United States
- Seals of the U.S. states
