= Henry McFadden =

American farmer and politician (1798–1875)

Henry McFadden (August 25, 1798 – June 10, 1875) was an American farmer and politician from Beekmantown, New York.

== Life ==
McFadden was born on August 25, 1798, in Argyle, New York, the son of Irish immigrant George McFadden.

McFadden moved to Beekmantown with his parents in 1802. He then moved to Chazy with his parents in 1815. In 1824, he returned to Beekmantown and lived there for the rest of his life. A successful farmer, he owned 240 acres of land at one point. He held nearly all the local offices in town. Originally a Democrat, he became a Republican in 1856.

In 1859, McFadden was elected to the New York State Assembly as a Republican, representing Clinton County. He served in the Assembly in 1860 and 1861. In the Assembly he was on the Standing Committee on State Prisons. He was a firm Abolitionist.

McFadden was an Elder of the Presbyterian Church and a delegate to the 1869 General Assembly. In 1824, he married Phebe Wood of Chazy. They had three surviving children: Esther M. (a teacher and wife of Beekmantown farmer John S. Kirby), Gustavus (a physician in Wilson County, Kansas), and Amelia A. (a teacher at the Potsdam Normal School.

McFadden died on June 10, 1875.

New York State Assembly
Preceded by Lewis W. Pierce	New York State Assembly; Clinton County; 1860–1861	Succeeded by Lemuel Stetson
