= Zephania =

Zephania is a given name. Notable people with the name include:

- Zephania Arinaitwe (born 2001), Ugandan cricketer
- Zephania Kameeta (born 1945), Namibian religious leader
- Zephania Mothopeng (1913–1990), South African activist

== See also ==
- Zephaniah (disambiguation)
