= Merlin Wiley =

American politician

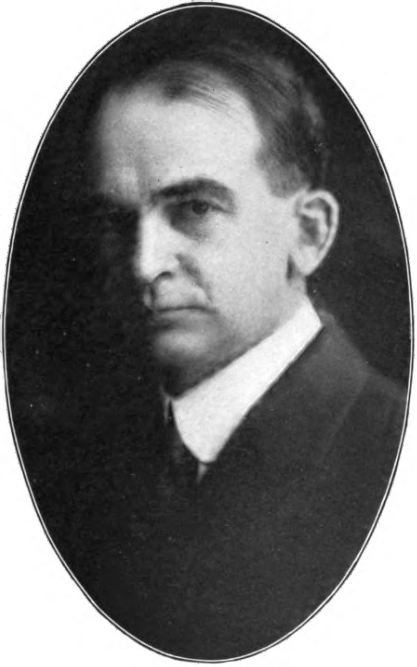

Michigan Attorney General
- In office 1921–1923
- Preceded by: Alex J. Groesbeck
- Succeeded by: Andrew B. Dougherty

Member of the Michigan House of Representatives from the Chippewa County district
- In office January 1, 1915 – 1920

Personal details
- Born: May 7, 1875 Shepherd, Michigan, US
- Died: April 24, 1963 (aged 87) Ann Arbor, Michigan, US
- Party: Republican
- Spouse: Helen Seymour
- Children: 2
- Education: University of Michigan

Merlin Wiley (May 7, 1875 – April 24, 1963) was a Michigan politician.

== Early life ==
Wiley was born on May 7, 1875, in Shepherd, Michigan to Edgar James Wiley and Leona Wiley.

== Education ==
Wiley graduated from Sault Ste. Marie High School. Wiley graduated from the University of Michigan twice, once from the Literary Department in 1902 and once from the Law Department in 1904.

== Career ==
Wiley started practicing law in Sault Ste. Marie, Michigan in 1904. Wiley served as Chippewa County prosecuting attorney from 1909 to 1910. On November 3, 1914, Wiley was elected to the Michigan House of Representatives where he represented the Chippewa County district from January 6, 1915, to 1920. Wiley served as Michigan Attorney General from 1921 to 1923. Wiley resigned in 1923.

== Personal life ==
Wiley married Helen Seymour in 1910. Together they had two children. Wiley was a member of the American Bar Association, the Knights Templar, and the Shriners. Wiley was a Freemason.

== Death ==
Wiley died on April 24, 1963, in Ann Arbor, Michigan.

Legal offices
| Preceded by Alex J. Groesbeck | Michigan Attorney General; 1921–1923 | Succeeded by Andrew B. Dougherty |
