= Zephaniah C. Platt =

American farmer, banker, and politician

Zephaniah C. Platt (July 30, 1805 – August 24, 1884) was an American farmer, banker, and politician from Plattsburgh, New York.

== Life ==
Platt was born on July 30, 1805, in Plattsburgh, New York, the son of Isaac C. Platt and Ann Tredwell. His paternal grandfather was Judge Charles Platt, who was the first Supervisor of Plattsburgh, the first Judge of Clinton Common Pleas Court, town and county clerk, and brother of Zephaniah Platt. His maternal grandfather was Thomas Tredwell.

During the War of 1812, Platt was sent to Vermont and studied in the primary department of Middlebury College, which his uncle Henry Davis was president of. He then attended the Plattsburgh Academy. A farmer, he was considered one of the leading agriculturists in the county. He was the first president of the First National Bank of Plattsburgh and the Clinton County Savings Bank. He was prominently involved in the movement to build the New York and Canada Railroad. He was also involved in the insurance business and was a supporter of the Temperance movement.

Platt was Supervisor in 1842 and 1854. In 1857, he was elected to the New York State Assembly as a Democrat, representing Clinton County. He served in the Assembly in 1858. He lost the 1858 re-election to Republican Lewis W. Pierce. In the 1876 United States House of Representatives election, he was the Democratic candidate in New York's 18th congressional district. He lost the election to Republican incumbent Andrew Williams.

Platt was an Elder of the Presbyterian Church. In 1829, he married Ann Elizabeth Miller. Their children were Ann Elizabeth (wife of B. F. Felt of Galena, Illinois), Caroline D. (wife of James Palmer), John D. of Nebraska, and Mary L. His wife died in 1871, and in 1873 he married Julia Haynes.

Platt died at home from apoplexy while walking in the garden with his daughter on August 24, 1884. His funeral was held at his home and at the First Presbyterian Church, with Rev. Joseph Gamble officiating. He was buried with Masonic honors by the Clinton Lodge, which he was the oldest member of. He was buried in Riverside Cemetery in Plattsburgh.

New York State Assembly
Preceded by Morace P. Perry	New York State Assembly; Clinton County; 1858	Succeeded by Lewis W. Pierce
