= Jonas Platt =

American politician (1769–1834)

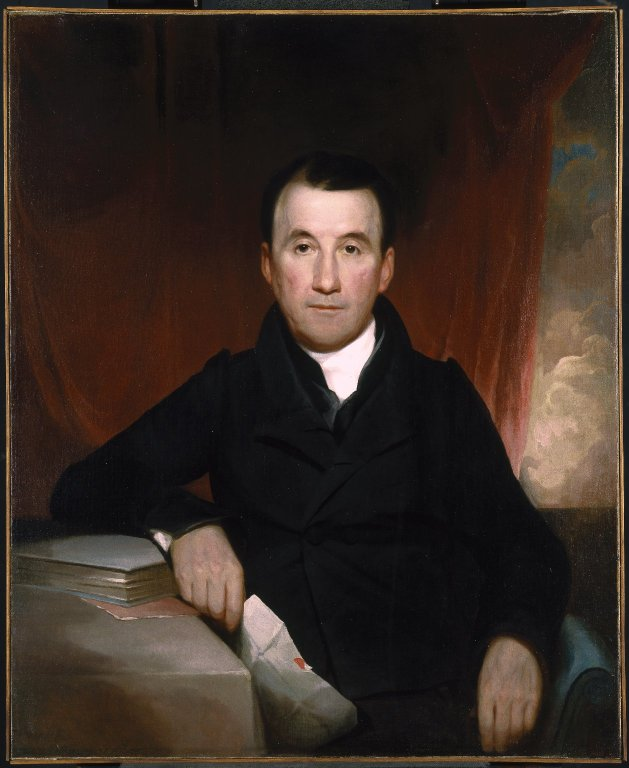
- Portrait of Platt, by Samuel F. B. Morse, 1828

Member of the New York State Senate
- In office July 1, 1809 – June 30, 1813

Member of the U.S. House of Representatives from New York's 9th district
- In office March 4, 1799 – March 3, 1801
- Preceded by: John Williams
- Succeeded by: Benjamin Walker

Member of the New York State Assembly
- In office July 1, 1795 – June 30, 1796

Personal details
- Born: June 30, 1769 Poughkeepsie, Province of New York, British America
- Died: February 22, 1834 (aged 64) Peru, New York, United States
- Party: Federalist
- Spouse: Helena Livingston
- Relations: Charles Z. Platt (brother)
- Children: 8, including Zephaniah
- Parent(s): Zephaniah Platt; Mary Van Wyck Platt

Jonas Platt (June 30, 1769 – February 22, 1834) was an American lawyer and politician from New York. He was a member of the United States House of Representatives.

== Early life ==
Platt was born on June 30, 1769, in Poughkeepsie, Province of New York, in what was then British America. He was the son of patriot politician and lawyer Zephaniah Platt (1735–1807), who founded Plattsburgh, New York, and his second wife, Mary Van Wyck Platt (1742–1809). Among his siblings was New York State Treasurer Charles Z. Platt.

After attending a French Academy at Montreal, Quebec, Platt studied law under Richard Varick in New York City and was admitted to the bar in 1790.

== Career ==
He practiced law in Poughkeepsie and served as the county clerk of Herkimer County, New York, from 1791 to 1798. He was also the county clerk of Oneida County, New York, from 1798 to 1802. He was a member of the New York State Assembly in 1796.

Platt was elected as a Federalist to the 6th United States Congress, and served from March 4, 1799, to March 3, 1801. He was the Chair of the United States House Committee on Revisal and Unfinished Business.

Following his Congressional service, Platt resumed practicing law in New York and concurrently served as a General in the Cavalry in the New York State Militia.

Platt served as a member of the New York State Senate from 1809 to 1813. As a member of the Senate, Platt was an active promoter of the Erie Canal and worked to advance legislation to spur its construction.

In 1810, he was an unsuccessful candidate for governor, and in 1813, served as a member of the Council of Appointment.

From 1814 to 1821, Platt was an associate justice of the New York Supreme Court. He was a delegate to the New York Constitutional Convention in 1821.

== Personal life ==
He married Helena Livingston (1767–1859), the daughter of Dr. Henry Livingston and Susannah Storm (née Conklin) Livingston, of the Livingston family. She was also the sister of Continental Congressman Gilbert Livingston, the Rev. Dr. John Henry Livingston, president of Queen's College, and author Henry Livingston Jr. (the grandfather of U.S. Senator Sidney Breese and Admiral Samuel Livingston Breese), among others. Together, Jonas and Helena were the parents of eight children, including:

- Susan Jonasse Platt (1793–1843), who married Richard Ray Lansing (d. 1855).
- Zephaniah Platt (1796–1871), the Michigan Attorney General.
- Helen Livingston Platt (1798–1876), who married Truman Parmelee (1801–1845). After his death, she married Dr. Henry W. Bell.

Platt died on February 22, 1834, in Peru, Clinton County, New York and was buried at the Riverside Cemetery in Plattsburgh.

Party political offices
Vacant Title last held by Aaron Burr; Endorsed	Federalist nominee for Governor of New York; 1810	Succeeded by Stephen Van Rensselaer
U.S. House of Representatives
Preceded by John Williams	Member of the U.S. House of Representatives from New York's 9th congressional district 1799–1801	Succeeded by Benjamin Walker
