= Andrew B. Dougherty =

American politician

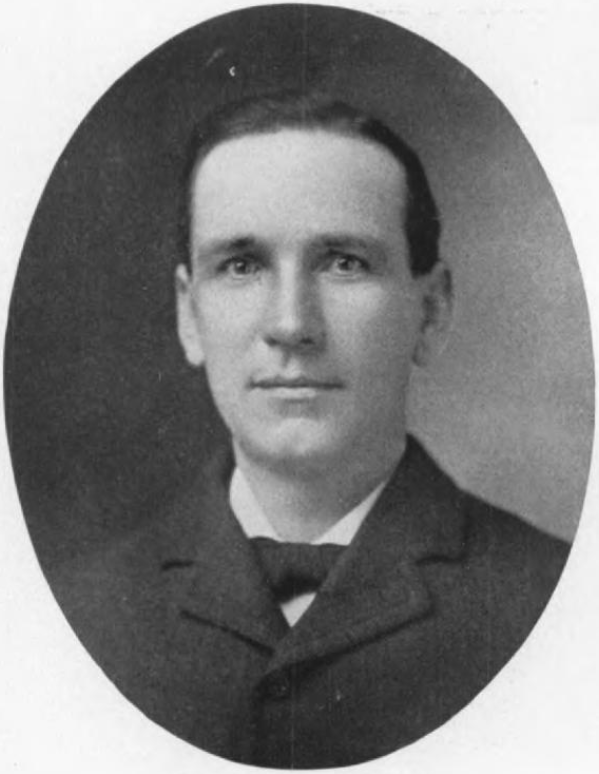

Michigan Attorney General
- In office 1923–1926
- Governor: Alex J. Groesbeck
- Preceded by: Merlin Wiley
- Succeeded by: Clare Retan

Personal details
- Born: October 17, 1863 Saint John, New Brunswick, Canada
- Died: January 8, 1928 (aged 64) Lansing, Michigan, US
- Resting place: Maple Grove Cemetery, Elk Rapids
- Party: Republican

Andrew B. Dougherty (October 17, 1863 – January 8, 1928) was a Canadian-born American politician.

== Early life ==
Dougherty was born on October 17, 1863, in Saint John, New Brunswick, British North America. His father was Archibald K. Dougherty. Dougherty's family moved to Michigan when he was five years old.

== Career ==
In 1899, Dougherty was a member of the Michigan Republican State Central Committee. In 1904, Dougherty was a delegate to Republican National Convention from Michigan. In 1912, unsuccessfully ran as a candidate for presidential elector for Michigan. Dougherty was appointed to the position of Michigan Attorney General in 1923, and he served in that position until 1926.

== Death ==
Dougherty died on January 8, 1928, in Lansing, Michigan. He was interred at Maple Grove Cemetery in Elk Rapids, Michigan.

Legal offices
Preceded by Merlin Wiley	Michigan Attorney General; 1923–1926	Succeeded by Clare Retan
