= Jacob J. Van Riper =

American lawyer and politician

Jacob J. Van Riper

Jacob James Van Riper (March 8, 1838 – December 4, 1912) was an American lawyer and politician. He served as a delegate to the 1867 Michigan state constitutional convention, representing Cass County. He served as the Attorney General of the State of Michigan from 1881 to 1885. He later served as a probate judge in Berrien County, Michigan from 1893 to 1901. He also served on the University of Michigan Board of Regents from 1880 to 1886.

Legal offices
Preceded by Otto Kirchner	Michigan Attorney General; 1881–1885	Succeeded by Moses Taggart
