= List of people who have held multiple United States Cabinet-level positions =

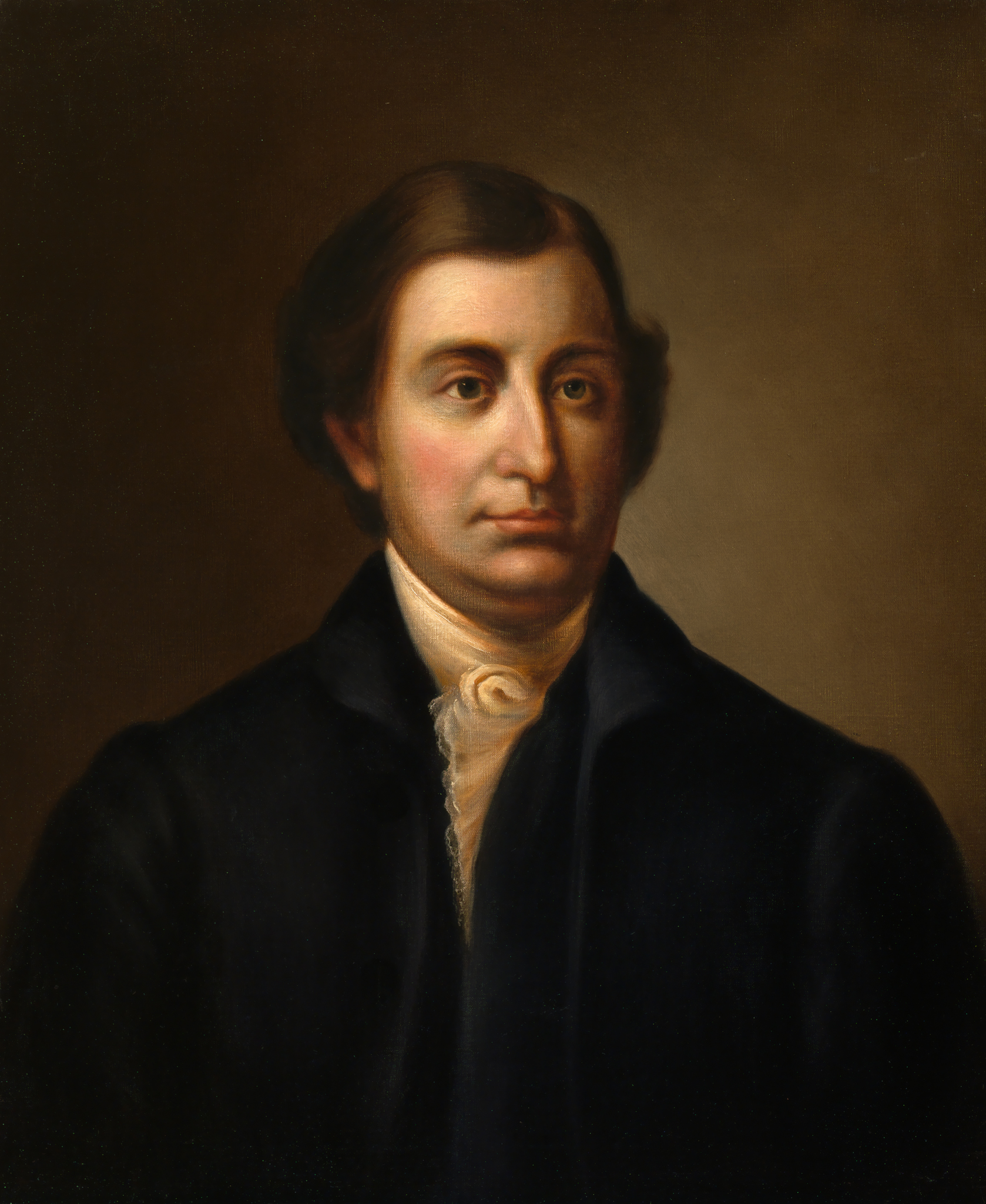
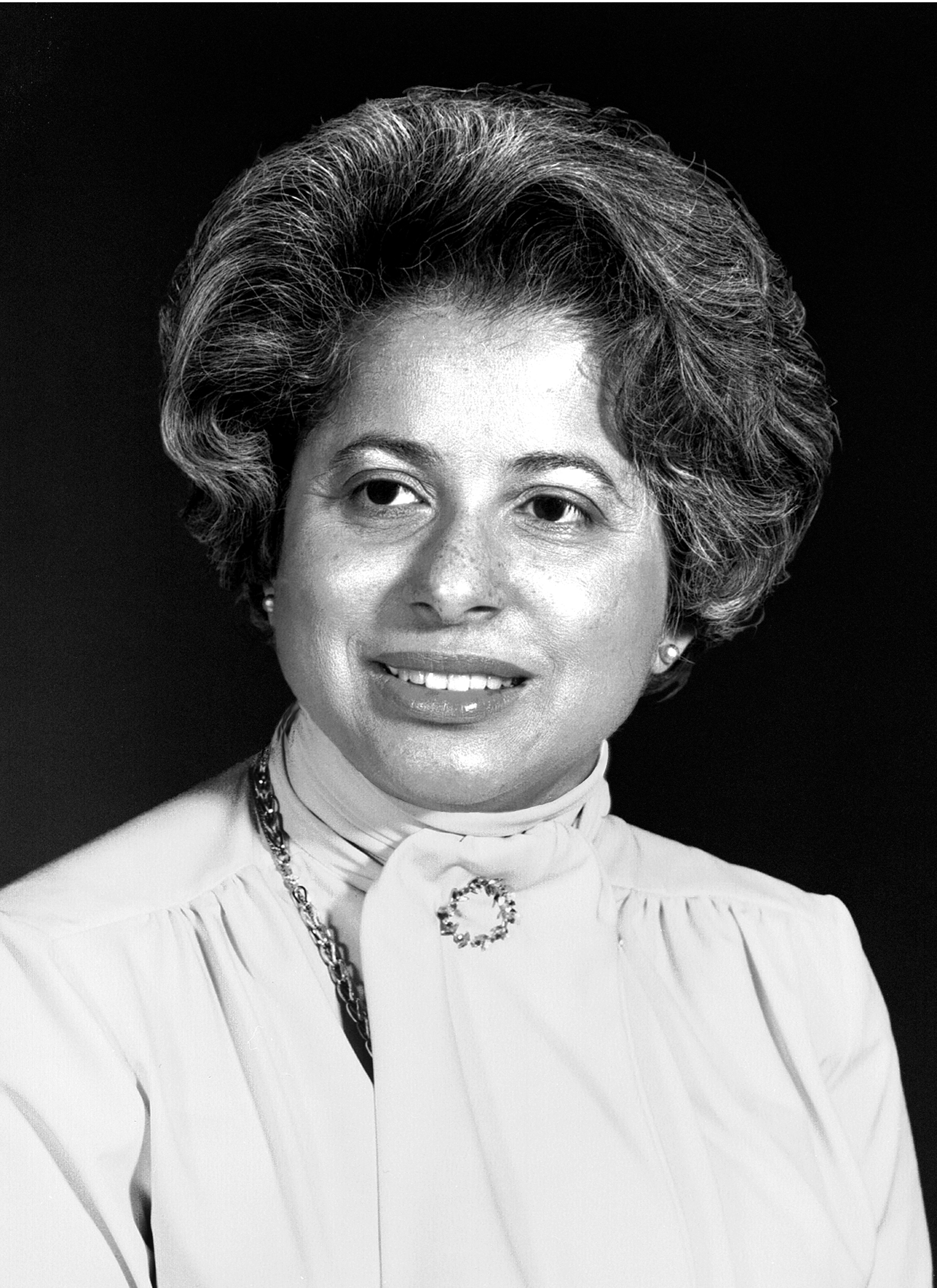
Edmund Randolph (left) and Patricia Roberts Harris (right) are, respectively, the first person and the first woman to serve in multiple cabinet positions.

The Cabinet of the United States, which is the principal advisory body to the President of the United States, has had numerous permanent members serve as heads of multiple different federal executive departments, along with the Vice President or other cabinet-level positions, which can differ under each president. As the years progressed, some departments lost their original status in the president's cabinet, while other offices were established or reorganized as such. Unlike in many parliamentary cabinets, it is generally less common in the United States for officeholders to obtain multiple positions over the years.

Edmund Randolph became the first person to have served in two different presidential cabinet posts when he was appointed Secretary of State by President George Washington in 1794 after previously serving as Attorney General during Washington's first term in office. Patricia Roberts Harris was the first woman and the first person of color to serve multiple posts in a president's cabinet when President Jimmy Carter appointed her Secretary of Health and Human Services (Note: The position was established the Secretary of Health, Education, and Welfare on April 11, 1953; thereafter became the Secretary of Health and Human Services on May 4, 1980.) in 1979, having earlier served as Secretary of Housing and Urban Development through the first half of Carter's administration.

Elliot Richardson held the most different positions within the presidential cabinet with four, having served as Secretary of Health, Education, and Welfare; Secretary of Defense; and Attorney General, all three under President Richard Nixon, as well as Secretary of Commerce for Nixon's successor, Gerald Ford. That record was equaled by George Shultz, who served successively within the Nixon administration—first as Secretary of Labor, then in a cabinet-rank position as Director of the Office of Management and Budget, and finally as Secretary of the Treasury—before being appointed Secretary of State under President Ronald Reagan.

== List of multiple cabinet-level officeholders ==
The following list includes people who have led two or more different executive departments or other cabinet-level offices, which can vary under each president. The table below is organized by date of second appointment or election to such a position. Officeholders whose terms begin the same day are ranked alphabetically by last name.

Name	Office	Start	End
Edmund Randolph	Attorney General	September 26, 1789	January 26, 1794
Edmund Randolph	Secretary of State	January 2, 1794	August 20, 1795
Timothy Pickering	Secretary of War	January 2, 1795	December 10, 1795
Timothy Pickering	Secretary of State	December 10, 1795	May 12, 1800
Samuel Dexter	Secretary of War	June 1, 1800	January 31, 1801
Samuel Dexter	Secretary of the Treasury	January 1, 1801	May 13, 1801
Robert Smith	Secretary of the Navy	July 27, 1801	March 4, 1809
Robert Smith	Secretary of State	March 6, 1809	April 1, 1811
James Monroe	Secretary of State	April 6, 1811	March 4, 1817
James Monroe	Secretary of War	September 27, 1814	March 2, 1815
William H. Crawford	Secretary of War	August 1, 1815	October 22, 1816
William H. Crawford	Secretary of the Treasury	October 22, 1816	March 6, 1825
Richard Rush	Attorney General	February 10, 1814	November 12, 1817
Richard Rush	Secretary of the Treasury	March 7, 1825	March 5, 1829
Louis McLane	Secretary of the Treasury	August 8, 1831	May 29, 1833
Louis McLane	Secretary of State	May 29, 1833	June 30, 1834
Roger B. Taney	Attorney General	July 20, 1831	November 14, 1833
Roger B. Taney	Secretary of the Treasury	September 23, 1833	June 25, 1834
Levi Woodbury	Secretary of the Navy	May 23, 1831	June 30, 1834
Levi Woodbury	Secretary of the Treasury	July 1, 1834	March 4, 1841
Abel P. Upshur	Secretary of the Navy	October 11, 1841	July 23, 1843
Abel P. Upshur	Secretary of State	July 24, 1843	February 28, 1844
John C. Calhoun	Secretary of War	December 8, 1817	March 4, 1825
John C. Calhoun	Secretary of State	April 1, 1844	March 10, 1845
John Y. Mason	Secretary of the Navy	March 26, 1844	March 4, 1845
John Y. Mason	Attorney General	March 5, 1845	October 16, 1846
John Y. Mason	Secretary of the Navy	September 10, 1846	March 4, 1849
Thomas Ewing	Secretary of the Treasury	March 4, 1841	September 11, 1841
Thomas Ewing	Secretary of the Interior	March 8, 1849	July 22, 1850
William L. Marcy	Secretary of War	March 6, 1845	March 4, 1849
William L. Marcy	Secretary of State	March 7, 1853	March 6, 1857
Lewis Cass	Secretary of War	August 1, 1831	October 4, 1836
Lewis Cass	Secretary of State	March 6, 1857	December 14, 1860
Isaac Toucey	Attorney General	June 21, 1848	March 3, 1849
Isaac Toucey	Secretary of the Navy	March 7, 1857	March 4, 1861
Jeremiah S. Black	Attorney General	March 6, 1857	December 16, 1860
Jeremiah S. Black	Secretary of State	December 17, 1860	March 5, 1861
Joseph Holt	Postmaster General	March 9, 1859	December 31, 1860
Joseph Holt	Secretary of War	January 18, 1861	March 5, 1861
Edwin Stanton	Attorney General	December 20, 1860	March 4, 1861
Edwin Stanton	Secretary of War	January 20, 1862	May 28, 1868
Alphonso Taft	Secretary of War	March 8, 1876	May 22, 1876
Alphonso Taft	Attorney General	May 22, 1876	March 4, 1877
William M. Evarts	Attorney General	July 17, 1868	March 4, 1869
William M. Evarts	Secretary of State	March 12, 1877	March 7, 1881
Walter Q. Gresham	Postmaster General	April 9, 1883	September 4, 1884
Walter Q. Gresham	Secretary of the Treasury	September 5, 1884	October 28, 1884
Walter Q. Gresham	Secretary of State	March 7, 1893	May 28, 1895
William Freeman Vilas	Postmaster General	March 6, 1885	January 6, 1888
William Freeman Vilas	Secretary of the Interior	January 16, 1888	March 6, 1889
Richard Olney	Attorney General	March 6, 1893	June 10, 1895
Richard Olney	Secretary of State	June 10, 1895	March 5, 1897
John Sherman	Secretary of the Treasury	March 10, 1877	March 3, 1881
John Sherman	Secretary of State	March 6, 1897	April 27, 1898
William Henry Moody	Secretary of the Navy	May 1, 1902	June 30, 1904
William Henry Moody	Attorney General	July 1, 1904	December 12, 1906
George B. Cortelyou	Secretary of Commerce and Labor (Note: The position was established the Secretary of Commerce and Labor on February 18, 1903; thereafter became the Secretary of Commerce on March 5, 1913.)	February 18, 1903	June 30, 1904
George B. Cortelyou	Postmaster General	March 6, 1905	January 14, 1907
George B. Cortelyou	Secretary of the Treasury	March 4, 1907	March 7, 1909
Elihu Root	Secretary of War	August 1, 1899	January 31, 1904
Elihu Root	Secretary of State	July 19, 1905	January 27, 1909
Charles Joseph Bonaparte	Secretary of the Navy	July 1, 1905	December 16, 1906
Charles Joseph Bonaparte	Attorney General	December 17, 1906	March 4, 1909
Victor H. Metcalf	Secretary of Commerce and Labor	July 1, 1904	December 16, 1906
Victor H. Metcalf	Secretary of the Navy	December 17, 1906	November 30, 1908
Philander C. Knox	Attorney General	April 5, 1901	June 30, 1904
Philander C. Knox	Secretary of State	March 6, 1909	March 5, 1913
George von Lengerke Meyer	Postmaster General	January 15, 1907	March 4, 1909
George von Lengerke Meyer	Secretary of the Navy	March 6, 1909	March 4, 1913
David F. Houston	Secretary of Agriculture	March 6, 1913	February 2, 1920
David F. Houston	Secretary of the Treasury	February 2, 1920	March 3, 1921
Hubert Work	Postmaster General	March 4, 1922	March 4, 1923
Hubert Work	Secretary of the Interior	March 4, 1923	July 24, 1928
Henry L. Stimson	Secretary of War	May 22, 1911	May 4, 1913
Henry L. Stimson	Secretary of State	March 28, 1929	March 4, 1933
Henry L. Stimson	Secretary of War	July 10, 1940	September 21, 1945
Henry A. Wallace	Secretary of Agriculture	March 4, 1933	September 4, 1940
Henry A. Wallace	Vice President	January 20, 1941	January 20, 1945
Henry A. Wallace	Secretary of Commerce	March 2, 1945	September 20, 1946
James Forrestal	Secretary of the Navy	May 19, 1944	September 17, 1947
James Forrestal	Secretary of Defense	September 17, 1947	March 28, 1949
Kenneth Claiborne Royall	Secretary of War	July 19, 1947	September 18, 1947
Kenneth Claiborne Royall	Secretary of the Army	September 18, 1947	April 27, 1949
George Marshall	Secretary of State	January 21, 1947	January 20, 1949
George Marshall	Secretary of Defense	September 21, 1950	September 12, 1951
Arthur Goldberg	Secretary of Labor	January 21, 1961	September 20, 1962
Arthur Goldberg	United States Ambassador to the United Nations	July 28, 1965	June 24, 1968
Maurice Stans	Director of the Bureau of the Budget (Note: The position was established the Director of the Bureau of the Budget on June 23, 1921; thereafter became the Director of the Management and Budget on July 1, 1970.)	March 18, 1958	January 21, 1961
Maurice Stans	Secretary of Commerce	January 21, 1969	February 15, 1972
William P. Rogers	Attorney General	October 23, 1957	January 20, 1961
William P. Rogers	Secretary of State	January 22, 1969	September 3, 1973
Robert Finch	Secretary of Health, Education, and Welfare	January 21, 1969	June 23, 1970
Robert Finch	Counselor to the President	June 23, 1970	December 15, 1972
George Shultz	Secretary of Labor	January 22, 1969	July 1, 1970
George Shultz	Director of the Management and Budget	July 1, 1970	June 11, 1972
George Shultz	Secretary of the Treasury	June 12, 1972	May 8, 1974
George Shultz	Secretary of State	July 16, 1982	January 20, 1989
Elliot Richardson	Secretary of Health, Education, and Welfare	June 24, 1970	January 29, 1973
Elliot Richardson	Secretary of Defense	January 30, 1973	May 24, 1973
Elliot Richardson	Attorney General	May 25, 1973	October 20, 1973
Elliot Richardson	Secretary of Commerce	February 2, 1976	January 20, 1977
Caspar Weinberger	Director of the Management and Budget	June 12, 1972	February 1, 1973
Caspar Weinberger	Secretary of Health, Education, and Welfare	February 12, 1973	August 8, 1975
Caspar Weinberger	Secretary of Defense	January 21, 1981	November 23, 1987
Donald Rumsfeld	Counselor to the President	December 11, 1970	October 15, 1971
Donald Rumsfeld	White House Chief of Staff	September 21, 1974	November 20, 1975
Donald Rumsfeld	Secretary of Defense	November 20, 1975	January 20, 1977
Donald Rumsfeld	Secretary of Defense	January 20, 2001	December 18, 2006
James Thomas Lynn	Secretary of Housing and Urban Development	February 2, 1973	February 5, 1975
James Thomas Lynn	Director of the Management and Budget	February 10, 1975	January 20, 1977
Frederick B. Dent	Secretary of Commerce	February 2, 1973	March 26, 1975
Frederick B. Dent	United States Trade Representative	March 26, 1975	January 20, 1977
Rogers Morton	Secretary of the Interior	January 29, 1971	April 30, 1975
Rogers Morton	Secretary of Commerce	May 1, 1975	February 2, 1976
Rogers Morton	Counselor to the President	February 2, 1976	April 1, 1976
Daniel Patrick Moynihan	Counselor to the President	November 5, 1969	December 31, 1970
Daniel Patrick Moynihan	United States Ambassador to the United Nations	June 30, 1975	February 2, 1976
James R. Schlesinger	Secretary of Defense	July 2, 1973	November 19, 1975
James R. Schlesinger	Secretary of Energy	August 9, 1977	August 23, 1979
Patricia Roberts Harris	Secretary of Housing and Urban Development	January 23, 1977	September 10, 1979
Patricia Roberts Harris	Secretary of Health and Human Services	August 3, 1979	January 20, 1981
George H. W. Bush	United States Ambassador to the United Nations	March 1, 1971	January 18, 1973
George H. W. Bush	Vice President	January 20, 1981	January 20, 1989
Donald P. Hodel	Secretary of Energy	November 5, 1982	February 7, 1985
Donald P. Hodel	Secretary of the Interior	February 8, 1985	January 20, 1989
Edwin Meese	Counselor to the President	January 20, 1981	February 25, 1985
Edwin Meese	Attorney General	February 25, 1985	August 12, 1988
Bill Brock	United States Trade Representative	January 23, 1981	April 29, 1985
Bill Brock	Secretary of Labor	April 29, 1985	October 31, 1987
James Baker	Secretary of the Treasury	February 4, 1985	August 17, 1988
James Baker	Secretary of State	January 25, 1989	August 23, 1992
Elizabeth Dole	Secretary of Transportation	February 7, 1983	September 30, 1987
Elizabeth Dole	Secretary of Labor	January 25, 1989	November 23, 1990
Carla Anderson Hills	Secretary of Housing and Urban Development	March 10, 1975	January 20, 1977
Carla Anderson Hills	United States Trade Representative	February 6, 1989	January 20, 1993
Clayton Yeutter	United States Trade Representative	July 1, 1985	January 20, 1989
Clayton Yeutter	Secretary of Agriculture	February 16, 1989	March 1, 1991
Clayton Yeutter	Counselor to the President	February 1, 1992	January 20, 1993
Dick Cheney	White House Chief of Staff	November 21, 1975	January 20, 1977
Dick Cheney	Secretary of Defense	March 21, 1989	January 20, 1993
Dick Cheney	Vice President	January 20, 2001	January 20, 2009
Leon Panetta	Director of the Management and Budget	January 21, 1993	July 17, 1994
Leon Panetta	White House Chief of Staff	July 17, 1994	January 20, 1997
Leon Panetta	Secretary of Defense	July 1, 2011	February 26, 2013
Mickey Kantor	United States Trade Representative	January 21, 1993	April 12, 1996
Mickey Kantor	Secretary of Commerce	April 12, 1996	January 21, 1997
Erskine Bowles	Administrator of the Small Business Administration	May 7, 1993	October 3, 1994
Erskine Bowles	White House Chief of Staff	January 20, 1997	October 20, 1998
Madeleine Albright	United States Ambassador to the United Nations	January 27, 1993	January 21, 1997
Madeleine Albright	Secretary of State	January 23, 1997	January 20, 2001
Federico Peña	Secretary of Transportation	January 21, 1993	February 14, 1997
Federico Peña	Secretary of Energy	March 12, 1997	June 30, 1998
Bill Richardson	United States Ambassador to the United Nations	February 18, 1997	August 18, 1998
Bill Richardson	Secretary of Energy	August 18, 1998	January 20, 2001
Andrew Card	Secretary of Transportation	February 24, 1992	January 20, 1993
Andrew Card	White House Chief of Staff	January 20, 2001	April 14, 2006
Norman Mineta	Secretary of Commerce	July 20, 2000	January 20, 2001
Norman Mineta	Secretary of Transportation	January 25, 2001	July 7, 2006
Mike Leavitt	Administrator of the Environmental Protection Agency	November 6, 2003	January 26, 2005
Mike Leavitt	Secretary of Health and Human Services	January 26, 2005	January 20, 2009
Joshua Bolten	Director of the Management and Budget	June 6, 2003	April 14, 2006
Joshua Bolten	White House Chief of Staff	April 14, 2006	January 20, 2009
Rob Portman	United States Trade Representative	May 17, 2005	May 29, 2006
Rob Portman	Director of the Management and Budget	May 29, 2006	June 19, 2007
William M. Daley	Secretary of Commerce	January 30, 1997	July 19, 2000
William M. Daley	White House Chief of Staff	January 13, 2011	January 27, 2012
Jack Lew	Director of the Management and Budget	May 21, 1998	January 19, 2001
Jack Lew	White House Chief of Staff	January 27, 2012	January 20, 2013
Jack Lew	Secretary of the Treasury	February 28, 2013	January 20, 2017
Sylvia Mathews Burwell	Director of the Management and Budget	April 24, 2013	June 9, 2014
Sylvia Mathews Burwell	Secretary of Health and Human Services	June 9, 2014	January 20, 2017
Shaun Donovan	Secretary of Housing and Urban Development	January 26, 2009	July 28, 2014
Shaun Donovan	Director of the Management and Budget	August 5, 2014	January 20, 2017
Elaine Chao	Secretary of Labor	January 29, 2001	January 20, 2009
Elaine Chao	Secretary of Transportation	January 31, 2017	January 11, 2021
John F. Kelly	Secretary of Homeland Security	January 20, 2017	July 31, 2017
John F. Kelly	White House Chief of Staff	July 31, 2017	January 2, 2019
Mike Pompeo	Director of the Central Intelligence Agency	January 23, 2017	April 26, 2018
Mike Pompeo	Secretary of State	April 26, 2018	January 20, 2021
Janet Yellen	Chair of the Council of Economic Advisers	February 18, 1997	August 3, 1999
Janet Yellen	Secretary of the Treasury	January 26, 2021	January 20, 2025
Denis McDonough	White House Chief of Staff	January 20, 2013	January 20, 2017
Denis McDonough	Secretary of Veterans Affairs	February 9, 2021	January 20, 2025
John Ratcliffe	Director of National Intelligence	May 26, 2020	January 20, 2021
John Ratcliffe	Director of the Central Intelligence Agency	January 23, 2025	Incumbent
Linda McMahon	Administrator of the Small Business Administration	February 14, 2017	April 12, 2019
Linda McMahon	Secretary of Education	March 3, 2025	Incumbent

=== Former permanent cabinet members ===
- The Secretary of War (1789–1947) became defunct when the Department of War was split between the Department of the Army and the Department of the Air Force by the National Security Act of 1947, and both were absorbed into the Department of Defense in 1949.
- The Postmaster General (1829–1971) ceased to be a member of the cabinet when the Post Office Department was re-organized into the United States Postal Service (USPS) by the Postal Reorganization Act of 1970, a special agency independent of the executive branch.
- The Secretaries of the Army (1947–1949), Navy (1798–1949), and Air Force (1947–1949) ceased to be members of the cabinet when their particular departments was absorbed into the Department of Defense in 1949.

=== Cabinet-level positions ===
The following positions have intermittently been raised to cabinet rank:

- Vice President (1921–1923, 1929–present)
- Ambassador to the United Nations (1953–1989, 1993–2001, 2009–2018, 2021–2025)
- Director of the Office of Management and Budget (1953–1961, 1969–present)
- White House Chief of Staff (1953–1961, 1974–1977, 1993–present)
- Counselor to the President (1969–1977, 1981–1985, 1992–1993)
- White House Counsel (1974–1977)
- United States Trade Representative (1975–present)
- Chair of the Council of Economic Advisers (1977–1981, 1993–2001, 2009–2017, 2021–2025)
- National Security Advisor (1977–1981)
- Director of Central Intelligence (1981–1989, 1995–2001)
- Administrator of the Environmental Protection Agency (1993–present)
- Director of the Office of National Drug Control Policy (1993–2009)
- Administrator of the Small Business Administration (1994–2001, 2012–present)
- Director of the Federal Emergency Management Agency (1996–2001)
- Director of National Intelligence (2017–present)
- Director of the Central Intelligence Agency (2017–2021, 2023–present)
- Director of the Office of Science and Technology Policy (2021–2025)

== See also ==
- Cabinet reshuffle
- List of people who have served in all three branches of the United States federal government
