= Samuel Livingston Breese =

American rear admiral (1794–1870)

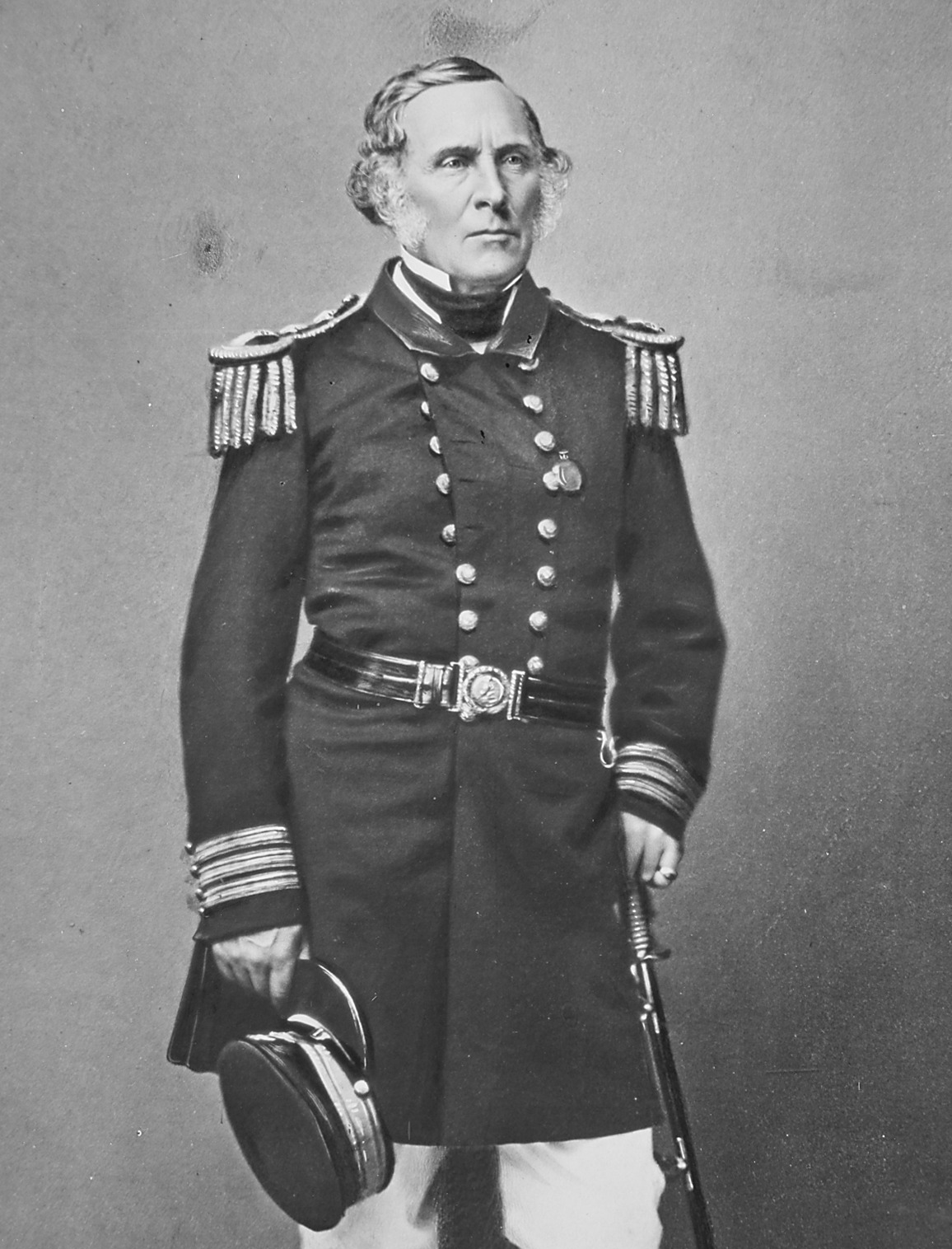
- Born: August 6, 1794; Utica, New York, U.S.
- Died: December 17, 1870 (aged 76); Mount Airy, Philadelphia, Pennsylvania, U.S.
- Burial place: Forest Hill Cemetery; Utica, New York, U.S.
- Military career
- Allegiance: United States
- Branch: United States Navy
- Service years: 1810–1862
- Rank: Rear admiral
- Commands: USS Cumberland; USS Albany; Mediterranean Squadron
- Conflicts: War of 1812; Mexican–American War; American Civil War

Samuel Livingston Breese (August 6, 1794 – December 17, 1870) was a rear admiral in the United States Navy. His active-duty career included service in the War of 1812, the Mexican–American War, and the American Civil War.

== Early life ==
He was born in Utica on August 6, 1794, and grew up in Whitesboro, New York. He was the son of Arthur Breese (1770–1825) and his first wife, Catherine (née Livingston) Breese (1775–1808). Among his siblings was younger brother Sidney Breese, who later became a U.S. Senator from Illinois, and sisters, Sarah Breese (wife of Bleeker Lansing and James Platt), and Elizabeth Breese (wife of William Malcolm Sands) as well as a half-sister, Sarah Ann (née Breese) Walker. Samuel Morse was a cousin.

His maternal grandfather was farmer and author Henry Beekman Livingston, a descendant of Robert Livingston the Elder, the 1st Lord of Livingston Manor.

He attended Union College as part of the Class of 1813, but did not graduate.

== Career ==
Breese was appointed midshipman in the United States Navy on September 10, 1810. During the War of 1812, he served under Commodore Thomas Macdonough at the Battle of Lake Champlain, and for gallant conduct at Plattsburgh received a sword and a vote of thanks from the United States Congress.

He was commissioned as lieutenant on April 28, 1816, commander in December 1835, and captain on September 8, 1841. He was attached to the Philadelphia Navy Yard in 1836, and to the naval rendezvous at Baltimore in 1841.

He served in the Mediterranean against the pirates of Algiers from 1826 to 1827, and was in the Levant during the war between Turkey and Greece. He commanded the frigate USS Cumberland of the Mediterranean squadron in 1845, and was in the Atlantic Ocean commanding the Albany during the Mexican–American War in 1846 and 1847 where he took part in the capture of Tuxpan, Tabasco, and Vera Cruz. For a short time, he was Military Governor of Tuxpan.

In 1848 he performed special duty on the lakes, and from 1853 until 1855, commanded the Norfolk Navy Yard. From 1856 until 1859 he was commander of the Mediterranean Squadron, and from 1859 until 1861 served as commandant of the Brooklyn Navy Yard.

=== Flag rank and retirement ===
On July 16, 1862, he was commissioned a Commodore and placed on the retired list, and on 3 September 1862, was one of the thirteen Commodores first selected to fill the list of Rear Admirals, when that rank was introduced into the United States Navy in 1862. Placed on the retired list, he was appointed lighthouse inspector in the same year. He was made Port Admiral at Philadelphia in 1869.

== Personal life ==
Breese was twice married, and had no children from either marriage. In about 1825, Breese married his first wife, Frances Hogan Stout (1806–1853), the daughter of Capt. Jacob Stout and Fanny (née Carpender) Stout. Her elder brother was Charles Raintaux Stout.

After the death of his first wife, he remarried on June 21, 1855, to his second wife, Emma Lovett (1819–1892), daughter of Thomas Sydney Lovett and Louisa (née Doubleday) Lovett. She survived him.

Rear Admiral Breese died in Mount Airy, Philadelphia, Pennsylvania, aged 76, and was buried in Forest Hills Cemetery in Utica, New York.
