= Zeph =

Zeph is a given name. Notable people with the name include:

- Zeph E. Daniel, American screenwriter
- Zeph Ellis (1988–2026), English rapper
- Zeph Gladstone (1937–2002), British television actress
- Zeph Hutchinson (1888–1959), British trade unionist
- Zeph Lee (born 1963), American football player

== See also ==
- Mega Zeph, roller coaster in New Orleans, Louisiana
- Zephaniah (disambiguation)
