= William W. Potter (Michigan politician) =

American judge

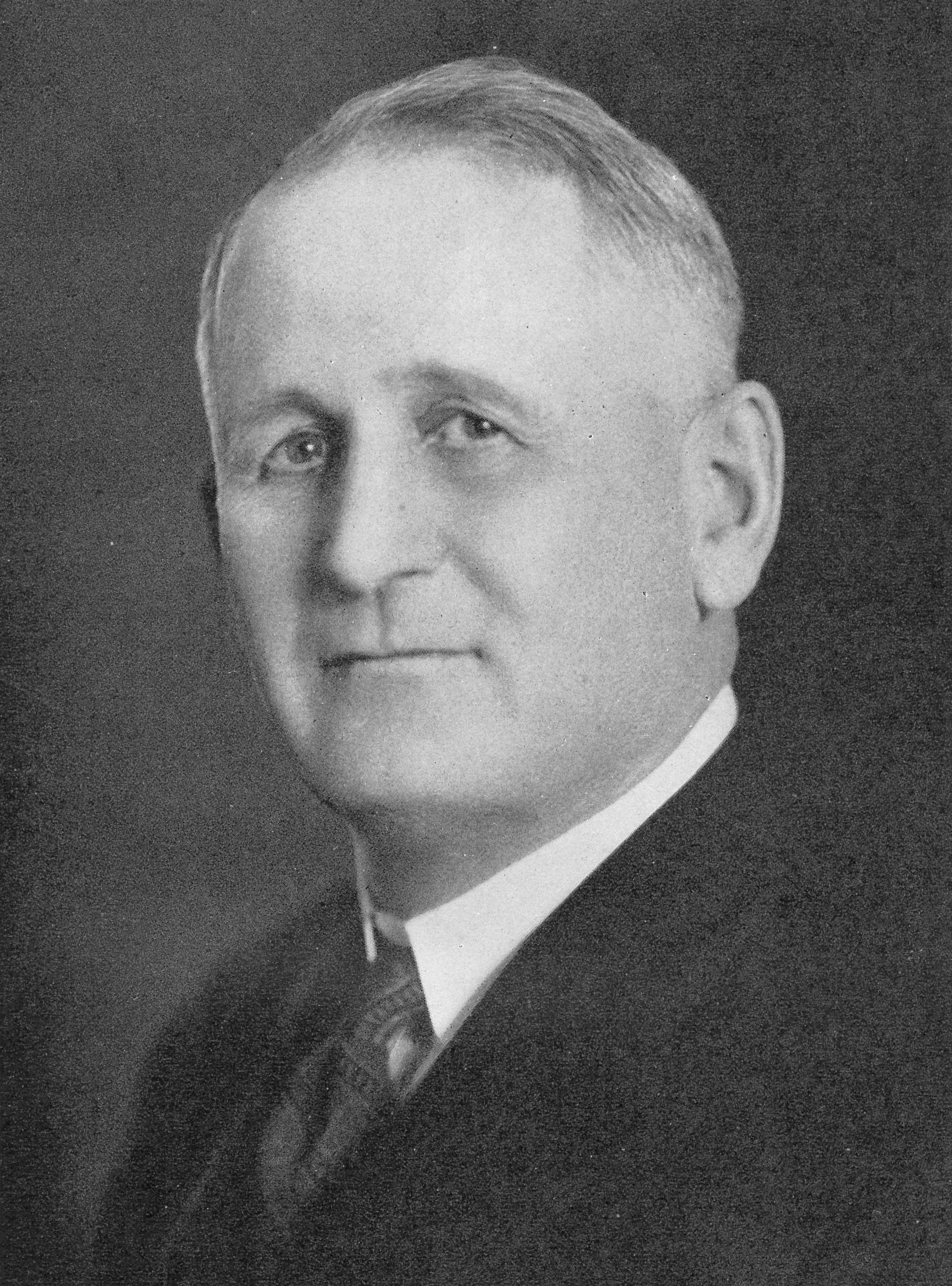

Attorney General of Michigan
- In office 1927–1928
- Governor: Fred W. Green
- Preceded by: Clare Retan
- Succeeded by: Wilber M. Brucker

Member of the Michigan Senate from the 15th district
- In office 1899–1900
- Preceded by: Arthur D. Hughes
- Succeeded by: Cassius L. Glasgow

Personal details
- Born: August 1, 1869 Maple Grove Township, Barry County, Michigan, U.S.
- Died: July 21, 1940 (aged 70)
- Education: University of Michigan Law School

William W. Potter (August 1, 1869 – July 21, 1940) was a politician from the U.S. state of Michigan.

Potter was born to Lucien B. and Clarinda L. Potter in Maple Grove Township, Barry County, Michigan. He was a resident of East Lansing and was married to Margaret D. Richardson.

Potter was an 1895 graduate of the University of Michigan Law School, and a member of the Michigan Senate from the 15th District, 1899–1900; Barry County Prosecuting Attorney, 1909–12; he became a candidate in the primary for Governor of Michigan, 1924. He served as Michigan Attorney General from 1927 to 1928 and resigned when he was appointed justice of Michigan Supreme Court. In 1935, he served as chief justice of the state supreme court.

William W. Potter was a member of Freemasons, Knights of Pythias, and Odd Fellows. He died just before his 71st birthday, in office, following an automobile accident. He is interred at Wilcox Cemetery, near his birthplace.

Legal offices
Preceded by Clare Retan	Michigan Attorney General; 1927–1928	Succeeded by Wilber M. Brucker
