= Zephaniah Platt (Michigan Attorney General) =

American politician

Michigan Attorney General
- In office 1841–1843
- Governor: James Wright Gordon; John S. Barry
- Preceded by: Peter Morey
- Succeeded by: Elon Farnsworth

Personal details
- Born: March 31, 1796 Pleasant Valley, Dutchess County, New York
- Died: April 20, 1871 (aged 75) Aiken, Aiken County, South Carolina
- Party: Whig
- Spouse: Cornelia Jenkins (m. 1818)
- Relations: Zephaniah Platt (grandfather); Charles Z. Platt (uncle); John Henry Livingston (uncle)
- Children: 7, including Mary
- Parent(s): Jonas Platt; Helena Livingston Platt

Zephaniah Platt (March 31, 1796 – April 20, 1871) was an American lawyer and politician from Michigan. He was Michigan Attorney General from 1841 to 1843.

== Life ==
Platt was born on March 31, 1796, in Pleasant Valley, Dutchess County, New York. He was the son of New York Supreme Court Justice Jonas Platt and Helena (nee Livingston) Platt (1767-1859), and was baptized at the Presbyterian Church in Pleasant Valley, N.Y. Among his siblings was sister, Helen Livingston Platt, who married Truman Parmelee and, after his death, Dr. Henry W. Bell.

He was a grandson of Zephaniah Platt, and a nephew of Charles Z. Platt and of John Henry Livingston.

== Career ==
He removed to the Michigan Territory and practiced law at Jackson, Michigan. Platt, an antislavery Whig, was Attorney General of the State of Michigan from 1841 to 1843. He also served as a vice president in the American Anti-Slavery Society.

He attended the 1842 Ojibwe treaty negotiations with the "Lake Superior Chippewa" at LaPointe and signed the treaty as a witness. Subsequently, Platt acted as representative for some of the American Fur Company's Ojibwe traders seeking recompense for past Indian debts.

After the end of the American Civil War, he removed to South Carolina, and was Judge of the 2nd Circuit Court from 1868 until his death.

== Personal life ==
On September 30, 1818, Platt married Cornelia Jenkins (d. 1890), and they had seven children including Mary Platt (1843–1911), who was first married to Samuel J. Agnew and after a divorce married her cousin, Theodore Weld Parmele (1833–1893).

Platt died on April 20, 1871, in Aiken, Aiken County, South Carolina.

Legal offices
Preceded by Peter Morey	Michigan Attorney General; 1841–1843	Succeeded by Elon Farnsworth
