= List of U.S. Supreme Court justices who also served in the U.S. Congress =

Since the Supreme Court of the United States was established in 1789, 116 persons have served on the court. Of these, several also served in the United States Congress, either before or after their tenure as a justice. Six were incumbent members of the Senate at the time of their appointment, while one—James Moore Wayne—was an incumbent member of the House of Representatives. The others had previously served in the Senate or the House or both. Additionally, one justice—David Davis—resigned from the Supreme Court to serve in the Senate.

== Senators ==
There have been 14 Supreme Court justices with prior service in the Senate, and one with subsequent Senate service.

Name	State	Party	Senate service	Supreme Court service	Appointer
William Paterson	New Jersey	Federalist	1789–1790	1793–1806	George Washington (1789–1797)
Oliver Ellsworth	Connecticut	Federalist	1789–1796	1796–1800	George Washington (1789–1797)
Levi Woodbury	New Hampshire	Democratic	1825–1831	1845–1851	James K. Polk (1845–1849)
Levi Woodbury	New Hampshire	Democratic	1841–1845	1845–1851	James K. Polk (1845–1849)
John McKinley (Note: Also served in the U.S. House of Representatives)	Alabama	Democratic	1826–1831	1838–1852	Martin Van Buren (1837–1841)
John McKinley	Alabama	Democratic	1837–1837	1838–1852	Martin Van Buren (1837–1841)
Salmon P. Chase	Ohio	Republican (before 1868)	1849–1855; 1861–1861	1864–1873	Abraham Lincoln (1861–1865)
Salmon P. Chase	Ohio	Democratic (1868–1873)	1849–1855; 1861–1861	1864–1873	Abraham Lincoln (1861–1865)
Stanley Matthews	Ohio	Republican	1877–1879	1881–1889	James A. Garfield (1881)
David Davis	Illinois	Republican (before 1870)	1877–1883	1862–1877	Abraham Lincoln (1861–1865)
David Davis	Illinois	Liberal Republican (1870–1872)	1877–1883	1862–1877	Abraham Lincoln (1861–1865)
David Davis	Illinois	Independent (1872–1886)	1877–1883	1862–1877	Abraham Lincoln (1861–1865)
Lucius Quintus Cincinnatus Lamar	Mississippi	Democratic	1877–1885	1888–1893	Grover Cleveland (1885–1889)
Howell Edmunds Jackson	Tennessee	Democratic	1881–1886	1893–1895	Benjamin Harrison (1889–1893)
Edward Douglass White	Louisiana	Democratic	1891–1894	1894–1921	Grover Cleveland (1893–1897)
George Sutherland	Utah	Republican	1905–1917	1922–1938	Warren G. Harding (1921–1923)
Hugo Black	Alabama	Democratic	1927–1937	1937–1971	Franklin D. Roosevelt (1933–1945)
James F. Byrnes	South Carolina	Democratic	1931–1941	1941–1942	Franklin D. Roosevelt (1933–1945)
Sherman Minton	Indiana	Democratic	1935–1941	1949–1956	Harry S. Truman (1945–1953)
Harold Hitz Burton	Ohio	Republican	1941–1945	1945–1958	Harry S. Truman (1945–1953)

== Representatives ==
There have been 17 Supreme Court justices with prior service in the House of Representatives.

Name	District	Party	House service	Supreme Court service	Appointer
Gabriel Duvall	MD 2	Democratic-Republican	1794–1796	1811–1835	James Madison (1809–1817)
John Marshall	VA 13	Federalist	1799–1800	1801–1835	John Adams (1797–1801)
Joseph Story	MA 2	Democratic-Republican	1808–1809	1812–1845	James Madison (1809–1817)
John McLean	OH 1	Democratic-Republican (before 1825)	1813–1816	1830–1861	Andrew Jackson (1829–1837)
John McLean	OH 1	National Republican (1825–1828)	1813–1816	1830–1861	Andrew Jackson (1829–1837)
John McLean	OH 1	Democratic (1828–1831)	1813–1816	1830–1861	Andrew Jackson (1829–1837)
John McLean	OH 1	Anti-Masonic (1831–1838)	1813–1816	1830–1861	Andrew Jackson (1829–1837)
John McLean	OH 1	Whig (1838–1848)	1813–1816	1830–1861	Andrew Jackson (1829–1837)
John McLean	OH 1	Free Soil (1848–1854)	1813–1816	1830–1861	Andrew Jackson (1829–1837)
John McLean	OH 1	Republican (1854–1861)	1813–1816	1830–1861	Andrew Jackson (1829–1837)
Philip P. Barbour (Note: Served as Speaker of the House during the 17th Congress (1821–23))	VA 11	Democratic-Republican (before 1828)	1814–1825	1836–1841	Andrew Jackson (1829–1837)
Philip P. Barbour	VA 11	Democratic (1828–1841)	1827–1830	1836–1841	Andrew Jackson (1829–1837)
Henry Baldwin	PA 14	Democratic-Republican (before 1828)	1817–1822	1830–1844	Andrew Jackson (1829–1837)
Henry Baldwin	PA 14	Democratic (1828–1844)	1817–1822	1830–1844	Andrew Jackson (1829–1837)
James M. Wayne	GA AL	Democratic	1829–1835	1835–1867	Andrew Jackson (1829–1837)
John McKinley (Note: Also served in the U.S. Senate)	AL 2	Democratic	1833–1835	1838–1852	Martin Van Buren (1837–1841)
Nathan Clifford	ME 1	Democratic	1839–1843	1858–1881	James Buchanan (1857–1861)
William Strong	PA 9	Democratic (before 1868)	1847–1851	1870–1880	Ulysses S. Grant (1869–1877)
William Strong	PA 9	Republican (1868–1895)	1847–1851	1870–1880	Ulysses S. Grant (1869–1877)
Lucius Quintus Cincinnatus Lamar	MS 1	Democratic	1857–1860	1888–1893	Grover Cleveland (1885–1889)
Lucius Quintus Cincinnatus Lamar	MS 1	Democratic	1873–1877	1888–1893	Grover Cleveland (1885–1889)
Joseph McKenna	CA 3	Republican	1885–1891	1898–1925	William McKinley (1897–1901)
Mahlon Pitney	NJ 4	Republican	1895–1899	1912–1922	William Taft (1909–1913)
William Henry Moody	MA 6	Republican	1895–1902	1906–1910	Theodore Roosevelt (1901–1909)
George Sutherland	UT 1	Republican	1901–1903	1922–1938	Warren G. Harding (1921–1923)
James F. Byrnes	SC 2	Democratic	1911–1925	1941–1942	Franklin D. Roosevelt (1933–1945)
Fred M. Vinson	KY 9	Democratic	1924–1929	1946–1953	Harry S. Truman (1945–1953)
Fred M. Vinson	KY 9	Democratic	1931–1938	1946–1953	Harry S. Truman (1945–1953)

== See also ==
- List of people who have held constitutional office in all three branches of the United States federal government
