= Zephaniah Platt =

American politician

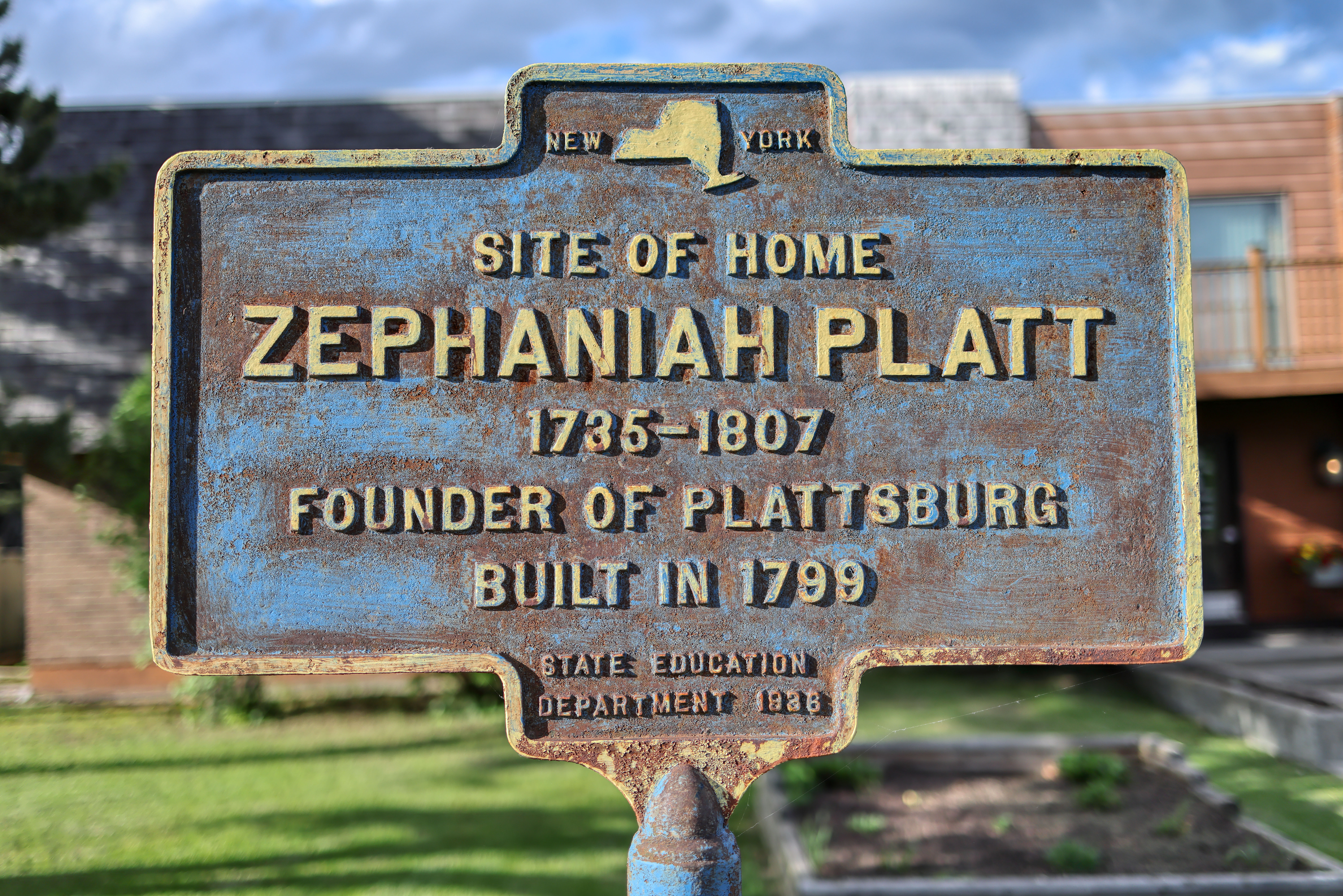
- Historic Marker for Zephaniah Platt

Member of the New York Provincial Congress
- In office 1775–1777

Member of the Committee of Safety
- In office 1777–1777

Member of the New York State Senate
- In office 1777–1783

Member of the Congress of the Confederation
- In office 1785–1786

Personal details
- Born: May 27, 1735 Huntington, Province of New York
- Died: September 12, 1807 (aged 72) Plattsburgh
- Spouses: Mary Hannah Davis (m. 1756; died 1761) Mary Van Wyck (m. 1761)
- Relations: Zephaniah Platt (grandson)
- Children: 14, including Jonas, Charles
- Occupation: lawyer

Zephaniah Platt (May 27, 1735 – September 12, 1807) was an American politician and lawyer, and founder of the U.S. town of Plattsburgh, New York.

== Early life ==
Platt was born in Huntington, Province of New York, to Zephaniah Platt (1705-1778). He was a direct descendant of Richard Platt (1603–1684), who was born in Ware, Hertfordshire, England, and settled in the Connecticut Colony.

Platt received an English education.

== Career ==
Zephaniah Platt practiced law in Poughkeepsie, New York, and was a member of the New York Provincial Congress (1775–1777), Committee of Safety (1777), State Senate (1777–1783), Congress of the Confederation (1785 and 1786), Council of Appointment (1778 and 1781). He was a Dutchess County judge from 1781 to 1795 and delegate to the New York Constitutional Convention in 1788.

In 1788, he founded the town of Plattsburgh in New York, and moved there in 1798 to continue practicing law. He was an originator of the Erie Canal, and was a regent of the University of the State of New York from 1791 until his death, in Plattsburgh, in 1807.

== Personal life ==
Platt was married twice, first to Mary Hannah Davis (1741–1761) in 1756 and had two children:

- Zephaniah Platt (1756–1830)
- Hannah Comstock Platt (b. 1758)

In 1761, he married Mary Van Wyck Platt (1742–1809) and had 12 children including:

- Jonas Platt (1769–1834), who was a U.S. Representative for the 9th Congressional District of New York (1799–1801), lawyer and associate justice of the New York State Supreme Court
- Charles Z. Platt (1773–1822), who was a New York State Assemblyman for Oneida County (1807–1813) and New York State Treasurer (1813–1817)
- James Platt (1788–1870), who married Eliza Floyd, daughter of William Floyd, and had four children. After Eliza's death, he remarried twice, first to Susan Katharine Auchmuty, and secondly, as his third wife, to Sarah (née Breese) Lansing, widow of Bleeker Lansing and sister of Rear Admiral Samuel Livingston Breese and U.S. Senator Sidney Breese.

Platt owned two slaves in his lifetime, a man named "Tone" and a man named "Cato." Tone was manumitted in 1795, whereas Cato was manumitted by the Executor of his will, Jonas Platt, in 1808, four months after his death.

=== Descendants ===
Platt's grandson (son of Jonas Platt) Zephaniah Platt (1796–1871) was Michigan Attorney General.
