= Michigan Attorney General =

Michigan government official

Attorney General of the State of Michigan
- Seal of the attorney general

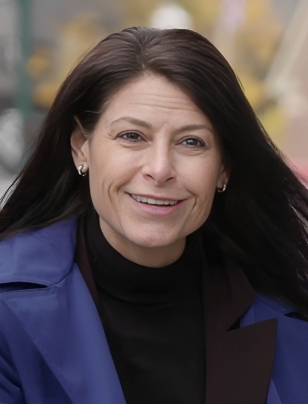
- Incumbent; Dana Nessel since January 1, 2019
- Michigan Department of Attorney General
- Style: The Honorable
- Residence: Private
- Appointer: Popular Election
- Term length: 4 Years, Renewable Once
- Inaugural holder: Daniel LeRoy
- Formation: 1837
- Succession: Third
- Website: michigan.gov/ag

The attorney general of the State of Michigan is the fourth-ranking official in the U.S. state of Michigan. The officeholder is elected statewide in the November general election alongside the governor, lieutenant governor, and secretary of state.

Since the Michigan Constitution of 1963 was adopted, the attorney general has served a term of four years. The officeholder is also limited to two terms, for a total of eight possible years of service; ten possible years of service if the officeholder serves two full terms and less than half of one term as a replacement.

“Inasmuch as the office of Attorney General has common law powers as the chief law enforcement officer of the State, [they] may exercise the powers of a peace officer and may appoint special agents having this status to assist [them] in enforcing [their] powers and carrying out [their] functions” (AG Opinion No. 5236,10/20/1977).

Michigan law, MCL 14.32, provides that "[i]t shall be the duty of the attorney general, when required, to give [their] opinion upon all questions of law submitted to [them] by the legislature, or by either branch thereof, or by the governor, auditor general, treasurer or any other state officer . . . ."

Michigan's current attorney general is Democrat Dana Nessel, who was elected in November 2018, and sworn into office on January 1, 2019.

== Courtesy title ==
The attorney general traditionally receives the courtesy title of The Honorable for life.

== History ==
Under the original 1835 Michigan Constitution, the attorney general was established as an appointed position. They were appointed by the governor with the consent of the state senate. Under the 1850 Michigan Constitution, the attorney general became an elected position. Attorneys general were elected to serve two year terms under this constitution. Under the current 1963 state constitution, the terms of attorneys general were extended to four years. The attorney general was limited to two terms via a state constitutional amendment, which passed in 1992.

== List of attorneys general of Michigan ==
Image	Name	Term	Party / Appointer	Notes	Ref.
	Daniel LeRoy	1836–1837	Stevens T. Mason		
	Peter Morey	1837–1841	Stevens T. Mason		
	Zephaniah Platt	1841–1843	James Wright Gordon		
	Elon Farnsworth	1843–1845	John S. Barry		
	Henry N. Walker	1845–1847	John S. Barry		
	Edward Mundy	1847–1848	Alpheus Felch	Resigned	
	George V. N. Lothrop	1848–1851	Epaphroditus Ransom		
	William Hale	1851–1854	Democratic (Note: First elected Michigan attorney general.)		
	Jacob M. Howard	1855–1860	Republican		
	Charles Upson	1861–1862	Republican		
	Albert Williams	1863–1866	Republican		
	William L. Stoughton	1867–1868	Republican		
	Dwight May	1869–1872	Republican		
	Byron D. Ball	1873–1874	Republican	Resigned	
	Isaac Marston	1874	John J. Bagley (Note: Appointed by governor to fill vacancy.)		
	Andrew J. Smith	1875–1876	Republican		
	Otto Kirchner	1877–1880	Republican		
	Jacob J. Van Riper	1881–1884	Republican		
	Moses Taggart	1885–1888	Republican		
	Stephen V. R. Trowbridge	1889–1890	Republican	Resigned	
	Benjamin W. Huston	1890	Cyrus G. Luce		
	Adolphus A. Ellis	1891–1894	Democratic		
	Fred A. Maynard	1895–1898	Republican		
	Horace M. Oren	1899–1902	Republican		
	Charles A. Blair	1903–1904	Republican		
	John E. Bird	1905–1910	Republican	Resigned	
	Franz C. Kuhn	1910–1912	Fred M. Warner (Note: Initially appointed by governor to fill vacancy, and thereafter elected.)		
	Franz C. Kuhn	1910–1912	Republican	Resigned	
	Roger I. Wykes	1912	Chase Osborn		
	Grant Fellows	1913–1916	Republican		
	Alex J. Groesbeck	1917–1920	Republican		
	Merlin Wiley	1921–1923	Republican		
	Andrew B. Dougherty	1923–1926	Alex J. Groesbeck		
	Andrew B. Dougherty	1923–1926	Republican	Resigned	
	Clare Retan	1926	Alex J. Groesbeck		
	William W. Potter	1927–1928	Republican	Resigned	
	Wilber M. Brucker	1928–1930	Fred W. Green		
	Wilber M. Brucker	1928–1930	Republican		
	Paul W. Voorhies	1931–1932	Republican		
	Patrick H. O'Brien	1933–1934	Democratic		
	Harry S. Toy	1935	Republican	Resigned	
	David H. Crowley	1935–1936	Frank Fitzgerald		
	Raymond W. Starr	1937–1938	Democratic		
	Thomas Read	1939-1940	Republican		
	Herbert J. Rushton	1941–1944	Republican		
	John R. Dethmers	1945–1946	Republican	Resigned	
	Foss O. Eldred	1946	Harry Kelly		
	Eugene F. Black	1947–1948	Republican		
	Stephen J. Roth	1949–1950	Democratic		
	Frank Millard	1951–1954	Republican		
	Thomas M. Kavanagh	1955–1957	Democratic	Resigned	
	Paul L. Adams	1958–1961	G. Mennen Williams		
	Paul L. Adams	1958–1961	Democratic	Resigned	
	Frank J. Kelley	1961–1998	John Swainson		
	Frank J. Kelley	1961–1998	Democratic		
	Jennifer Granholm	1999–2002	Democratic		
	Mike Cox	2003–2010	Republican		
	Bill Schuette	2011–2018	Republican		
	Dana Nessel	2019–present	Democratic		
