= Orville E. Atwood =

American politician and farmer (1880–1939)

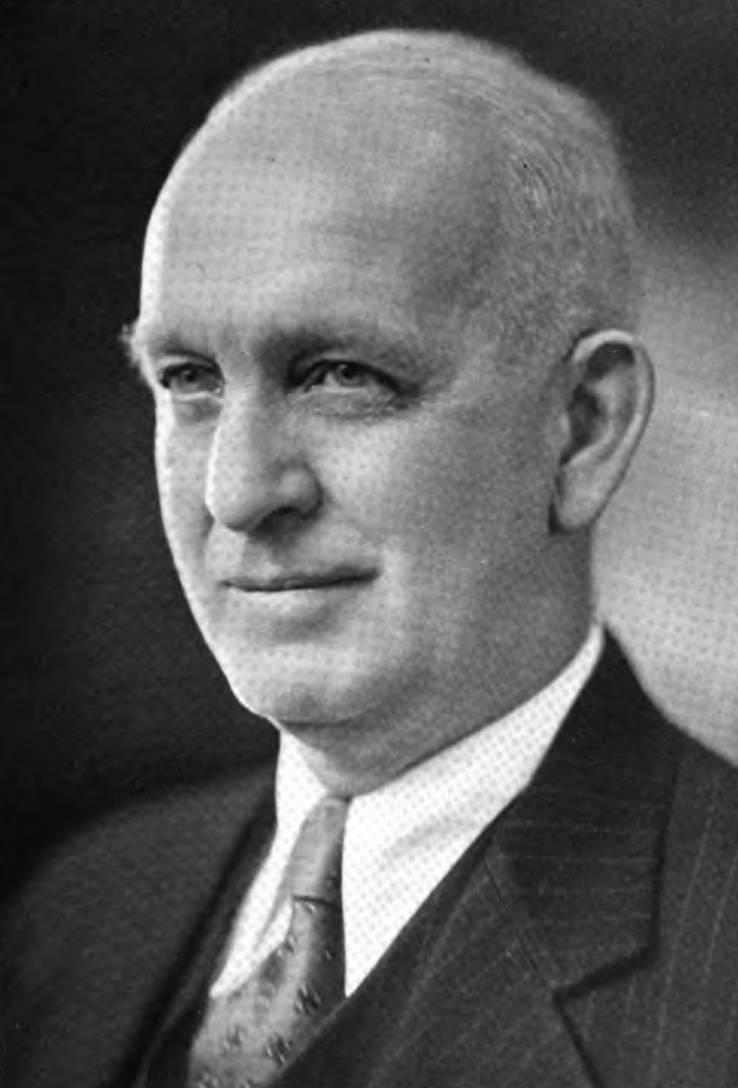

32nd Secretary of State of Michigan
- In office 1935–1937
- Governor: Frank Fitzgerald
- Preceded by: Clarke W. Brown
- Succeeded by: Leon D. Case

Member of the Michigan Senate from the 26th district
- In office January 2, 1929 – 1931
- Preceded by: Thomas Read
- In office January 3, 1923 – 1927
- Succeeded by: Thomas Read

Member of the Michigan House of Representatives from the Newaygo district
- In office January 1, 1919 – January 3, 1923

Personal details
- Born: Orville Elbridge Atwood Jr. February 23, 1880 near Morgan Park, Illinois, U.S.
- Died: June 15, 1939 (aged 59) Howell, Michigan, U.S.
- Resting place: Deepdale Memorial Park, Delta Charter Township, Michigan, U.S.
- Party: Republican
- Spouse: Evelyn May Forman (m. 1910)
- Children: 2
- Education: Ottawa Academy; University of Chicago
- Occupation: Politician, farmer

Orville Elbridge Atwood Jr. (February 23, 1880 – June 15, 1939) was an American politician and farmer who served as the 32nd secretary of state of Michigan from 1935 to 1937 as a member of the Republican Party. He previously served in both chambers of the Michigan Legislature.

== Early life and education ==
Atwood was born near Morgan Park, Illinois, on February 23, 1880, to Orville Elbridge Atwood Sr. and Martha Elvira (Townsend) Atwood.

Atwood moved to Kansas with his parents when he was 12 years old. He attended Ottawa Academy in Ottawa, Kansas, and subsequently graduated from the University of Chicago in 1903. While a student at the University of Chicago, Atwood was a member of the 1900 Chicago Maroons football team and the 1901 Chicago Maroons football team.

== Career ==
Atwood worked as a traveling salesman for two years before moving to a farm near Newaygo, Michigan.

Atwood was an alternate delegate to the Republican National Convention from Michigan in 1924.

Atwood served as director of the Michigan Sales Tax Division in 1939.

=== Michigan Legislature ===
A member of the Republican Party, Atwood served five sessions in the Michigan Legislature. He was first elected to the Michigan House of Representatives in 1918. Atwood served in this chamber from 1919 to 1923, representing the Newaygo district in the 50th and 51st Michigan Legislatures.

In 1922, Atwood was elected to the Michigan Senate. He served in this chamber from 1923 to 1927, representing Michigan's 26th Senate district in the 52nd and 53rd Michigan Legislatures. Atwood was narrowly defeated by Thomas Read in the 1926 Republican primary election. However, Atwood subsequently defeated Read in another close race, after which he served his third and final term in the Michigan Senate from 1929 to 1931 in the 55th Michigan Legislature.

=== Michigan Secretary of State ===
Atwood served as the 32nd secretary of state of Michigan from 1935 to 1937. His 1934 victory was unsuccessfully contested by Democratic Party nominee Guy M. Wilson.

In 1935, during his tenure as secretary of state, Atwood criticized Thomas Ward, a Democratic employee of the state liquor control commission, characterizing Ward as a "troublemaker" and threatening to demand that chairman John S. McDonald dismiss him. In response, McDonald stated: "If Orville comes blustering out of the commission, I'll throw him out. Orville has an office of his own to run and I suggest that he keeps his nose out of liquor commission business." McDonald further stated that his decision to retain or dismiss Ward would not be influenced by Atwood.

In 1936, Atwood spoke at a rally in support of Republican Michigan Governor Frank Fitzgerald's re-election bid, stating: "The issue is whether American ideas are to continue or whether we are to adopt European regimentation and collectivism. This is the most important election in our lifetime." Fitzgerald went on to lose the 1936 Michigan gubernatorial election to Democrat Frank Murphy. Atwood also lost his own re-election bid that year.

Atwood was preceded in office by Republican Clarke W. Brown and succeeded by Democrat Leon D. Case.

== Personal life ==
Atwood married Evelyn May Forman on October 1, 1910. He had two children. Atwood's wife was active in Republican women's affairs.

Atwood was a member of the Freemasons and Delta Upsilon. He was a Congregationalist and had English ancestry.

In 1931, Atwood, who was head of the Michigan state auto license bureau at the time, fatally struck nine-year-old Marylin Reuss with his automobile. According to witnesses, Atwood stopped immediately and administered as much aid as he could. Atwood was charged with assault in connection with the incident and released on a bond of $10,000. The bond was later dismissed following witness testimony, and Atwood was exonerated of any wrongdoing in the incident.

== Death ==
On June 15, 1939, Atwood was traveling from Lansing to Detroit with auto executive Frank Longyear when they collided with a westbound bus. Atwood, aged 59, died from his injuries an hour later in McPherson Hospital in Howell, Michigan. Longyear was also killed as a result of the collision. Additionally, four passengers on the bus were injured, including state representative Martin R. Kronk.

Atwood was interred at Deepdale Memorial Park in Delta Charter Township, Michigan.

Michigan House of Representatives
| Preceded by — | Member of the Michigan House of Representatives from the Newaygo district 1919–1923 | Succeeded by — |
Michigan Senate
| Preceded by — | Member of the Michigan Senate from the 26th district 1923–1927 | Succeeded by Thomas Read |
| Preceded by Thomas Read | Member of the Michigan Senate from the 26th district 1929–1931 | Succeeded by — |
Political offices
| Preceded by Clarke W. Brown | Secretary of State of Michigan; 1935–1937 | Succeeded by Leon D. Case |
