= Leon D. Case =

American politician (1877–1939)

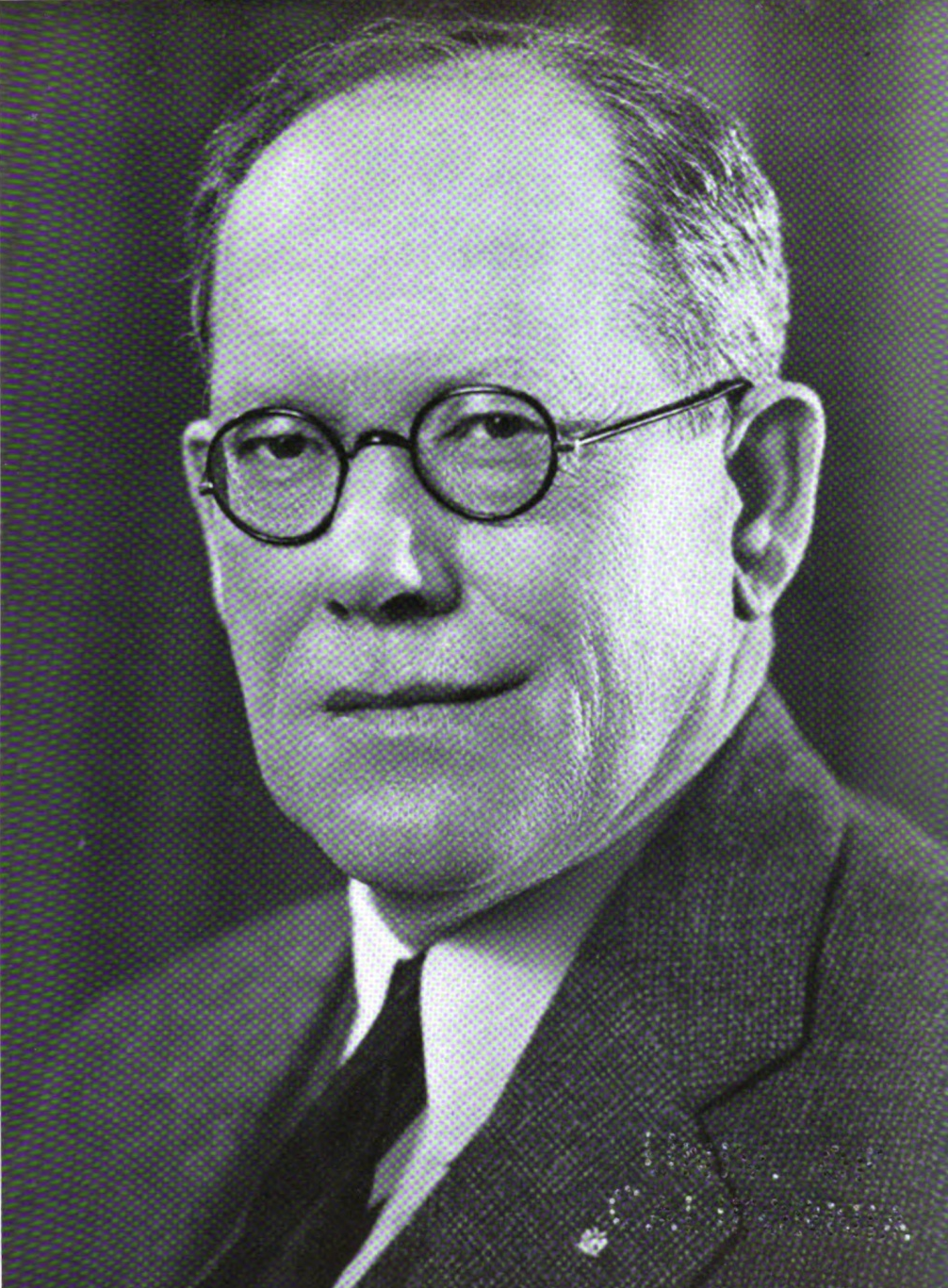
- Case c. 1939

33rd Secretary of State of Michigan
- In office 1937–1939
- Governor: Frank Fitzgerald
- Preceded by: Orville E. Atwood
- Succeeded by: Harry Kelly

Member of the Michigan Senate from the 7th district
- In office 1933–1936
- In office 1913–1914

Personal details
- Born: Leon Donald Case; January 15, 1877 Ellsworth, Wisconsin, U.S.
- Died: July 6, 1939 (aged 62) Milwaukee, Wisconsin, U.S.
- Party: Democratic
- Occupation: Politician

Leon Donald Case (January 15, 1877 – July 6, 1939) was a politician in Michigan.

== Biography ==
Case was born Leon Donald Case in Ellsworth, Wisconsin, on January 15, 1877.

== Career ==
Case was twice a member of the Michigan Senate, where he represented the 7th district. First serving from 1913 to 1914, and, after unsuccessfully running in 1928, serving again from 1933 to 1936. In 1936, he was a candidate for the Democratic nomination for Lieutenant Governor of Michigan to run on the gubernatorial ticket with Frank Murphy, losing to Leo J. Nowicki. Later, he was Michigan Secretary of State from 1937 to 1938.

Case died in Milwaukee at the age of 62.

Political offices
Preceded by Orville E. Atwood	Secretary of State of Michigan; 1937–1939	Succeeded by Harry F. Kelly
