= John Wesley Fitzgerald (politician, born 1850) =

American businessman and politician

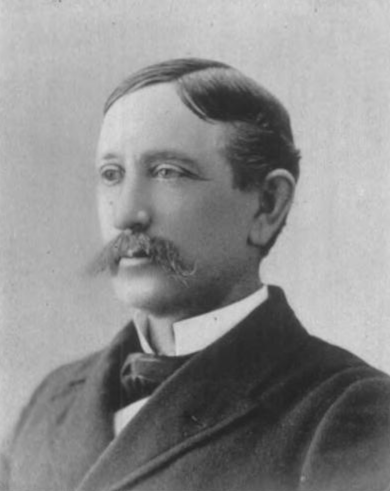

Member of the Michigan House of Representatives
- In office 1895–1896

Personal details
- Born: October 22, 1850 Montpelier, Vermont
- Died: February 3, 1908 (aged 57) Grand Ledge, Michigan
- Party: Republican
- Children: Frank D. Fitzgerald
- Occupation: Businessman, politician

John Wesley Fitzgerald (October 22, 1850 – February 3, 1908) was an American businessman and politician.

== Biography ==
Born in Montpelier, Vermont, he lived in Lyons, New York after his parents died. He went to Sodus Academy in Sodus, New York and was certified a school teacher. He settled in Grand Ledge, Michigan, where he taught school, worked on a farm, and in a hardware store. He helped organized the Grand Ledge Sewer Pipe Company and a chair factory. He served in the Michigan House of Representatives in 1895–1896 as a Republican. He also served on the Grand Ledge School Board and was postmaster there. He died in Grand Ledge on February 3, 1908.

His son was Frank D. Fitzgerald who served as Governor of Michigan. His grandson was John Warner Fitzgerald who served on the Michigan Supreme Court; his great-grandson was Frank M. Fitzgerald who also served in the Michigan House of Representatives; his great-great-grandson and namesake is John Wesley Fitzgerald, a State Representative in the 102nd Michigan Legislature.
