= 1938 Michigan gubernatorial election =

- November 8, 1938
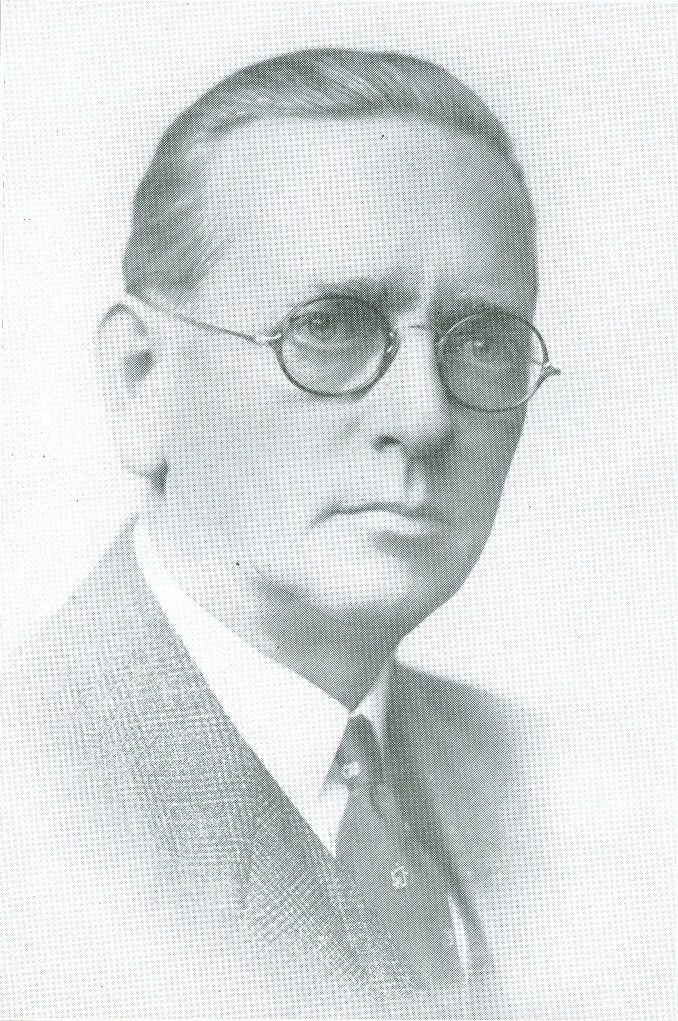

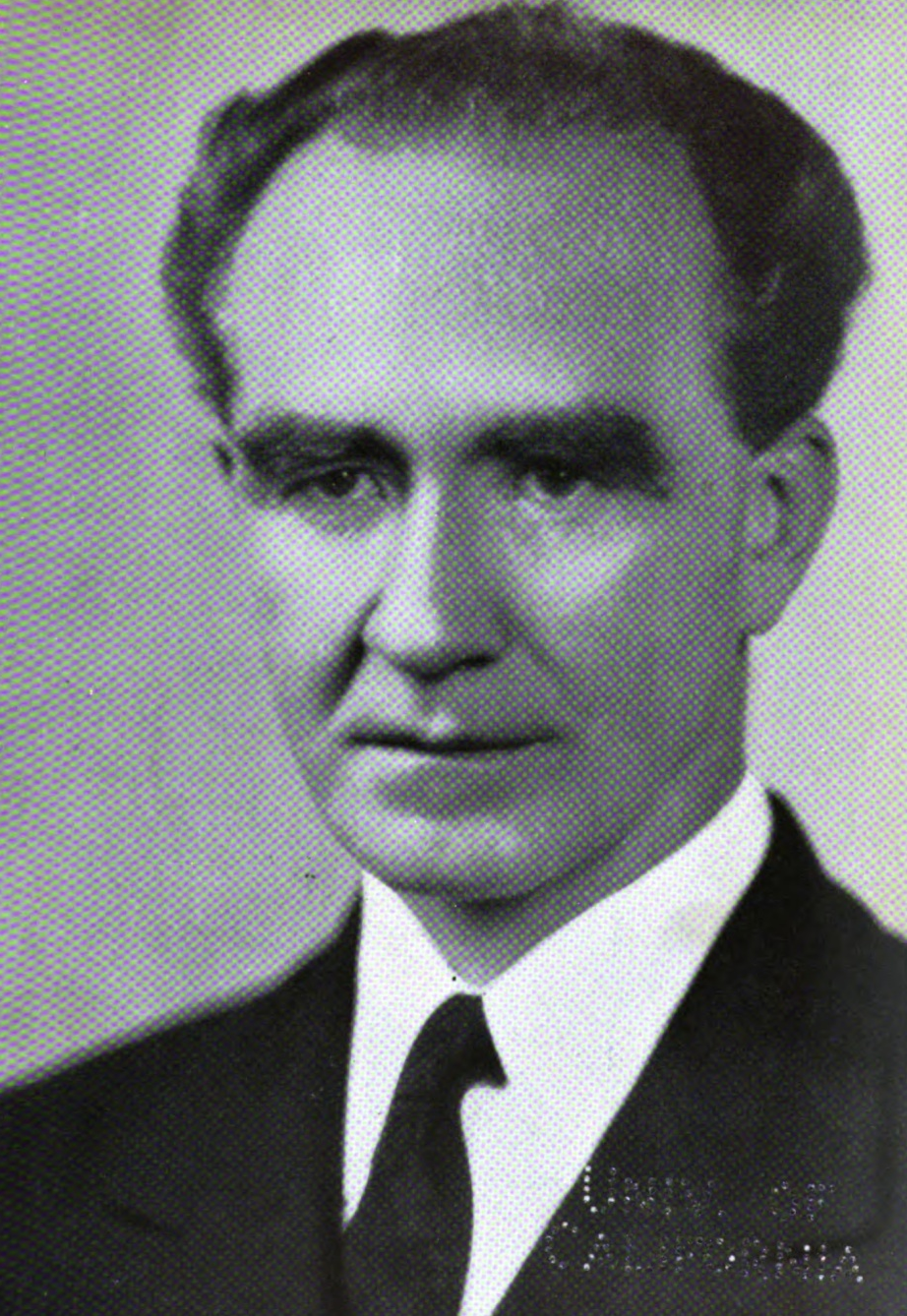
Nominee	Frank Fitzgerald	Frank Murphy
Party	Republican	Democratic
Popular vote	847,245	753,752
Percentage	52.78%	46.96%
- County results Fitzgerald: 50–60% 60–70% 70–80% 80–90% Murphy: 50–60% 60–70%
Governor before election
Frank Murphy
Democratic
Elected Governor
Frank Fitzgerald
Republican

The 1938 Michigan gubernatorial election was held on November 8, 1938. In a rematch of the previous election, Republican nominee Frank Fitzgerald this time defeated incumbent Democratic Frank Murphy with 52.78% of the vote. This was the fourth of six consecutive gubernatorial elections in Michigan in which the incumbent party was defeated.

== Primary election ==
Michigan held primary elections on September 13, 1938.

=== Democratic party ===
Incumbent governor Frank Murphy was renominated without opposition.

==== Candidates ====
- Frank Murphy, incumbent governor

==== Results ====
Democratic primary results
Party	Candidate	Votes	%
Democratic	Frank Murphy (inc.)	336,199	99.96%
Democratic	Scattering	151	0.04%
Total votes		336,350	100.00%

=== Republican party ===
Former governor Frank Fitzgerald was renominated despite having lost the previous election.

==== Candidates ====
- Roscoe Conkling Fitch, publisher from Detroit and candidate for Republican nomination in 1936
- Frank Fitzgerald, former governor
- Harry S. Toy, former Justice of the Michigan Supreme Court

==== Results ====
Republican primary results
Party	Candidate	Votes	%
Republican	Frank Fitzgerald	420,188	65.45%
Republican	Harry S. Toy	207,543	32.33%
Republican	Roscoe Conkling Fitch	14,253	2.22%
Republican	Scattering	24	0.00%
Total votes		642,008	100.00%

== General election ==
=== Candidates ===
Major party candidates

- Frank Fitzgerald, Republican
- Frank Murphy, Democratic

Other candidates

- Nahum Burnett, Socialist
- Clayton O'Donohue, Socialist Labor
- Juliet K. Hammond, American
- Vahan K. Beshgetoor, Commonwealth
- Howard L. Holmes, Square Deal
- Bowen R. Gover, Protestants United

=== Results ===
1938 Michigan gubernatorial election
Party	Candidate	Votes	%	±%
Republican	Frank Fitzgerald	847,245	52.78%	+4.55%
Democratic	Frank Murphy (inc.)	753,752	46.96%	−4.07%
Socialist	Nahum Burnett	2,896	0.18%	−0.20%
Socialist Labor	Clayton O'Donohue	446	0.03%	+0.00%
American	Juliet K. Hammond	257	0.02%	
Commonwealth	Vahan K. Beshgetoor	242	0.02%	−0.01%
Square Deal	Howard L. Holmes	205	0.01%	
Protestants United	Bowen R. Gover	177	0.01%	
	Scattering	21	0.00%	
Majority		93,493	5.82%	
Total votes		1,605,241	100.00%	
Republican gain from Democratic		Swing	+8.62%	

==== Results by county ====
Keweenaw County voted Democratic for the first time since 1870. Additionally, Fitzgerald was the first Republican to be elected governor without carrying Houghton County and Marquette County since John J. Bagley in 1874.

County	Frank Fitzgerald Republican		Frank Murphy Democratic		Nahum Burnett Socialist		All Others Various		Margin		Total votes cast
County	#	%	#	%	#	%	#	%	#	%	Total votes cast
Alcona	1,396	66.32%	702	33.35%	6	0.29%	1	0.05%	694	32.97%	2,105
Alger	1,477	35.87%	2,632	63.91%	7	0.17%	2	0.05%	-1,155	-28.05%	4,118
Allegan	8,928	71.58%	3,488	27.96%	52	0.42%	5	0.04%	5,440	43.61%	12,473
Alpena	3,609	63.08%	2,103	36.76%	7	0.12%	2	0.03%	1,506	26.32%	5,721
Antrim	2,411	67.80%	1,132	31.83%	8	0.22%	5	0.14%	1,279	35.97%	3,556
Arenac	1,992	58.03%	1,432	41.71%	6	0.17%	3	0.09%	560	16.31%	3,433
Baraga	1,989	46.77%	2,262	53.19%	2	0.05%	0	0.00%	-273	-6.42%	4,253
Barry	5,372	70.55%	2,229	29.28%	7	0.09%	6	0.08%	3,143	41.28%	7,614
Bay	11,466	49.50%	11,657	50.33%	31	0.13%	8	0.03%	-191	-0.82%	23,162
Benzie	1,978	62.61%	1,172	37.10%	8	0.25%	1	0.03%	806	25.51%	3,159
Berrien	18,003	59.21%	12,360	40.65%	29	0.10%	15	0.05%	5,643	18.56%	30,407
Branch	6,570	68.45%	3,002	31.28%	18	0.19%	8	0.08%	3,568	37.17%	9,598
Calhoun	16,640	57.27%	12,305	42.35%	75	0.26%	37	0.13%	4,335	14.92%	29,057
Cass	5,817	62.50%	3,475	37.34%	5	0.05%	10	0.11%	2,342	25.16%	9,307
Charlevoix	2,957	63.82%	1,666	35.96%	6	0.13%	4	0.09%	1,291	27.87%	4,633
Cheboygan	3,221	57.67%	2,359	42.24%	3	0.05%	2	0.04%	862	15.43%	5,585
Chippewa	5,395	53.67%	4,638	46.14%	8	0.08%	11	0.11%	757	7.53%	10,052
Clare	2,550	71.55%	1,005	28.20%	4	0.11%	5	0.14%	1,545	43.35%	3,564
Clinton	6,175	71.49%	2,452	28.39%	8	0.09%	3	0.03%	3,723	43.10%	8,638
Crawford	819	57.64%	601	42.29%	1	0.07%	0	0.00%	218	15.34%	1,421
Delta	5,483	42.01%	7,548	57.83%	16	0.12%	6	0.05%	-2,065	-15.82%	13,053
Dickinson	5,666	46.88%	6,388	52.85%	16	0.13%	17	0.14%	-722	-5.97%	12,087
Eaton	8,607	66.71%	4,242	32.88%	42	0.33%	12	0.09%	4,365	33.83%	12,903
Emmet	3,495	63.35%	2,007	36.38%	9	0.16%	6	0.11%	1,488	26.97%	5,517
Genesee	36,115	50.47%	35,301	49.34%	113	0.16%	22	0.03%	814	1.14%	71,551
Gladwin	2,159	68.69%	983	31.28%	1	0.03%	0	0.00%	1,176	37.42%	3,143
Gogebic	6,239	44.15%	7,853	55.58%	25	0.18%	13	0.09%	-1,614	-11.42%	14,130
Grand Traverse	4,490	64.01%	2,515	35.86%	8	0.11%	1	0.01%	1,975	28.16%	7,014
Gratiot	6,434	70.00%	27,15	29.54%	6	0.07%	36	0.39%	3,719	40.46%	9,191
Hillsdale	7,483	73.80%	2,623	25.87%	24	0.24%	9	0.09%	4,860	47.93%	10,139
Houghton	8,927	46.24%	10,363	53.68%	9	0.05%	6	0.03%	-1,436	-7.44%	19,305
Huron	7,676	68.01%	3,569	31.62%	22	0.19%	20	0.18%	4,107	36.39%	11,287
Ingham	24,332	55.93%	18,986	43.64%	148	0.34%	39	0.09%	5,346	12.29%	43,505
Ionia	7,911	62.62%	4,704	37.24%	9	0.07%	9	0.07%	3,207	25.39%	12,633
Iosco	2,119	63.92%	1,189	35.87%	4	0.12%	3	0.09%	930	28.05%	3,315
Iron	4,529	50.42%	4,440	49.43%	9	0.10%	4	0.04%	89	0.99%	8,982
Isabella	4,808	68.95%	2,141	30.70%	12	0.17%	12	0.17%	2,667	38.25%	6,973
Jackson	19,005	60.05%	12,547	39.64%	66	0.21%	33	0.10%	6,458	20.40%	31,651
Kalamazoo	18,816	65.13%	10,009	34.65%	21	0.07%	44	0.15%	8,807	30.48%	28,890
Kalkaska	921	58.25%	651	41.18%	7	0.44%	2	0.13%	270	17.08%	1,581
Kent	36,430	52.25%	32,964	47.28%	225	0.32%	108	0.15%	3,466	4.97%	69,727
Keweenaw	927	45.85%	1,093	54.06%	1	0.05%	1	0.05%	-166	-8.21%	2,022
Lake	1,266	57.49%	929	42.19%	6	0.27%	1	0.05%	337	15.30%	2,202
Lapeer	7,051	76.58%	2,140	23.24%	10	0.11%	6	0.07%	4,911	53.34%	9,207
Leelanau	2,055	67.84%	968	31.96%	3	0.10%	3	0.10%	1,087	35.89%	3,029
Lenawee	13,611	74.81%	4,541	24.96%	28	0.15%	15	0.08%	9,070	49.85%	18,195
Livingston	6,791	71.95%	2,614	27.70%	28	0.30%	5	0.05%	4,177	44.26%	9,438
Luce	1,416	60.28%	931	39.63%	0	0.00%	2	0.09%	485	20.65%	2,349
Mackinac	2,153	51.63%	2,009	48.18%	2	0.05%	6	0.14%	144	3.45%	4,170
Macomb	15,669	51.73%	14,554	48.05%	46	0.15%	23	0.08%	1,115	3.68%	30,292
Manistee	4,082	55.23%	3,291	44.53%	14	0.19%	4	0.05%	791	10.70%	7,391
Marquette	8,444	44.21%	10,626	55.63%	23	0.12%	7	0.04%	-2,182	-11.42%	19,100
Mason	3,751	54.44%	3,116	45.22%	15	0.22%	8	0.12%	635	9.22%	6,890
Mecosta	3,358	64.88%	1,806	34.89%	4	0.08%	8	0.15%	1,552	29.98%	5,176
Menominee	4,492	49.15%	4,632	50.68%	10	0.11%	6	0.07%	-140	-1.53%	9,140
Midland	5,004	67.00%	2,441	32.68%	18	0.24%	6	0.08%	2,563	34.32%	7,469
Missaukee	2,013	66.74%	998	33.09%	4	0.13%	1	0.03%	1,015	33.65%	3,016
Monroe	12,088	61.69%	7,475	38.15%	13	0.07%	20	0.10%	4,613	23.54%	19,596
Montcalm	5,730	66.86%	2,802	32.70%	31	0.36%	7	0.08%	2,928	34.17%	8,570
Montmorency	1,187	61.47%	730	37.80%	8	0.41%	6	0.31%	457	23.67%	1,931
Muskegon	10,634	46.01%	12,392	53.62%	56	0.24%	30	0.13%	-1,758	-7.61%	23,112
Newaygo	4,002	67.04%	1,951	32.68%	13	0.22%	4	0.07%	2,051	34.36%	5,970
Oakland	37,975	56.89%	28,578	42.81%	156	0.23%	46	0.07%	9,397	14.08%	66,755
Oceana	2,955	63.74%	1,664	35.89%	11	0.24%	6	0.13%	1,291	27.85%	4,636
Ogemaw	2,162	63.76%	1,223	36.07%	2	0.06%	4	0.12%	939	27.69%	3,391
Ontonagon	2,723	47.52%	2,999	52.34%	8	0.14%	0	0.00%	-276	-4.82%	5,730
Osceola	3,213	72.59%	1,200	27.11%	6	0.14%	7	0.16%	2,013	45.48%	4,426
Oscoda	607	64.78%	329	35.11%	1	0.11%	0	0.00%	278	29.67%	937
Otsego	1,340	58.49%	943	41.16%	5	0.22%	3	0.13%	397	17.33%	2,291
Ottawa	10,849	62.00%	6,608	37.76%	35	0.20%	6	0.03%	4,241	24.24%	17,498
Presque Isle	2,208	47.88%	2,397	51.97%	4	0.09%	3	0.07%	-189	-4.10%	4,612
Roscommon	1,328	72.73%	494	27.05%	4	0.22%	0	0.00%	834	45.67%	1,826
Saginaw	21,662	54.76%	17,769	44.92%	89	0.23%	35	0.09%	3,893	9.84%	39,555
Sanilac	8,454	81.45%	1,909	18.39%	13	0.13%	4	0.04%	6,545	63.05%	10,380
Schoolcraft	1,923	50.58%	1,872	49.24%	5	0.13%	2	0.05%	51	1.34%	3,802
Shiawassee	8,782	67.81%	4,110	31.74%	45	0.35%	14	0.11%	4,672	36.07%	12,951
St. Clair	15,371	65.89%	7,921	33.95%	24	0.10%	12	0.05%	7,450	31.94%	23,328
St. Joseph	7,883	71.01%	3,187	28.71%	25	0.23%	7	0.06%	4,696	42.30%	11,102
Tuscola	8,422	78.78%	2,250	21.05%	12	0.11%	6	0.06%	6,172	57.74%	10,690
Van Buren	9,318	67.67%	4,417	32.08%	30	0.22%	5	0.04%	4,901	35.59%	13,770
Washtenaw	16,660	69.40%	7,296	30.39%	37	0.15%	13	0.05%	9,364	39.01%	24,006
Wayne	233,885	41.67%	325,982	58.08%	954	0.17%	470	0.08%	-92,097	-16.41%	561,291
Wexford	3,391	60.92%	2,155	38.72%	14	0.25%	6	0.11%	1,236	22.21%	5,566
Total	847,245	52.78%	753,752	46.96%	2,896	0.18%	1,348	0.08%	93,493	5.82%	1,605,241

===== Counties that flipped from Democratic to Republican =====
- Calhoun
- Genesee
- Ingham
- Iron
- Kent
- Macomb
- Manistee
- Mason
- Saginaw
- Schoolcraft

===== Counties that flipped from Republican to Democratic =====
- Baraga
- Keweenaw
