= John Warner Fitzgerald =

American judge

John W. Fitzgerald
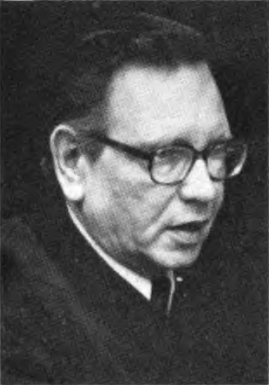

58th Chief Justice of the Michigan Supreme Court
- In office 1982–1982
- Preceded by: Mary S. Coleman
- Succeeded by: G. Mennen Williams

Associate Justice of the Michigan Supreme Court
- In office 1973–1982
- Preceded by: Thomas E. Brennan

Member of the Michigan Senate from the 15th district
- In office January 1, 1959 – December 31, 1964
- Preceded by: Donald E. Smith
- Succeeded by: Sander Levin

Personal details
- Born: November 14, 1924 Grand Ledge, Michigan
- Died: July 7, 2006 (aged 81) St. Ignace, Michigan
- Party: Republican
- Relations: John Wesley Fitzgerald (grandfather); John W. Fitzgerald (grandson)
- Children: Frank M. Fitzgerald
- Parent: Frank D. Fitzgerald (father)
- Education: University of Michigan Law School; Michigan State University

Military service
- Allegiance: United States
- Branch/service: United States Army
- Battles/wars: World War II

John Warner Fitzgerald (November 14, 1924–July 7, 2006) was an American lawyer, member of the Michigan Senate, and justice (and later chief justice) of the Michigan Supreme Court.

== Life ==
Fitzgerald was born in Grand Ledge, Michigan, on November 14, 1924. He was born to a political family; he was the grandson of John Wesley Fitzgerald, a Michigan state representative from Eaton County (1895–96) and the son of Frank Dwight Fitzgerald, governor of Michigan from 1935 to 1936 and 1939, and Queena Warner Fitzgerald.

Fitzgerald graduated from Grand Ledge High School in 1942. Fitzgerald served in the U.S. Army infantry during World War II. He received his undergraduate degree from Michigan State University in 1947 and his law degree from the University of Michigan Law School in 1954. He also studied at Princeton University and the University of Arizona.

Fitzgerald was the legal counsel for the Michigan State Senate from 1955 until 1958. In 1958, Fitzgerald was elected to the Michigan State Senate, where he served until 1962.

Fitzgerald practiced in the law firm of Fitzgerald & Wirbel until he was elected to the Michigan Court of Appeals in 1964. Governor William Milliken appointed Fitzgerald to a one-year term on the Michigan Supreme Court in 1973. Fitzgerald took his seat on January 1, 1974. Fitzgerald was subsequently elected to a full eight-year term, and in his final year on the bench, in 1982, he was elected chief justice.

Fitzgerald was a member of the original board of directors of Thomas M. Cooley Law School, and also taught as an adjunct, teaching the first property-law class there in 1983. He later resigned from the board to become a full-time professor of law there.

Fitzgerald died on July 7, 2006, at Mackinac Straits Hospital in St. Ignace, after a long illness, at age 81. The Fitzgerald family has had a cottage on the Mackinac Island's East Bluff since 1961.

Fitzgerald was a member of the First Congregational, United Church of Christ of Grand Ledge and the Little Stone Church, Union Congregational on Mackinac Island. He was also a member of the Mackinac Island Yacht Club and a charter member of Mackinac Associates.

Fitzgerald's papers are archived at the Bentley Historical Library of the University of Michigan.
