= Clarke W. Brown =

American politician

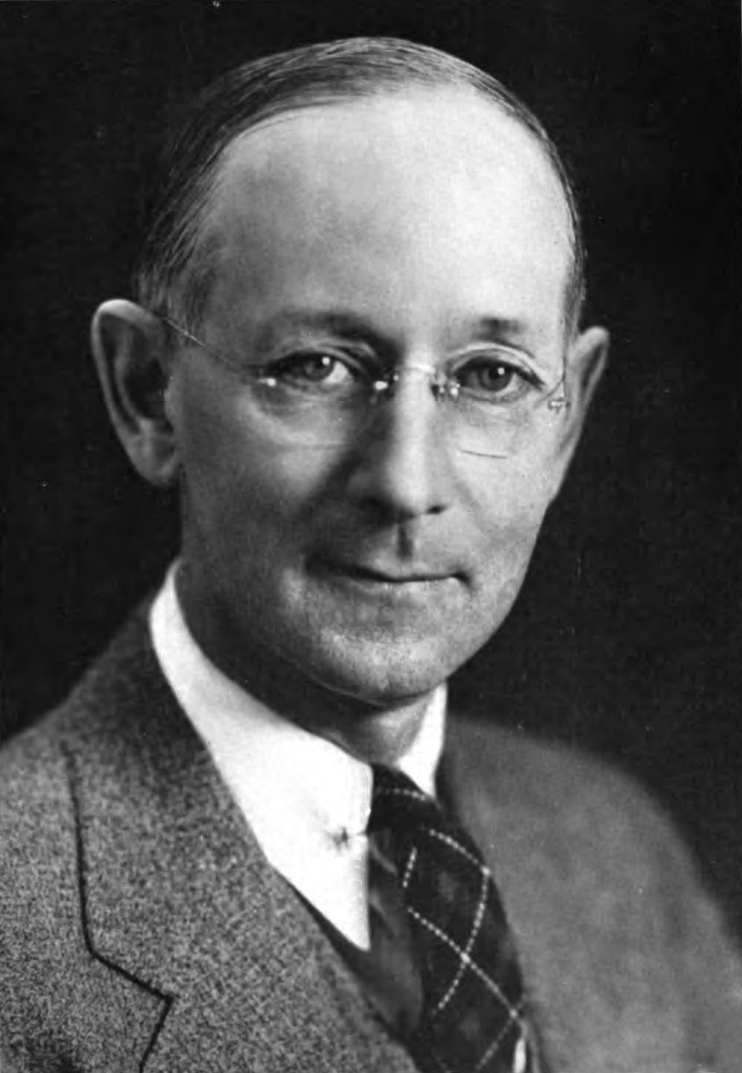

Michigan Secretary of State
- In office November 15, 1934 – January 1, 1935
- Governor: William Comstock
- Preceded by: Frank Fitzgerald
- Succeeded by: Orville E. Atwood

Personal details
- Died: May 24, 1956 Roscommon, Michigan, U.S.
- Party: Republican

Clarke W. Brown Sr. (died May 24, 1956) was an American politician who served as the 31st Secretary of State of Michigan for a short period at the end of 1934 as a member of the Republican Party.

== Career ==
In 1934, Michigan Secretary of State Frank Fitzgerald was elected Governor of Michigan. On November 13, Governor-elect Fitzgerald resigned as secretary of state. The resignation was effective November 15. Fitzgerald had made prior arrangements with Governor William Comstock, that after Fitzgerald's resignation, Clarke W. Brown, the deputy secretary of state who had held the office for over 25 years, be appointed to fill the vacancy until the newly elected secretary of state took office on January 1, 1935. Brown lived in Lansing at the time. Brown was appointed by Governor Comstock, as planned, on November 15, and was sworn in to the position the same day. Shortly after being sworn in, Brown appointed Secretary of State-elect Orville E. Atwood as deputy secretary of state, and Atwood was sworn in as deputy secretary on November 15 as well. Brown was a Republican.

On January 15, 1935, Brown was appointed by the Michigan public utilities commission as secretary of the commission.

== Personal life ==
Brown's wife died on November 5, 1940. Together, they had two children.

== Death ==
Brown died of a heart attack in his home in Roscommon, Michigan, on May 24, 1956.
