= Frank M. Fitzgerald =

American politician

Member of the Michigan House of Representatives
- In office January 1, 1987 – December 31, 1998
- Preceded by: Ernest W. Nash
- Succeeded by: Susan Tabor
- Constituency: 56th district (1987–1992); 71st district (1993–1998)

Personal details
- Born: November 11, 1955 Grand Ledge, Michigan, United States
- Died: December 9, 2004 (aged 49)
- Party: Republican
- Spouse: Ruth
- Children: John
- Relatives: John Wesley Fitzgerald (great-grandfather); Frank Fitzgerald (grandfather); John Warner Fitzgerald (father)
- Education: Cooley Law School; College of William and Mary

Frank Moore Fitzgerald (November 11, 1955 – December 9, 2004) was an American lawyer and politician.

Born in Grand Ledge, Michigan, Fitzgerald graduated from the College of William & Mary and received his law degree from Thomas M. Cooley Law School. He practiced law in Lansing, Michigan and was an assistant prosecuting attorney for Eaton County, Michigan. He served in the Michigan House of Representatives 1986–1998. He was appointed Michigan State Insurance Commissioner and later Commissioner of Michigan Office of Financial and Insurance Services. Fitzgerald died suddenly at LaGuardia Airport in New York City while on a business trip. His great-grandfather was John Wesley Fitzgerald, who also served in the Michigan House of Representatives, and his grandfather was Frank Dwight Fitzgerald, who served as Governor of Michigan, and his father was John Warner Fitzgerald who served on the Michigan Supreme Court.

Fitzgerald's son, John W. Fitzgerald, is a Democratic State Representative for the 83rd House District, which includes portions of the City of Grand Rapids and City of Wyoming.
