= Grand Ledge, Michigan =

- City
- Location of Grand Ledge in Eaton County, Michigan
- Coordinates: 42°45′12″N 84°44′42″W
- Country: United States
- State: Michigan
- Counties: Eaton, Clinton
- Established: 1871

Government
  - Mayor: Keith Mulder

Area
  - Total: 3.93 sq mi (10.19 km^{2})
  - Land: 3.84 sq mi (9.94 km^{2})
  - Water: 0.097 sq mi (0.25 km^{2})
- Elevation: 833 ft (254 m)

Population (2020)
  - Total: 7,784
  - Density: 2,028.7/sq mi (783.27/km^{2})
- Time zone: UTC-5 (Eastern (EST))
  - Summer (DST): UTC-4 (EDT)
- ZIP code: 48837
- Area code: 517
- FIPS code: 26-33420
- GNIS feature ID: 1626372
- Website: www.cityofgrandledge.com

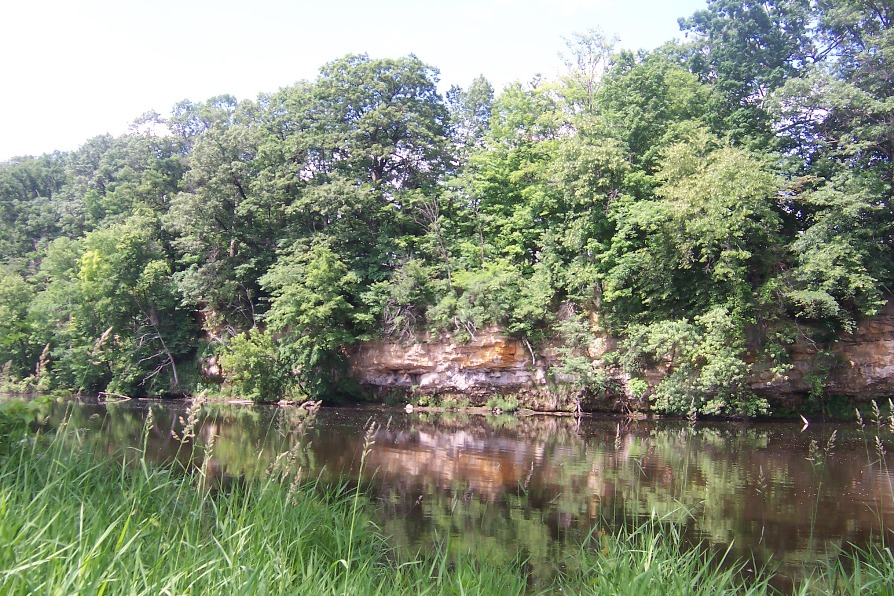
Sandstone ledges along the banks of the Grand Ledge

Grand Ledge is a city in the U.S. state of Michigan. The city lies mostly within Eaton County, though a small portion extends into Clinton County to the north (no residents live in that portion). The city sits along the Grand River 12.7 miles (20.4 kilometers) west of downtown Lansing. The population was 7,784 at the 2020 census. The city is named for its sandstone rock ledges that are located between island park and Fitzgerald park. They rise 40 feet (12 m) above the Grand River and are used by recreational rock climbers.

== History ==
=== Native American settlement ===
Native Americans who lived in the vicinity of the Grand River near the ledges were of Pottawatomi, Chippewa, and Ottawa ancestry. They dug clams in the river, mined coal on the river banks, hunted for deer, turkey, fox, and bear, and fished for black bass. Their name for the ledges translated into English as "Big Rocks".

=== Modern settlement ===
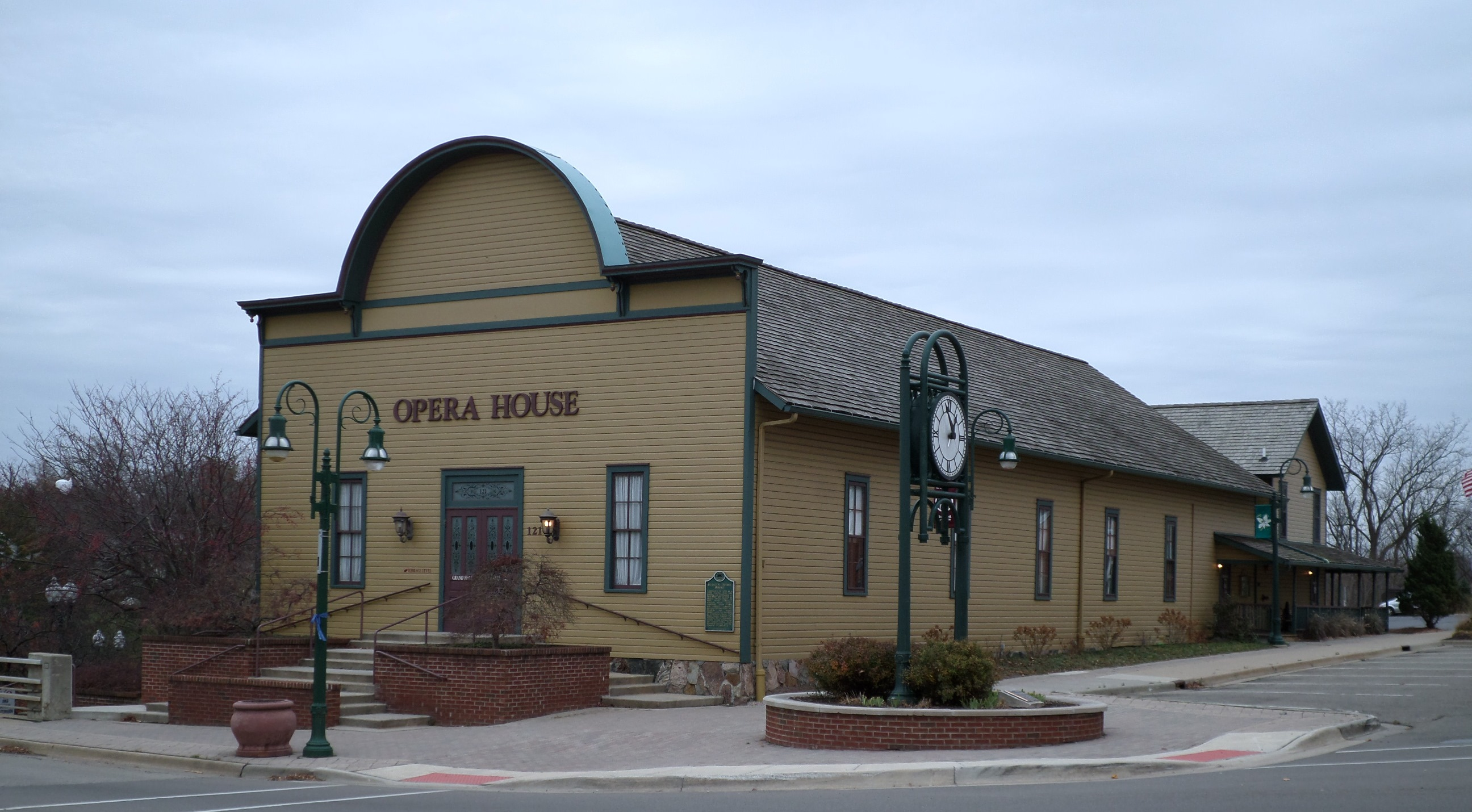
Grand Ledge Opera House

In 1847 Henry Trench settled in what would later become downtown Grand Ledge. After a few years he returned east. In 1850 settlers named their village Grand Ledge, and erected a post office. By 1869, the town gained a railroad stop along the Flint & Pere Marquette Railroad. In 1871, the village was incorporated by the state of Michigan.

==== Resort era ====
Grand Ledge grew as a resort area during the 1870s, spurred by the railroad access. John Burtch founded Seven Islands Resort in 1872, with the Dolly Varden steamer and a small inn on Second Island. Several wells were drilled, and the mineral-laden water they produced was touted for its curative property. In 1877 S.M. Hewings purchased the Seven Islands Resort, and in 1878 he built the Island House Hotel on Second Island. In 1880 Julian Scott Mudge purchased the Seven Islands Resort. To reduce the risk of flooding from Grand River, Mudge built a dam (1887). In 1888 the Railroad Trestle or High Bridge was built to bring the railroad south of the river and Grand Ledge became the second city in Michigan (after Lansing) to get electric lights. By that time an estimated 60,000 to 70,000 people visited the Seven Islands Resort annually.

=== Golden Age ===
In 1891 Mudge built a roller coaster on the Islands, probably the state's first. Located on the first island below the bridge was an animal park with bears and deer. The second island was the center of the resort activities, with its hotel, picnic area, and fountain. The second and third islands were joined with a causeway, and a pavilion served as a ballroom and theatre for Vaudeville acts. The Resort featured a merry-go-round and a bandstand.

Mudge's most notable improvement was the construction of “The Round House”. This three-story pagoda tower was built on the edge of Second Island, with half its foundation on island soil and the rest projecting over the river. During the construction, he kept the purpose of the unusual structure secret. This caused much speculation in the local community. Mudge eventually revealed that it was designed to have the second story rotate at a slow speed, while the third story rotated faster and was topped by a centrifugal swing that would whirl the adventurous rider out over the river.

The fourth, fifth, and sixth islands were left wild, and the seventh was a picnic spot, accessed by boat. As many as 75 boats plied the Grand River at Grand Ledge, and sidewheel riverboats ran between Second Island and the dam. The dam, constructed in 1887, ensured the proper water level for the operation of steamboats. As many as nine hotels provided accommodations for visitors and the Pere Marquette Railroad offered excursion rates to the Seven Island Resort which, according to early records, was second in popularity only to the Petoskey resort areas.

=== Spring flood of 1893 ===
A flood damaged the Round House in 1893. The construction was nearly complete by then, but the rushing waters pushed chunks of ice into its overhanging foundation. The structure was pushed off the foundation, but remained nearly in place, at a precarious angle. Although the building was saved, the mechanism that was to rotate its upper portions was so damaged that repairs were never initiated. The Round House remained on the site, becoming the most recognizable symbol of the entire resort era. “The building has come to be called Mudge’s Folly. This has a double meaning. While a folly can be a costly and foolish undertaking, it can also describe a picturesque structure built as an ornament, but without a real purpose.”.

=== Opera house ===
The increase in tourism and interest in roller skating led J. McPeek and Edgar Marvin to open the Riverside Rink on August 15, 1884. McPeek and Marvin went on to sell their shares to Peter Blake in early 1886. Blake commissioned artists and craftsmen to transform the space into an opera house. Blake bought the “Old Grange Hall” and moved it to the opera house, combining the structures to open “Sackett’s Opera House” on May 12, 1886. The Mackley-Salisbury Comedy Company was the opera house’s first feature act. The opera house went on to show early silent films, host talent shows, vaudeville acts, and athletic contests.

In 1928 the opera house was converted into a furniture store owned by Stephens Furniture and later Mapes Furniture. In 1976, the Bicentennial Committee used the space as their headquarters naming it “Heritage Hall”. In 1984 the Mapes family donated the building to the Grand Ledge Historical Society.

The main floor houses an antique Barton Theatre organ which was originally housed in the Michigan Theatre in Lansing, Michigan. The organ relocation and restoration was a partnership between the Lansing Theatre Organ Guild and The Opera House Authority. The Opera House is now operated as a space for weddings, receptions, and community events.

== Geography ==
According to the United States Census Bureau, the city has a total area of 3.65 square miles (9.45 km^{2}), of which 3.57 square miles (9.25 km^{2}) is land and 0.08 square miles (0.21 km^{2}) is water.

== Transportation ==
=== Highways ===
- M-43 – runs east to its intersection with Interstate 69, WNW of downtown Lansing.
- M-100 – runs north–south, to connect Grand Ledge with Interstate 69 on the south and Interstate 96 on the north.

=== Airport ===
Abrams Municipal Airport (FAA LID: 4D0) is a city-owned, public-use airport located two nautical miles (3.7 km) north of the central business district of Grand Ledge. The airport is accessible by road from Eaton Highway and is located 2.1 miles (3.4 km) south of Interstate 96, just east of M-100.

=== Railroads ===
CSX Transportation currently operates the original railroad built through the town as part of their Plymouth Subdivision between Plymouth, MI and Grand Rapids, MI. A small siding remains active for the local Lowe's distribution center. The remnant of a branch line to Ionia begins here to serve an ADM grain elevator several miles north of town. Today, one local freight train and two through freight trains pass through the town daily. Passenger service between Detroit and Grand Rapids, then provided by predecessor Chesapeake & Ohio, ended after April 30, 1971.

The railroad crosses the Grand River adjacent to the Ledges on a high bridge. One of the largest railroad bridges in the state of Michigan, it remains a sought after landmark for railfans and general tourists alike.

== Demographics ==
Historical population
Census	Pop.	Note	%±
1880	1,387		—
1890	1,606		15.8%
1900	2,161		34.6%
1910	2,893		33.9%
1920	3,043		5.2%
1930	3,572		17.4%
1940	3,899		9.2%
1950	4,506		15.6%
1960	5,165		14.6%
1970	6,032		16.8%
1980	6,920		14.7%
1990	7,579		9.5%
2000	7,813		3.1%
2010	7,786		−0.3%
2020	7,784		0.0%
U.S. Decennial Census

=== 2020 census ===
As of the 2020 census, Grand Ledge had a population of 7,784. The median age was 39.2 years. 22.3% of residents were under the age of 18 and 18.2% of residents were 65 years of age or older. For every 100 females there were 89.1 males, and for every 100 females age 18 and over there were 84.5 males age 18 and over.

There were 3,406 households in Grand Ledge, and there were 2,156 families residing in the city. Of all households, 28.8% had children under the age of 18 living in them, 41.3% were married-couple households, 18.1% were households with a male householder and no spouse or partner present, and 33.9% were households with a female householder and no spouse or partner present. About 34.0% of all households were made up of individuals and 13.9% had someone living alone who was 65 years of age or older.

There were 3,595 housing units, of which 5.3% were vacant. The homeowner vacancy rate was 1.4% and the rental vacancy rate was 6.5%. 99.9% of residents lived in urban areas, while 0.1% lived in rural areas.

Racial composition as of the 2020 census
Race	Number	Percent
White	6,968	89.5%
Black or African American	114	1.5%
American Indian and Alaska Native	35	0.4%
Asian	40	0.5%
Native Hawaiian and Other Pacific Islander	1	0.0%
Some other race	85	1.1%
Two or more races	541	7.0%
Hispanic or Latino (of any race)	453	5.8%

=== 2010 census ===
As of the census of 2010, there were 7,786 people, 3,357 households, and 2,063 families residing in the city. The population density was 2,181.0 inhabitants per square mile (842.1/km^{2}). There were 3,656 housing units at an average density of 1,024.1 per square mile (395.4/km^{2}). The racial makeup of the city was 94.4% White, 0.9% African American, 0.5% Native American, 0.8% Asian, 0.1% Pacific Islander, 0.9% from other races, and 2.5% from two or more races. Hispanic or Latino of any race were 4.6% of the population.

There were 3,357 households, of which 31.9% had children under the age of 18 living with them, 43.1% were married couples living together, 13.6% had a female householder with no husband present, 4.7% had a male householder with no wife present, and 38.5% were non-families. 33.1% of all households were made up of individuals, and 13.5% had someone living alone who was 65 years of age or older. The average household size was 2.31 and the average family size was 2.93.

The median age in the city was 38.8 years. 24.3% of residents were under the age of 18; 9% were between the ages of 18 and 24; 25.7% were from 25 to 44; 27% were from 45 to 64; 14.1% were 65 years of age or older. The gender makeup of the city was 47.7% male and 52.3% female.

=== 2000 census ===
As of the census of 2000, there were 7,813 people, 3,262 households, and 2,123 families residing in the city. The population density was 2,199.2 inhabitants per square mile (849.1/km^{2}). There were 3,405 housing units at an average density of 958.4 per square mile (370.0/km^{2}). The racial makeup of the city was 96.33% White, 0.44% African American, 0.40% Native American, 0.58% Asian, 0.03% Pacific Islander, 0.78% from other races, and 1.46% from two or more races. Hispanic or Latino of any race were 2.61% of the population.

There were 3,262 households, out of which 33.9% had children under the age of 18 living with them, 48.2% were married couples living together, 13.0% had a female householder with no husband present, and 34.9% were non-families. 29.0% of all households were made up of individuals, and 9.6% had someone living alone who was 65 years of age or older. The average household size was 2.39 and the average family size was 2.95.

In the city, the population was spread out, with 26.2% under the age of 18, 8.5% from 18 to 24, 31.5% from 25 to 44, 22.9% from 45 to 64, and 10.9% who were 65 years of age or older. The median age was 35 years. For every 100 females, there were 92.2 males. For every 100 females age 18 and over, there were 87.3 males.

The median income for a household in the city was $47,043, and the median income for a family was $55,727. Males had a median income of $44,255 versus $29,503 for females. The per capita income for the city was $22,438. About 6.3% of families and 9.3% of the population were below the poverty line, including 12.5% of those under age 18 and 7.8% of those age 65 or over.

== Education & Athletics ==
The Grand Ledge Public Schools district was established in 1886. It comprises an area of 125 square miles (320 km^{2}) centered 10 miles (16 km) west of Lansing, Michigan's state capital. Within the school district are the City of Grand Ledge, the communities of Delta Mills, Mulliken, Wacousta and Eagle, as well as a large portion of Delta Township. The school district, which is mainly in Eaton County, also covers portions of Clinton and Ionia Counties. The schools of Grand Ledge district consists of two early childhood centers, four elementary schools, one intermediate school, one middle school, and one high school. The Grand Ledge High School mascot is the Comet, and the school colors are navy blue and gold. The high school has the largest student enrollment in the Lansing area. The total population of the district is 31,000.

Grand Ledge is well known for their historic high school baseball program, which won state titles in 1977 and 1995 under legendary head coach Pat O'Keefe. They have also won a state title in boys' golf (1995), a state title in football (2000), and six state titles in girls' gymnastics (2008, 2009, 2010, 2011, 2012, 2013).

== Rock climbing ==
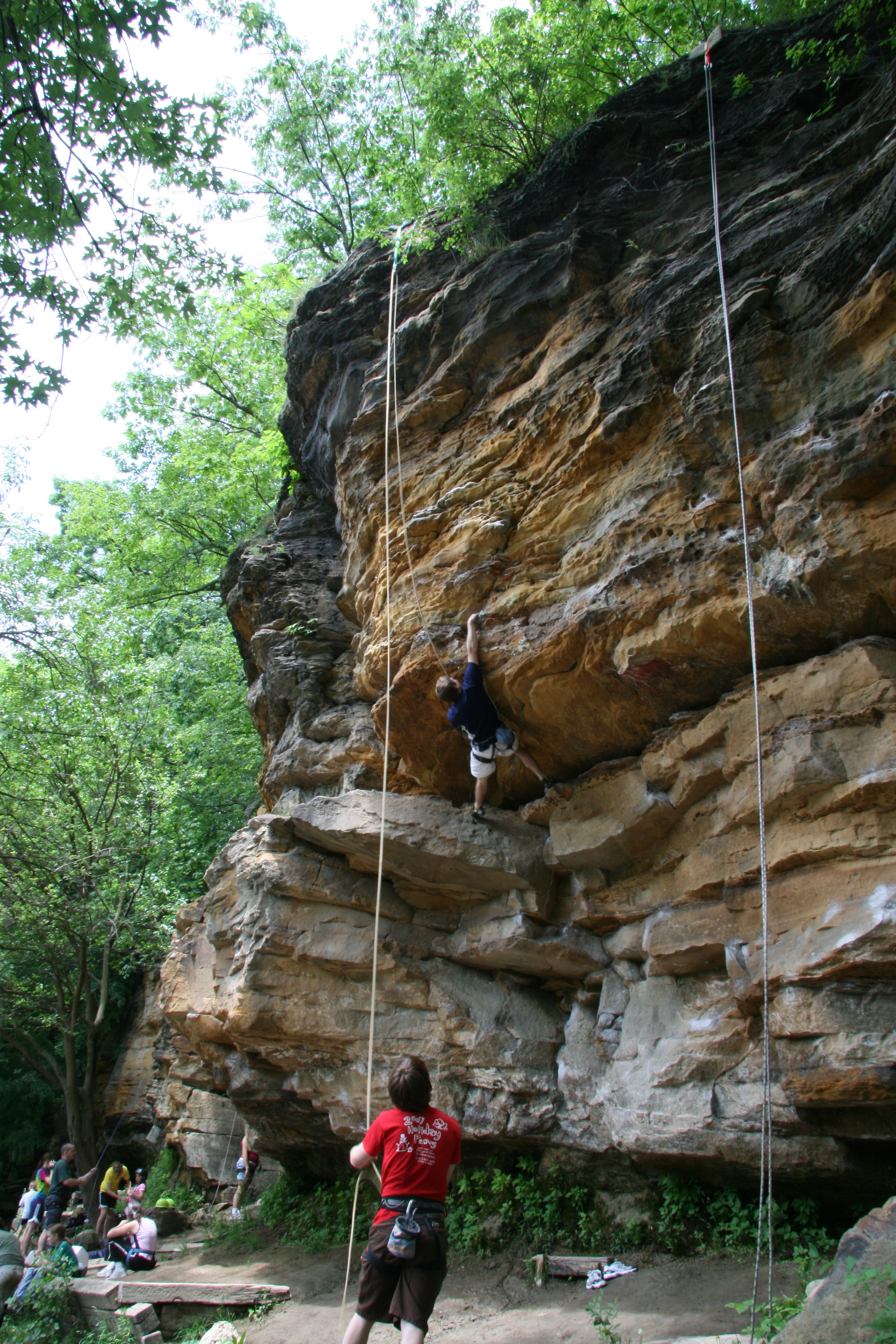
Popular rock climbing route Doug's Roof

Oak Park in Grand Ledge is one of the few places to climb in Michigan, making it a popular destination for local climbers. The sandstone cliffs along the river have nearly 100 routes ranging from basic (5.2) to very difficult (5.13).

== Notable people ==
- Paul Baribeau, musician
- Reid Boucher, NHL player
- Matt Greene, NHL player
- Al Horford, NBA player
- Deborah Diesen, Children’s book author
- Frank Fitzgerald, Governor of Michigan
- Frank M. Fitzgerald, lawyer and legislator
- John Warner Fitzgerald, jurist
- John Wesley Fitzgerald, businessman and legislator
