= Frank Fitzgerald =

American politician (1885–1939)

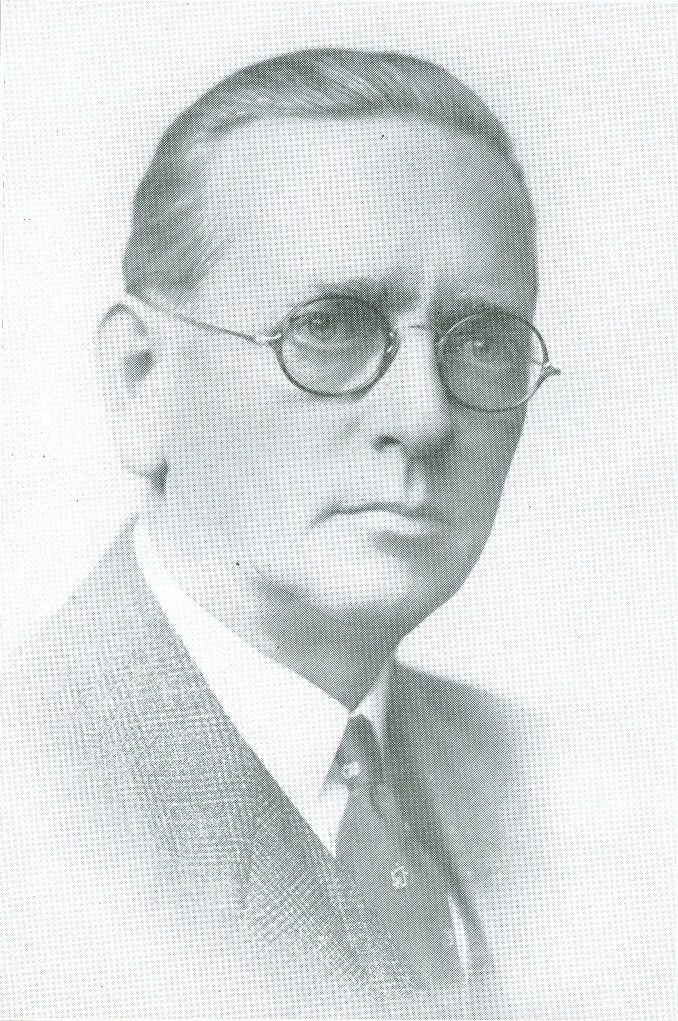

34th & 36th Governor of Michigan
- In office January 1, 1939 – March 16, 1939
- Lieutenant: Luren Dickinson
- Preceded by: Frank Murphy
- Succeeded by: Luren Dickinson
- In office January 1, 1935 – January 1, 1937
- Lieutenant: Thomas Read
- Preceded by: William Comstock
- Succeeded by: Frank Murphy

30th Secretary of State of Michigan
- In office January 1, 1931 – January 1, 1935
- Governor: Wilber M. Brucker; William Comstock
- Preceded by: John S. Haggerty
- Succeeded by: Clarke W. Brown

Personal details
- Born: Frank Dwight Fitzgerald; January 27, 1885 Grand Ledge, Michigan, US
- Died: March 16, 1939 (aged 54) Grand Ledge, Michigan, US
- Party: Republican
- Spouse: Queena M. Warner

Frank Dwight Fitzgerald (January 27, 1885 – March 16, 1939) was an American politician. He was elected as the 34th and 36th governor of Michigan and was the only Michigan governor to die in office.

== Early life ==
Fitzgerald was born on January 27, 1885, in Grand Ledge, Michigan, to politician John Wesley Fitzgerald. He married Queena M. Warner on June 28, 1909, having one child together John W. Fitzgerald, a Michigan State Senator and justice of the Michigan Supreme Court as well as chief justice in 1982. Fitzgerald was also the grandfather of Frank M. Fitzgerald, who was a member of the Michigan House from the 56th District 1987-1992 and 71st District 1993–1996, and the great-grandfather of John Fitzgerald, the Democratic State Representative from the 83rd District in Wyoming. He attended Grand Ledge High School, and received further education at the Ferris Institute (now Ferris State University) in Big Rapids.

== Politics ==
Fitzgerald entered politics in 1913, serving as clerk of the State House, as well as serving as clerk of the State Senate, a position held six years. He was also deputy secretary of state from 1919 to 1923.

Fitzgerald served as a delegate from Michigan to the 1924 Republican National Convention at which incumbent Calvin Coolidge was nominated for President. He was a member of Michigan Republican State Central Committee, 1925–1926 and secretary of the Michigan Republican Party, 1929–30. In 1931, he was elected Secretary of State of Michigan. He served as a delegate to the 1932 Republican National Convention, when the convention nominated incumbent President Herbert Hoover. Hoover ultimately lost to Franklin D. Roosevelt in the 1932 General Election.

In 1934, Fitzgerald resigned from office to run for Governor of Michigan. He was elected, defeating Democrat Arthur J. Lacy and served a full two-year term. During his term, the state budget was balanced and the consolidation of state agencies was promoted. Fitzgerald advocated for restructuring gas and weight taxes and exempting farm and industrial product sales from taxation. He was a delegate to the 1936 Republican National Convention, which nominated Alf Landon, who ultimately lost to Roosevelt in the 1936 General Election. Later that year, Fitzgerald was defeated in his bid for re-election as governor by Democrat Frank Murphy.

Fitzgerald's son, John Warner Fitzgerald, was a Michigan State Senator and Michigan Supreme Court Justice. Fitzgerald's grandson, Frank M. Fitzgerald, served in the Michigan State House of Representatives between 1986 and 1998. Fitzgerald's great-grandson, John W. Fitzgerald, is a Democratic State Representative for the 83rd Michigan House District, which includes portions of the City of Grand Rapids and the City of Wyoming.

== Non-consecutive election and death ==
Fitzgerald defeated Murphy in 1938, and joined John S. Barry as the only two people to serve non-consecutive terms as Governor of Michigan. He suffered a heart attack after battling the flu and died in office, in Grand Ledge, on March 16, 1939, aged 54. Fitzgerald was the only Michigan governor to die in office and was succeeded by Lieutenant Governor Luren Dickinson. He was also one of only four governors to lie in state in the Capitol Building.

Fizgerald was a member of the Freemasons, Fraternal Order of Eagles, Shriners, Knights of Pythias, Knights of the Maccabees and Odd Fellows. He is interred at Oakwood Cemetery in Grand Ledge, Michigan. In the city of Warren, Fitzgerald High School was named in honor of the former governor on Ryan Road.

== Sources ==
- The Political Graveyard
- National Governors Association

Party political offices
Preceded by Wilber M. Brucker	Republican nominee for Governor of Michigan; 1934, 1936, 1938	Succeeded by Luren Dickinson
Political offices
Preceded by John S. Haggerty	Michigan Secretary of State; 1931–1934	Succeeded by Clarke W. Brown
Preceded by William Comstock	Governor of Michigan; 1935–1937	Succeeded by Frank Murphy
Preceded by Frank Murphy	Governor of Michigan; 1939	Succeeded by Luren Dickinson
