= 1936 Michigan gubernatorial election =

- November 3, 1936
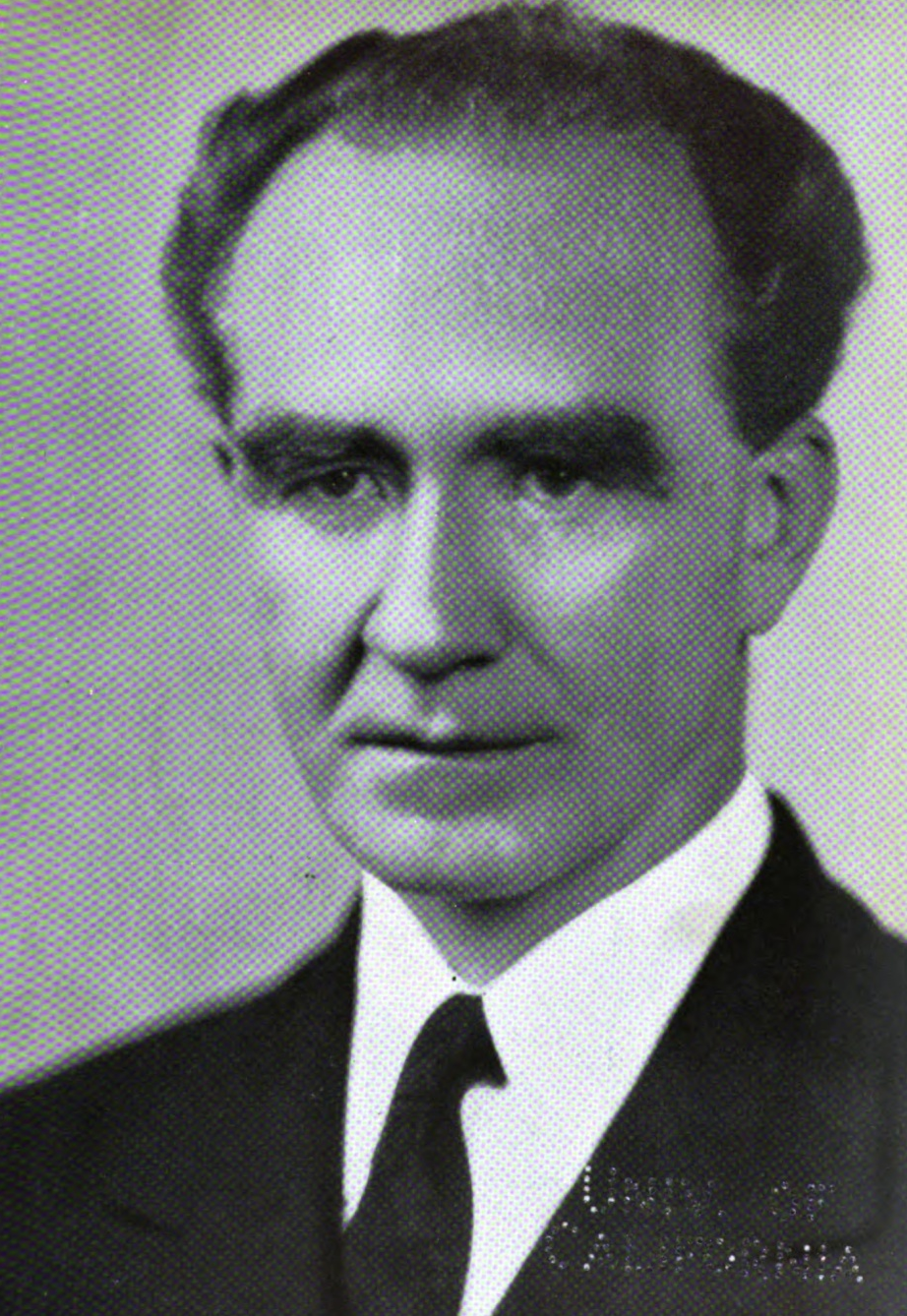

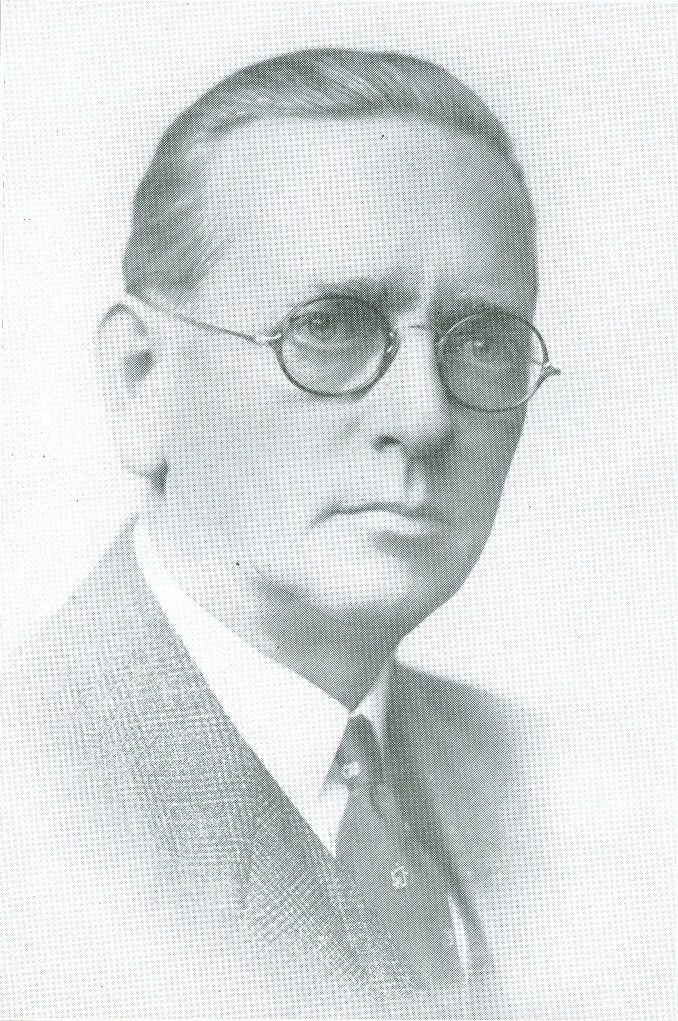
Nominee	Frank Murphy	Frank Fitzgerald
Party	Democratic	Republican
Popular vote	892,774	843,855
Percentage	51.02%	48.23%
- County results Murphy: 40–50% 50–60% 60–70% Fitzgerald: 50–60% 60–70% 70–80%
Governor before election
Frank Fitzgerald
Republican
Elected Governor
Frank Murphy
Democratic

The 1936 Michigan gubernatorial election was held on November 3, 1936. Democratic nominee Frank Murphy defeated incumbent Republican Frank Fitzgerald with 51.02% of the vote.

== Primary election ==
Michigan held primary elections on September 15, 1936.

=== Republican party ===
Incumbent governor Frank Fitzgerald was easily renominated for a second term.

==== Candidates ====
- Roscoe Conkling Fitch, publisher from Detroit
- Frank Fitzgerald, incumbent governor

==== Results ====
Republican primary results
Party	Candidate	Votes	%
Republican	Frank Fitzgerald (inc.)	455,876	89.53%
Republican	Roscoe Conkling Fitch	53,249	10.46%
Republican	Scattering	47	0.01%
Total votes		509,172	100.00%

=== Democratic party ===
Frank Murphy defeated George W. Welsh for the Democratic nomination.

==== Candidates ====
- Frank Murphy, High Commissioner to the Philippines
- George W. Welsh, former Lieutenant Governor of Michigan

==== Results ====
Democratic primary results
Party	Candidate	Votes	%
Democratic	Frank Murphy	278,967	68.12%
Democratic	George W. Welsh	130,537	31.88%
Democratic	Scattering	8	0.00%
Total votes		409,512	100.00%

== General election ==
=== Candidates ===
Major party candidates

- Frank Murphy, Democratic
- Frank Fitzgerald, Republican

Other candidates

- John Monarch, Socialist
- Simeon P. Martin, Farmer–Labor
- Philip Raymond, Communism
- Clayton O'Donohue, Socialist Labor
- Ray T. Fuller, Commonwealth
- Charles F. Mann, American

=== Results ===
1936 Michigan gubernatorial election
Party	Candidate	Votes	%	±%
Democratic	Frank Murphy	892,774	51.02%	+5.19%
Republican	Frank Fitzgerald (inc.)	843,855	48.23%	−4.18%
Socialist	John Monarch	6,631	0.38%	−0.57%
Farmer–Labor	Simeon P. Martin	3,289	0.19%	+0.02%
Communist	Philip Raymond	2,071	0.12%	−0.34%
Socialist Labor	Clayton O'Donohue	524	0.03%	−0.05%
Commonwealth	Ray T. Fuller	433	0.02%	−0.04%
National	Charles F. Mann	170	0.01%	−0.00%
	Scattering	22	0.00	
Majority		48,919	2.80%	
Total votes		1,749,769	100.00%	
Democratic gain from Republican		Swing	+9.36%	

==== Results by county ====
Marquette County voted Democratic for the first time since 1874 while Schoolcraft County voted Democratic for the first time since 1892. After this election, Saginaw County would not vote Democratic again until 1982 while Mason County would not vote Democratic again until 1986.

County	Frank Murphy Democratic		Frank Fitzgerald Republican		John Monarch Socialist		Simeon P. Martin Farmer-Labor		Philip Raymond Communist		All Others Various		Margin		Total votes cast
County	#	%	#	%	#	%	#	%	#	%	#	%	#	%	Total votes cast
Alcona	734	32.07%	1,550	67.72%	4	0.17%	1	0.04%	0	0.00%	0	0.00%	-816	-35.65%	2,289
Alger	2,547	61.93%	1,507	36.64%	8	0.19%	3	0.07%	48	1.17%	0	0.00%	1,040	25.29%	4,113
Allegan	4,773	31.07%	10,518	68.46%	23	0.15%	26	0.17%	10	0.07%	14	0.09%	-5,745	-37.39%	15,364
Alpena	2,777	40.34%	4,089	59.40%	14	0.20%	1	0.01%	2	0.03%	1	0.01%	-1,312	-19.06%	6,884
Antrim	1,730	39.15%	2,677	60.58%	7	0.16%	1	0.02%	0	0.00%	4	0.09%	-947	-21.43%	4,419
Arenac	1,417	42.73%	1,881	56.72%	6	0.18%	3	0.09%	4	0.12%	5	0.15%	-464	-13.99%	3,316
Baraga	2,008	47.58%	2,176	51.56%	0	0.00%	8	0.19%	28	0.66%	0	0.00%	-168	-3.98%	4,220
Barry	3,146	35.11%	5,769	64.39%	23	0.26%	11	0.12%	5	0.06%	6	0.07%	-2,623	-29.27%	8,960
Bay	12,501	52.66%	11,153	46.99%	60	0.25%	7	0.03%	8	0.03%	8	0.03%	1,348	5.68%	23,737
Benzie	1,449	41.71%	2,004	57.69%	12	0.35%	6	0.17%	2	0.06%	1	0.03%	-55	-15.98%	3,474
Berrien	17,697	49.51%	17,930	50.16%	85	0.24%	13	0.04%	9	0.03%	9	0.03%	-233	-0.65%	35,743
Branch	4,729	42.48%	6,360	57.13%	19	0.17%	4	0.04%	7	0.06%	13	0.12%	-1,631	-14.65%	11,132
Calhoun	17,655	50.17%	17,368	49.36%	120	0.34%	9	0.03%	19	0.05%	16	0.05%	287	0.82%	35,187
Cass	4,565	46.62%	5,200	53.10%	13	0.13%	6	0.06%	3	0.03%	5	0.05%	-635	-6.48%	9,792
Charlevoix	2,216	39.93%	3,277	59.05%	51	0.92%	2	0.04%	1	0.02%	3	0.05%	-1,061	-19.12%	5,550
Cheboygan	2,780	47.85%	3,000	51.64%	22	0.38%	3	0.05%	1	0.02%	4	0.07%	-220	-3.79%	5,810
Chippewa	4,830	47.51%	5,293	52.07%	10	0.10%	8	0.08%	21	0.21%	4	0.04%	-463	-4.55%	10,166
Clare	1,219	33.66%	2,373	65.53%	18	0.50%	3	0.08%	0	0.00%	8	0.22%	-1,154	-31.87%	3,621
Clinton	3,654	38.11%	5,913	61.67%	13	0.14%	2	0.02%	0	0.00%	6	0.06%	-2,259	-23.56%	9,588
Crawford	698	48.37%	733	50.80%	12	0.83%	0	0.00%	0	0.00%	0	0.00%	-35	-2.43%	1,443
Delta	8,498	63.39%	4,806	35.85%	57	0.43%	23	0.17%	18	0.13%	4	0.03%	3,692	27.54%	13,406
Dickinson	7,351	59.19%	4,971	40.03%	51	0.41%	27	0.22%	16	0.13%	3	0.02%	2,380	19.16%	12,419
Eaton	5,415	39.09%	8,363	60.37%	63	0.45%	9	0.06%	0	0.00%	4	0.03%	-2,948	-21.28%	13,854
Emmet	2,551	40.83%	3,667	58.69%	23	0.37%	2	0.03%	1	0.02%	4	0.06%	-1,116	-17.86%	6,248
Genesee	43,403	59.93%	28,752	39.70%	165	0.23%	44	0.06%	33	0.05%	25	0.03%	14,651	20.23%	72,422
Gladwin	1,152	35.65%	2,073	64.16%	3	0.09%	2	0.06%	0	0.00%	1	0.03%	-921	-28.51%	3,231
Gogebic	7,508	58.07%	5,233	40.47%	43	0.33%	87	0.67%	48	0.37%	11	0.09%	2,275	17.59%	12,930
Grand Traverse	3,229	42.34%	4,375	57.36%	14	0.18%	4	0.05%	3	0.04%	2	0.03%	-1,146	-15.03%	7,627
Gratiot	4,499	41.08%	6,407	58.50%	19	0.17%	6	0.05%	1	0.01%	20	0.18%	-1,908	-17.42%	10,952
Hillsdale	4,119	34.65%	7,744	65.14%	8	0.07%	6	0.05%	3	0.03%	8	0.07%	-3,625	-30.49%	11,888
Houghton	11,072	53.13%	9,683	46.47%	9	0.04%	21	0.10%	53	0.25%	0	0.00%	1,389	6.67%	20,838
Huron	3,844	36.39%	6,653	62.98%	39	0.37%	2	0.02%	2	0.02%	24	0.23%	-2,809	-26.59%	10,564
Ingham	23,887	50.36%	23,335	49.20%	137	0.29%	24	0.05%	22	0.05%	25	0.05%	552	1.16%	47,430
Ionia	6,254	43.91%	7,919	55.60%	28	0.20%	34	0.24%	0	0.00%	9	0.06%	-1,665	-11.69%	14,244
Iosco	1,257	37.15%	2,117	62.56%	4	0.12%	1	0.03%	4	0.12%	1	0.03%	-860	-25.41%	3,384
Iron	4,837	54.11%	4,036	45.15%	10	0.11%	31	0.35%	21	0.23%	5	0.06%	801	8.96%	8,940
Isabella	3,280	39.20%	5,017	59.95%	20	0.24%	37	0.44%	5	0.06%	9	0.11%	-1,737	-20.76%	8,368
Jackson	17,633	49.13%	18,120	50.48%	73	0.20%	16	0.04%	32	0.09%	20	0.06%	-487	-1.36%	35,894
Kalamazoo	14,996	41.11%	21,232	58.21%	93	0.25%	12	0.03%	20	0.05%	122	0.33%	-6,236	-17.10%	36,475
Kalkaska	660	36.71%	1,124	62.51%	11	0.61%	1	0.06%	0	0.00%	2	0.11%	-464	-25.81%	1,798
Kent	40,945	49.80%	40,469	49.22%	379	0.46%	258	0.31%	108	0.13%	65	0.08%	476	0.58%	82,224
Keweenaw	1,027	48.79%	1,058	50.26%	7	0.33%	1	0.05%	12	0.57%	0	0.00%	-31	-1.47%	2,105
Lake	1,171	48.67%	1,225	50.91%	6	0.25%	1	0.04%	2	0.08%	1	0.04%	-54	-2.24%	2,406
Lapeer	2,805	31.21%	6,151	68.44%	17	0.19%	7	0.08%	0	0.00%	7	0.08%	-3,346	-37.23%	8,987
Leelanau	1,330	40.71%	1,924	58.89%	7	0.21%	0	0.00%	3	0.09%	3	0.09%	-594	-18.18%	3,267
Lenawee	6,797	32.68%	13,945	67.04%	44	0.21%	10	0.05%	1	0.00%	4	0.02%	-7,148	-34.36%	20,801
Livingston	3,319	34.92%	6,164	64.85%	16	0.17%	3	0.03%	1	0.01%	2	0.02%	-2,845	-29.93%	9,505
Luce	1,088	44.52%	1,347	55.11%	3	0.12%	0	0.00%	3	0.12%	3	0.12%	-259	-10.60%	2,444
Mackinac	2,083	49.23%	2,136	50.48%	10	0.24%	1	0.02%	0	0.00%	1	0.02%	-53	-1.25%	4,231
Macomb	14,760	52.11%	13,430	47.41%	75	0.26%	14	0.05%	31	0.11%	17	0.06%	1,330	4.70%	28,327
Manistee	4,269	51.79%	3,943	47.83%	16	0.19%	10	0.12%	5	0.06%	0	0.00%	326	3.95%	8,243
Marquette	10,695	56.20%	8,235	43.27%	29	0.15%	16	0.08%	50	0.26%	6	0.03%	2,460	12.93%	19,031
Mason	3,963	50.02%	3,913	49.39%	21	0.27%	4	0.05%	15	0.19%	7	0.09%	50	0.63%	7,923
Mecosta	2,237	36.85%	3,720	61.29%	9	0.15%	99	1.63%	2	0.03%	3	0.05%	-1,483	-24.43%	6,070
Menominee	6,316	61.51%	3,895	37.93%	35	0.34%	9	0.09%	11	0.11%	3	0.03%	2,421	23.58%	10,269
Midland	2,969	38.11%	4,773	61.26%	26	0.33%	12	0.15%	5	0.06%	6	0.08%	-1,804	-23.15%	7,791
Missaukee	1,251	40.33%	1,843	59.41%	6	0.19%	0	0.00%	1	0.03%	1	0.03%	-592	-19.08%	3,102
Monroe	9,987	49.01%	10,317	50.63%	26	0.13%	11	0.05%	6	0.03%	29	0.14%	-330	-1.62%	20,376
Montcalm	4,019	39.04%	5,776	56.10%	38	0.37%	448	4.35%	1	0.01%	13	0.13%	-1,757	-17.07%	10,295
Montmorency	740	42.85%	976	56.51%	10	0.58%	0	0.00%	1	0.06%	0	0.00%	-236	-13.67%	1,727
Muskegon	15,637	58.52%	10,827	40.52%	103	0.39%	99	0.37%	44	0.16%	11	0.04%	4,810	18.00%	26,721
Newaygo	2,674	35.74%	4,718	63.07%	25	0.33%	59	0.79%	4	0.05%	1	0.01%	-2,044	-27.32%	7,481
Oakland	33,628	46.71%	37,963	52.73%	226	0.31%	60	0.08%	78	0.11%	41	0.06%	-4,335	-6.02%	71,996
Oceana	2,364	41.52%	3,299	57.95%	14	0.25%	9	0.16%	4	0.07%	3	0.05%	-935	-16.42%	5,693
Ogemaw	1,472	41.95%	2,020	57.57%	15	0.43%	1	0.03%	1	0.03%	0	0.00%	-548	-15.62%	3,509
Ontonagon	2,920	54.13%	2,336	43.31%	9	0.17%	23	0.43%	104	1.93%	2	0.04%	584	10.83%	5,394
Osceola	1,714	32.08%	3,478	65.09%	11	0.21%	136	2.55%	2	0.04%	2	0.04%	-1,764	-33.02%	5,343
Oscoda	392	42.20%	537	57.80%	0	0.00%	0	0.00%	0	0.00%	0	0.00%	-145	-15.61%	929
Otsego	1,070	45.73%	1,265	54.06%	2	0.09%	1	0.04%	0	0.00%	2	0.09%	-195	-8.33%	2,340
Ottawa	8,543	40.72%	12,230	58.29%	62	0.30%	122	0.58%	16	0.08%	7	0.03%	-3,687	-17.57%	20,980
Presque Isle	2,543	56.25%	1,964	43.44%	7	0.15%	4	0.09%	0	0.00%	3	0.07%	579	12.81%	4,521
Roscommon	572	35.79%	1,014	63.45%	9	0.56%	2	0.13%	0	0.00%	1	0.06%	-442	-27.66%	1,598
Saginaw	20,718	51.85%	18,953	47.44%	187	0.47%	49	0.12%	16	0.04%	31	0.08%	1,765	4.42%	39,954
Sanilac	2,427	22.63%	8,273	77.14%	16	0.15%	2	0.02%	2	0.02%	5	0.05%	-5,846	-54.51%	10,725
Schoolcraft	2,079	56.10%	1,607	43.36%	14	0.38%	2	0.05%	2	0.05%	2	0.05%	472	12.74%	3,706
Shiawassee	5,567	41.95%	7,651	57.65%	30	0.23%	16	0.12%	3	0.02%	4	0.03%	-2,084	-15.70%	13,271
St. Clair	10,491	39.03%	16,285	60.59%	34	0.13%	24	0.09%	3	0.01%	40	0.15%	-5,794	-21.56%	26,877
St. Joseph	4,914	36.58%	8,489	63.20%	17	0.13%	1	0.01%	1	0.01%	10	0.07%	-3,575	-26.62%	13,432
Tuscola	2,936	28.26%	7,399	71.21%	22	0.21%	25	0.24%	3	0.03%	5	0.05%	-4,463	-42.95%	10,390
Van Buren	5,671	35.76%	10,081	63.57%	47	0.30%	27	0.17%	22	0.14%	11	0.07%	-4,410	-27.81%	15,859
Washtenaw	10,904	37.51%	18,012	61.97%	60	0.21%	57	0.20%	18	0.06%	15	0.05%	-7,108	-24.45%	29,066
Wayne	359,758	59.35%	240,331	39.65%	3,537	0.58%	1,160	0.19%	1,036	0.17%	366	0.06%	119,427	19.70%	606,188
Wexford	3,439	49.47%	3,485	50.13%	14	0.20%	0	0.00%	4	0.06%	10	0.14%	-46	-0.66%	6,952
Total	892,774	51.02%	843,855	48.23%	6,631	0.38%	3,289	0.19%	2,071	0.12%	1,149	0.07%	48,919	2.80%	1,749,769

===== Counties that flipped from Republican to Democratic =====
- Calhoun
- Genesee
- Houghton
- Ingham
- Kent
- Manistee
- Marquette
- Mason
- Muskegon
- Ontonagon
- Saginaw
- Schoolcraft

===== Counties that flipped from Democratic to Republican =====
- Monroe
