= Frank Murphy =

American judge (1890–1949)

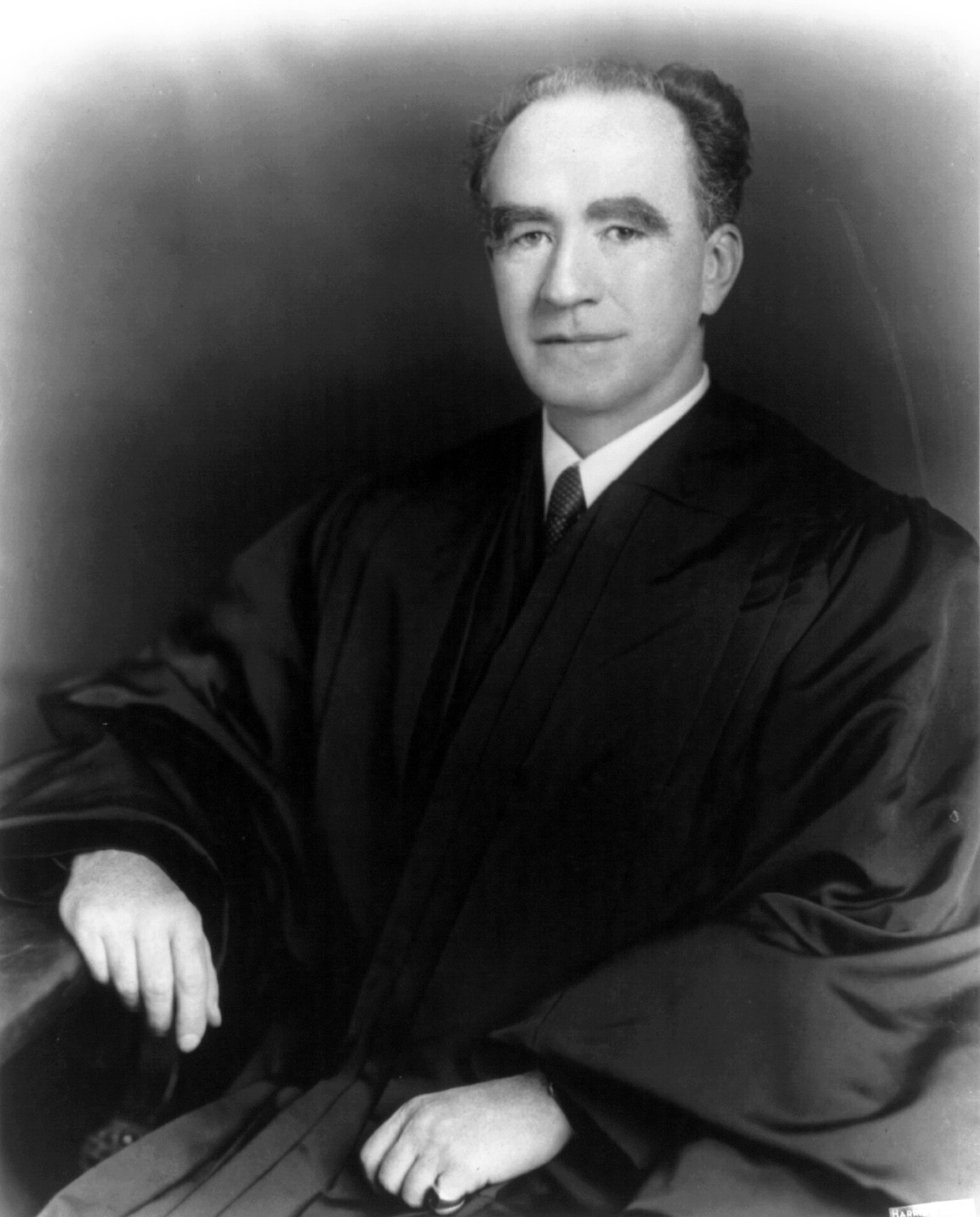
- Official portrait, 1940s

Associate Justice of the Supreme Court of the United States
- In office February 5, 1940 – July 19, 1949
- Appointed by: Franklin D. Roosevelt
- Preceded by: Pierce Butler
- Succeeded by: Tom C. Clark

56th United States Attorney General
- In office January 2, 1939 – January 18, 1940
- President: Franklin D. Roosevelt
- Preceded by: Homer Stille Cummings
- Succeeded by: Robert H. Jackson

35th Governor of Michigan
- In office January 1, 1937 – January 1, 1939
- Lieutenant: Leo J. Nowicki
- Preceded by: Frank Fitzgerald
- Succeeded by: Frank Fitzgerald

1st High Commissioner to the Philippines
- In office November 15, 1935 – December 31, 1936
- President: Franklin D. Roosevelt
- Preceded by: Himself (Governor General)
- Succeeded by: J. Weldon Jones (acting)

Governor General of the Philippine Islands
- In office July 15, 1933 – November 15, 1935
- President: Franklin D. Roosevelt
- Preceded by: Theodore Roosevelt Jr.
- Succeeded by: Manuel L. Quezon (President)

55th Mayor of Detroit
- In office September 23, 1930 – May 10, 1933
- Preceded by: Charles Bowles
- Succeeded by: Frank Couzens

1st President of the United States Conference of Mayors
- In office May 1, 1932 – May 10, 1933
- Preceded by: Position established
- Succeeded by: James Michael Curley

Personal details
- Born: William Francis Murphy; April 13, 1890 Harbor Beach, Michigan, U.S.
- Died: July 19, 1949 (aged 59) Detroit, Michigan, U.S.
- Party: Democratic
- Education: University of Michigan (BA, LLB)

Military service
- Allegiance: United States
- Branch/service: United States Army
- Years of service: 1917–1919; 1942
- Rank: Lieutenant Colonel
- Unit: United States Army Reserve
- Battles/wars: World War I World War II

William Francis Murphy (April 13, 1890 – July 19, 1949) was an American politician, lawyer, and jurist from Harbor Beach, Michigan. He was a Democrat who was named to the Supreme Court of the United States in 1940 after a political career that included serving as United States Attorney General, 35th governor of Michigan, and Mayor of Detroit. He also served as the last American Governor-General of the Philippines and the first High Commissioner to the Philippines.

Born in "The Thumb" region of Michigan, Murphy graduated from the University of Michigan Law School in 1914. After serving in the United States Army during World War I, he served as a federal attorney and trial judge. He served as Mayor of Detroit from 1930 to 1933. A panel of 69 scholars in 1993 ranked him among the ten best mayors in American history. In 1933 he was appointed as Governor-General of the Philippine Islands. He returned home in 1936 and defeated incumbent Republican governor Frank Fitzgerald in the 1936 Michigan gubernatorial election and served a single term as Governor of Michigan. Murphy lost re-election to Fitzgerald in 1938 and accepted an appointment as the United States Attorney General the following year.

In 1940, President Franklin D. Roosevelt appointed Murphy to the Supreme Court to fill a vacancy caused by the death of Pierce Butler. Murphy served on the Court from 1940 until his death in 1949, and was succeeded by Tom C. Clark. Murphy is famous for writing the Court's majority opinions in Chaplinsky v. New Hampshire and SEC v. W. J. Howey Co., and for his fiery dissent in Korematsu v. United States.

== Early life ==
Murphy was born in Harbor Beach (then called Sand Beach), Michigan, in 1890. Both his parents, John T. Murphy and Mary Brennan, were Irish immigrants and raised him as a devout Catholic. He followed in his father's footsteps by becoming a lawyer. He attended the University of Michigan Law School, and graduated with a BA in 1912 and an LLB in 1914. He was a member of the Sigma Chi fraternity and the senior society Michigamua.

Murphy was admitted to the State Bar of Michigan in 1914, after which he clerked with a Detroit law firm for three years. He then served with the American Expeditionary Forces in Europe during World War I, achieving the rank of captain with the occupation army in Germany before leaving the service in 1919. He remained abroad afterward to pursue graduate studies. He did his graduate work at Lincoln's Inn in London and Trinity College, Dublin, which was said to be formative for his judicial philosophy. He developed a need to decide cases based on his more holistic notions of justice, eschewing technical legal arguments. As one commentator quipped of his later Supreme Court service, he "tempered justice with Murphy."

== Career ==
=== 1919–1922: U.S. Attorney, Eastern District of Michigan ===
Murphy was appointed and took the oath of office as the first Assistant United States Attorney for the Eastern District of Michigan on August 9, 1919. He was one of three assistant attorneys in the office.

When Murphy began his career as a federal attorney, the workload of the attorney's office was increasing at a rapid rate, mainly because of the number of prosecutions resulting from the enforcement of national prohibition. The government's excellent record in winning convictions in the Eastern District was partially due to Murphy's record of winning all but one of the cases he prosecuted. He practiced law privately to a limited extent while still a federal attorney, and resigned his position as a United States attorney on March 1, 1922. He had several offers to join private practices, but decided to go it alone and formed a partnership with Edward G. Kemp in Detroit.

=== 1923–1930: Recorder's Court ===
Murphy ran unsuccessfully as a Democrat for the United States Congress in 1920, when national and state Republicans swept Michigan, but used his legal reputation and growing political connections to win a seat on the Recorder's Court, Detroit's criminal court. In 1923, he was elected judge of the Recorder's Court on a non-partisan ticket by one of the largest majorities ever cast for a judge in Detroit, took office on January 1, 1924, and served seven years during the Prohibition era.

While on Recorder's Court, he established a reputation as a trial judge. He was a presiding judge in the famous murder trials of Dr. Ossian Sweet and his brother, Henry Sweet, in 1925 and 1926. Clarence Darrow, then one of the most prominent trial lawyers in the country, was lead counsel for the defense. After an initial mistrial of all of the black defendants, Henry Sweet—who admitted that he fired the weapon which killed a member of the mob surrounding Dr. Sweet's home and was retried separately—was acquitted by an all-white jury on grounds of the right of self-defense. The prosecution then elected to not prosecute any of the remaining defendants. Murphy's rulings were material to the outcome of the case.

=== 1930–1933: Mayor of Detroit ===
In 1930, Murphy ran as a Democrat and was elected Mayor of Detroit. He served from 1930 to 1933, during the first years of the Great Depression. He presided over an epidemic of urban unemployment, a crisis in which 100,000 were unemployed in the summer of 1931. He named an unemployment committee of private citizens from businesses, churches, and labor and social service organizations to identify all residents who were unemployed and not receiving welfare benefits. The Mayor's Unemployment Committee raised funds for its relief effort and worked to distribute food and clothing to the needy, and a Legal Aid Subcommittee volunteered to assist with the legal problems of needy clients. In 1933, Murphy convened in Detroit and organized the first convention of the United States Conference of Mayors. They met and conferred with President Franklin D. Roosevelt, and Murphy was elected its first president. He served in that position from 1932 until 1933.

Murphy was an early and enthusiastic supporter of Roosevelt and the New Deal, helping Roosevelt to become the first Democratic presidential candidate to win the state of Michigan since Franklin Pierce in 1852 before the Republican Party was founded.

A 1993 survey of historians, political scientists, and urban experts conducted by Melvin G. Holli of the University of Illinois at Chicago saw Murphy ranked as the seventh-best American big-city mayor to serve between the years 1820 and 1993. Holli wrote that Murphy was an exemplary mayor and a highly effective leader.

=== 1933–1935: Governor-General of the Philippine Islands ===
By 1933, after Murphy's second mayoral term, the reward of a big government job was waiting. Roosevelt appointed Murphy as Governor-General of the Philippine Islands.

==== Great Depression in the Philippines ====
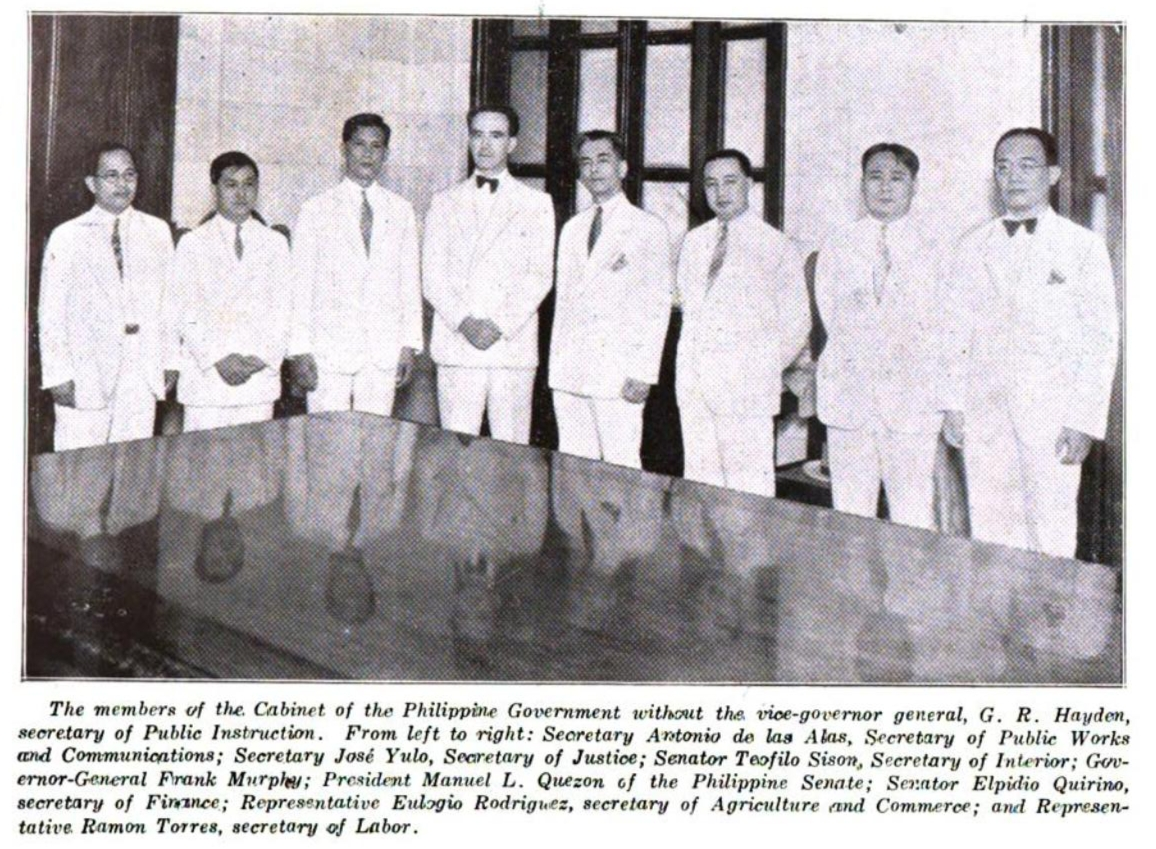
Murphy as governor-general with his Philippine cabinet, c. 1935

In May 1935, more than 6,000, mostly illiterate, landless peasants gathered at government buildings in Manila in protest due to the poor economic conditions in the islands. The peasants were met with gunshots from government forces resulting in 100 deaths. During Murphy's governorship, many Filipino landowners hired private armies and vigilante groups to crush peasant violence. He was sympathetic to the plight of ordinary Filipinos, especially the land-hungry and oppressed tenant farmers, and emphasized the need for social justice. He suggested land reforms, however, late in his governorship.

The Murphy administration also increased its tariffs on Japanese goods in 1934. Responding to the Philippine tariffs, Japan's Consul General Kimura Atsushi warned Manila of possible "serious effects." Kimura also urged the Philippines not to believe in Chinese propaganda.

In his last days as governor-general in 1935, Murphy requested for the release of peasant rebels in jail, who received harsh treatment from government officials, due to his sympathy for the poor working class.

=== 1935–1936: High Commissioner to the Philippines ===
When his position as governor-general was abolished in 1935, he stayed on as United States High Commissioner until 1936. That year, he was a delegate from the Philippine Islands to the Democratic National Convention.

High Commissioner to the Philippines was the title of the personal representative of the president of the United States to the Commonwealth of the Philippines during the period 1935–1946. The office was created by the Tydings–McDuffie Act of 1934, which provided for a period of transition from direct American rule to the complete independence of the islands on July 4, 1946.

=== 1937–1939: Governor of Michigan ===
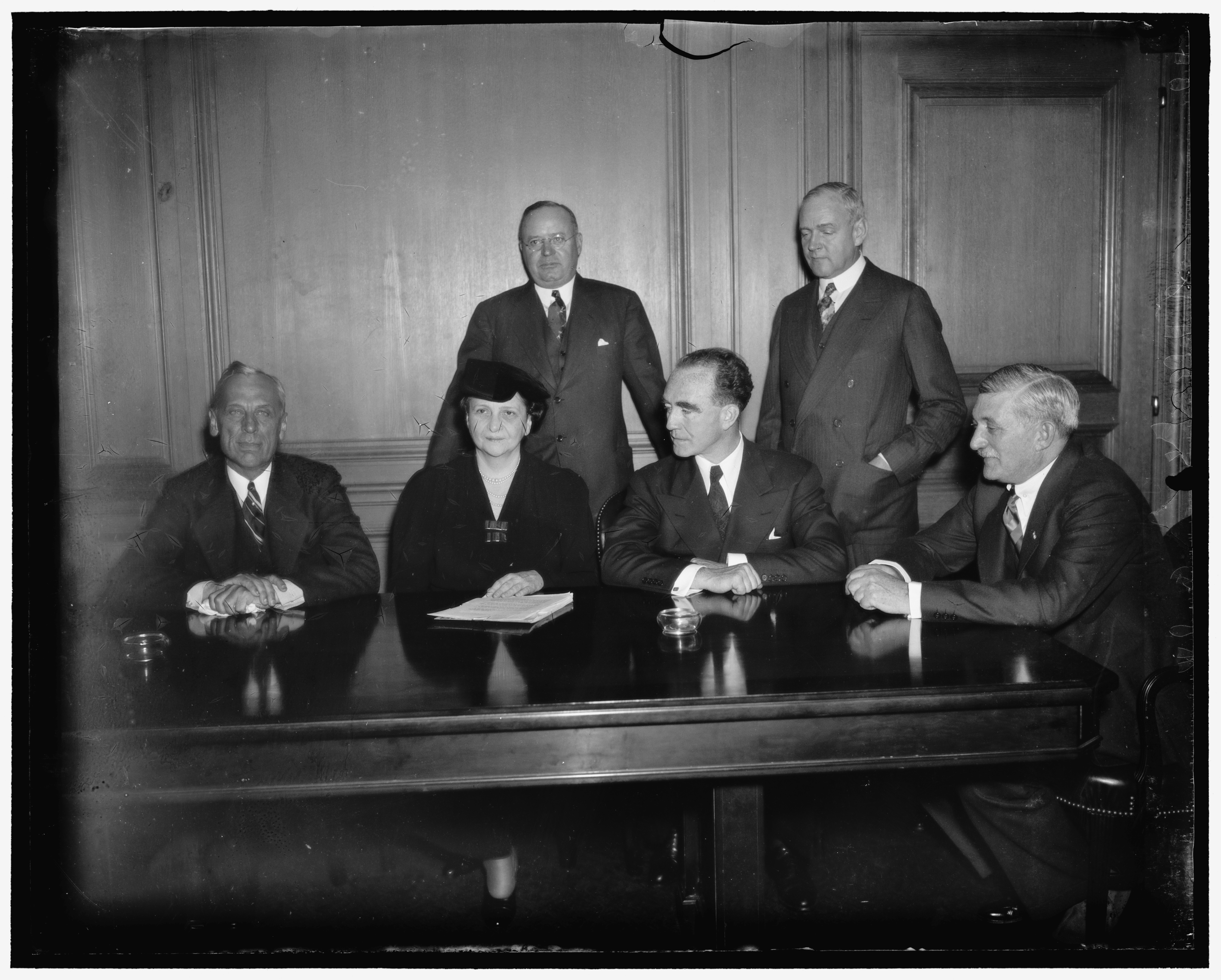
Governor Frank Murphy (seated center-right) and U.S. Secretary of Labor Frances Perkins (seated center-left) meeting with General Motors officials on January 21, 1937, in an effort to end the month-old Flint sit-down strike; the two had met with UAW leaders earlier in the day.

Murphy was elected the 35th governor of Michigan on November 3, 1936, defeating Republican incumbent Frank Fitzgerald, and served one two-year term. During his two years in office, an unemployment compensation system was instituted and mental health programs were improved.

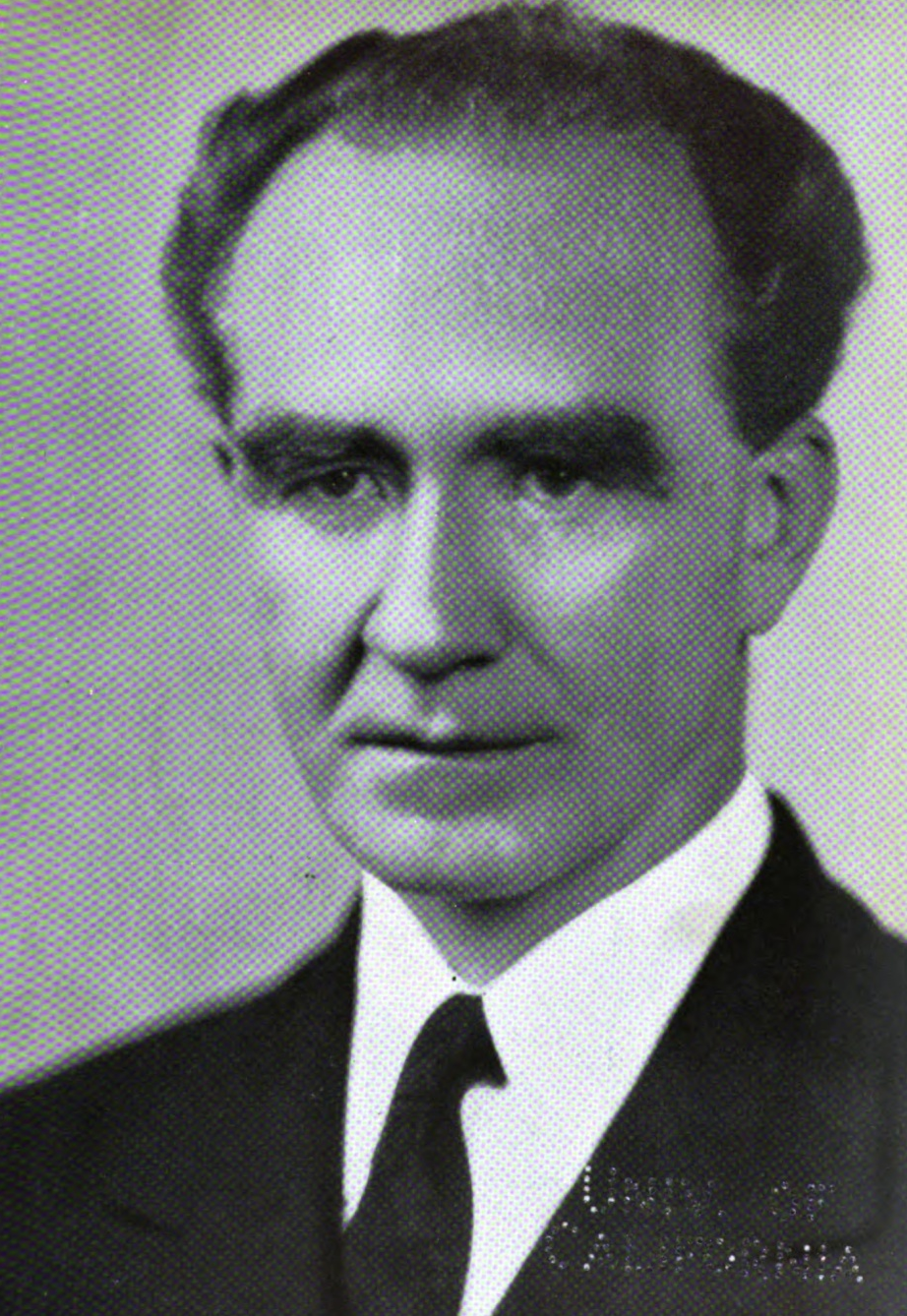
Murphy as governor.

The United Automobile Workers engaged in an historic sit-down strike at General Motors' Flint plant. The Flint Sit-Down Strike was a turning point in national collective bargaining and labor policy. After 27 people were injured in a battle between the workers and the police, including 13 strikers with gunshot wounds, Murphy sent the National Guard to protect the workers, failed to follow a court order that requested him to expel the strikers, and refused to order the Guard's troops to suppress the strike.

He successfully mediated an agreement and end to the confrontation, and G.M. recognized the U.A.W. as a bargaining agent under the newly adopted National Labor Relations Act. This recognition had a significant effect on the growth of organized labor unions. In the next year, the UAW saw its membership grow from 30,000 to 500,000 members. As later noted by the British Broadcasting Corporation (BBC), this strike was "the strike heard round the world."

In 1938, Murphy was defeated by his predecessor, Fitzgerald, who became the only governor of Michigan to precede, and then succeed, the same person.

=== 1939–1940: Attorney General of the United States ===
In 1939, Roosevelt appointed Murphy the 56th attorney general of the United States. He established a Civil Liberties Unit in the Criminal Division of the United States Department of Justice, designed to centralize enforcement responsibility for the Bill of Rights and civil rights statutes.

=== 1940–1949: Supreme Court and military service ===
One year after becoming attorney general, on January 4, 1940, Murphy was nominated by President Roosevelt as Associate Justice of the Supreme Court, filling the vacancy caused by the death of Pierce Butler the previous November. He was confirmed by the United States Senate on January 16, and sworn in on February 5, 1940. The timing of the appointment put Murphy on the cusp of the Charles Evans Hughes and the Harlan F. Stone courts. On the death of Chief Justice Stone, Murphy served in the court led by Frederick Moore Vinson, who was confirmed in 1946. During World War II he served in the Army Reserve during three months of 1942 while the court was in recess. He served as the executive officer to the Chief of Staff of the United States Army George C. Marshall. He retired with the rank of Lieutenant Colonel.

Murphy took an expansive view of individual liberties, and the limitations on government he found in the Bill of Rights. He authored 199 opinions: 131 for the majority, 68 in dissent. One of the important opinions authored by Justice Murphy was Securities and Exchange Commission v. W. J. Howey Co. (1946), in which the Court defined the term "investment contract" under the Securities Act of 1933, thus giving content to the most important concept of what makes something a security in American law.

Opinions differ about him and his jurisprudential philosophy. He has been acclaimed as a legal scholar and a champion of the common man, but Justice Felix Frankfurter disparagingly nicknamed Murphy "the Saint", criticizing his decisions as being rooted more in passion than reason. It has been said he was "neither legal scholar nor craftsman", and he was criticized "for relying on heart over head, results over legal reasoning, clerks over hard work, and emotional solos over team play."

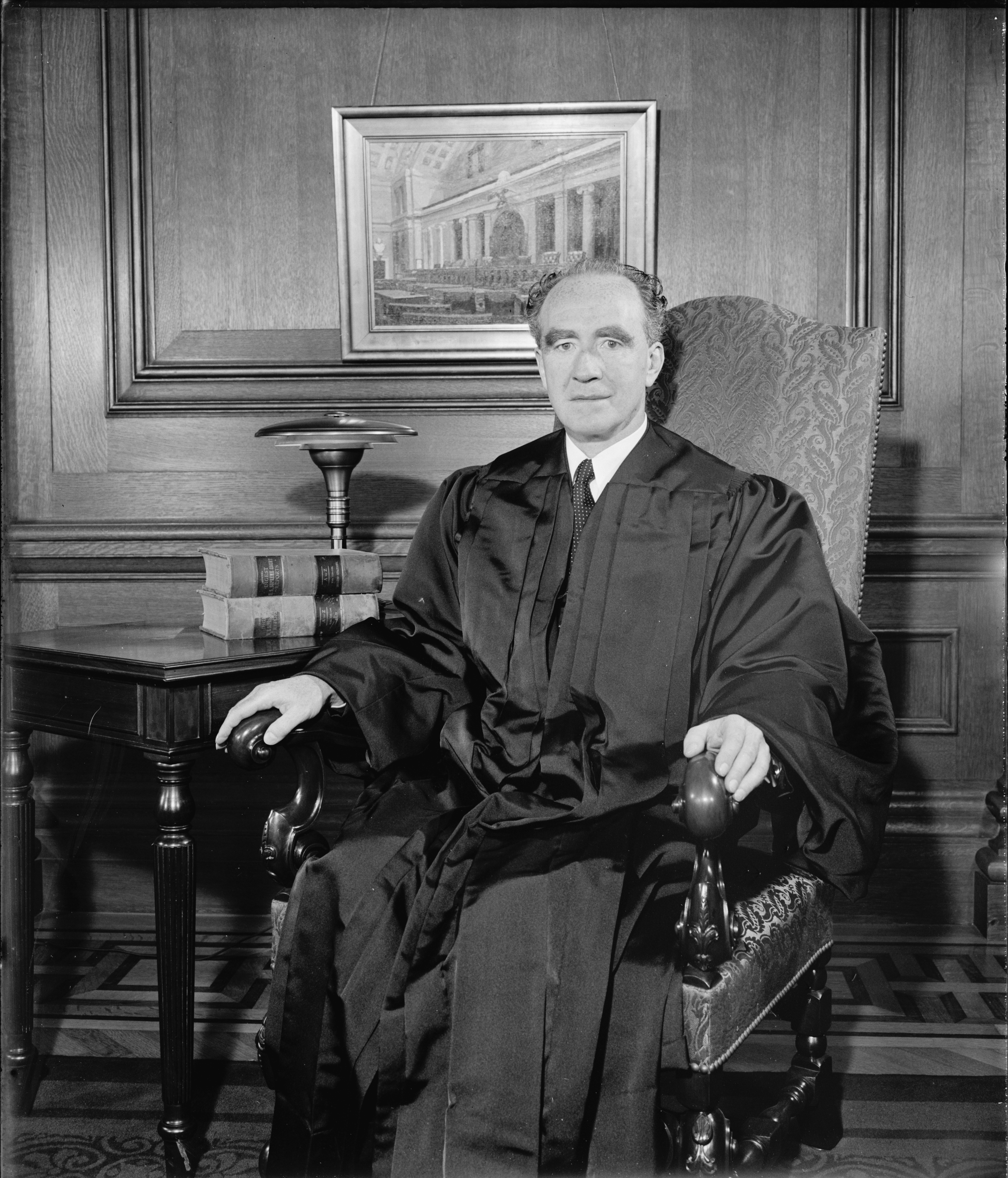
Justice Frank Murphy, February 1940, shortly after joining the Supreme Court

Murphy's support of African Americans, aliens, criminals, dissenters, Jehovah's Witnesses, Native Americans, women, workers and other "outsiders" evoked a pun: "tempering justice with Murphy." As he wrote in Falbo v. United States (1944), "The law knows no finer hour than when it cuts through formal concepts and transitory emotions to protect unpopular citizens against discrimination and persecution." (p. 561)

According to Frankfurter, Murphy was part of the more liberal "axis" of justices on the Court along with justices Wiley B. Rutledge, William O. Douglas, and Hugo L. Black; the group would for years oppose Frankfurter's "judicially restrained" conservative ideology. Douglas, Murphy and then Rutledge were the first justices to agree with Black's notion that the Fourteenth Amendment incorporated the Bill of Rights' protection in it; this view would later become law.

Murphy is perhaps best known for his vehement dissent from the court's ruling in Korematsu v. United States (1944), which upheld the constitutionality of the government's internment of Japanese-Americans during World War II. He sharply criticized the majority ruling as "legalization of racism."

This was the first time the word "racism" found its way into a Supreme Court opinion (Murphy had previously used the term twice in a concurring opinion in Steele v. Louisville & Nashville Railway Co. (1944) issued that same day). He would use that word again in five separate opinions before the word "racism" disappeared from Murphy's and the High Court's other opinions for almost two decades, not reappearing until the landmark decision of Loving v. Virginia (1967), which struck down as unconstitutional the Virginia anti-miscegenation statute. (See also Jim Crow laws.)

Although Murphy was serving on the Supreme Court during World War II, he still longed to be part of the war effort and so he served at Fort Benning, Georgia as an infantry officer during court recesses.

On January 30, 1944, almost exactly one year before Soviet liberation of the Auschwitz death camp on January 27, 1945, Justice Murphy unveiled the formation of the National Committee Against Nazi Persecution and Extermination of the Jews. Serving as committee chair, he declared that it was created to combat Nazi propaganda "breeding the germs of hatred against Jews." This announcement was made on the 11th anniversary of Adolf Hitler's appointment as Chancellor of Germany. The eleven committee members included U.S. Vice President Henry Wallace, 1940 Republican presidential candidate Wendell Willkie and Henry St. George Tucker, Presiding Bishop of the Protestant Episcopal Church.

Murphy was among 12 nominated at the 1944 Democratic National Convention to serve as Roosevelt's running mate in the presidential election that year. He acted as chairman of the National Committee against Nazi Persecution and Extermination of the Jews and of the Philippine War Relief Committee. The first committee was established in early 1944 to promote rescue of European Jews, and to combat antisemitism in the United States.

== Death and memory ==
Murphy died in his sleep at Henry Ford Hospital in Detroit on July 19, 1949, of a coronary thrombosis at the age of 59. Over 10,000 people attended his funeral in Detroit. He is buried in Our Lady of Lake Huron Catholic Cemetery in Sand Beach Township, Michigan, near Harbor Beach.

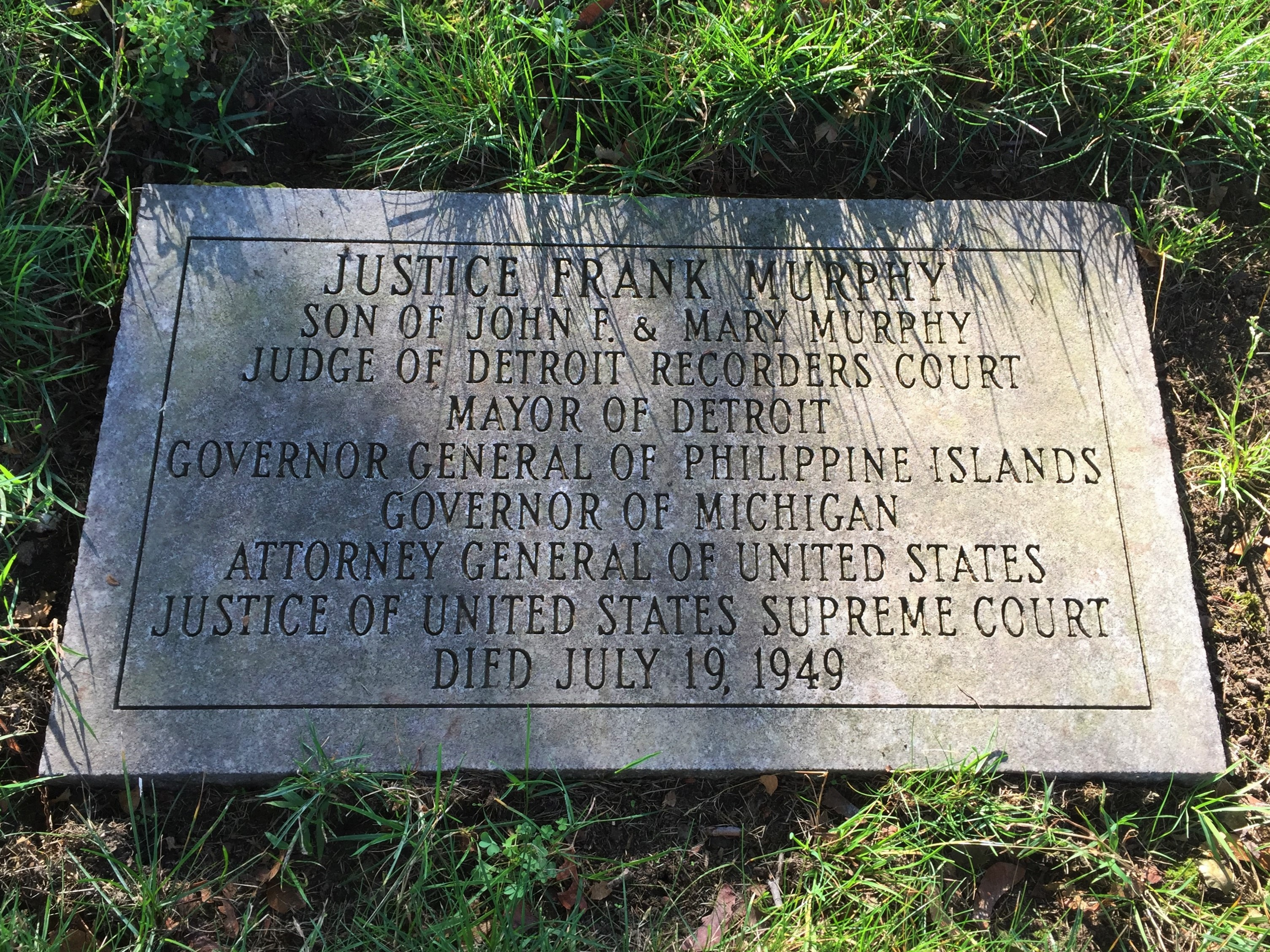
Justice Frank Murphy is buried at Our Lady of Lake Huron Catholic Cemetery in Sand Beach Township, Michigan, near Harbor Beach.

The Frank Murphy Hall of Justice was home to Detroit's Recorder's Court and now houses part of Michigan's Third Judicial Circuit Court. There is a plaque in his honor on the first floor, which is recognized as a Michigan Legal Milestone.

Outside the Hall of Justice is Carl Milles's statue "The Hand of God". This rendition was cast in honor of Murphy and financed by the United Automobile Workers. It features a nude figure emerging from the left hand of God. Although commissioned in 1949 and completed by 1953, the work, partly because of the male nudity involved, was kept in storage for a decade and a half. The work was chosen in tribute to Murphy by Walter P. Reuther and Ira W. Jayne. It was placed on a pedestal in 1970 with the help of sculptor Marshall Fredericks, who was a Milles student.

Murphy is also honored with a museum in his home town, Harbor Beach, Michigan. Housed at his former residence, it contains numerous personal artifacts from his life and career, most notably from the Philippines. The Murphy Museum is open during the summer months, by appointment.

Murphy's personal and official files are archived at the Bentley Historical Library of the University of Michigan in Ann Arbor and are open for research. This also includes an oral history project about Murphy. His correspondence and other official documents are deposited in libraries around the country.

In memory of Murphy, one of three University of Michigan Law School alumni to become a U.S. Supreme Court justice, Washington, D.C.–based attorney John H. Pickering, who was a law clerk for Murphy, donated a large sum of money to the law school as a remembrance, establishing the Frank Murphy Seminar Room.

Murphy was awarded an Honorary Doctorate of Law degree by the University of Michigan in 1939.

The University of Detroit has a Frank Murphy Honor Society.

The Sweet Trials: Malice Aforethought is a play written by Arthur Beer, based on the trials of Ossian and Henry Sweet, and derived from Kevin Boyle's Arc of Justice.

The Detroit Public Schools named Frank Murphy Elementary in his honor.

== Personal life ==
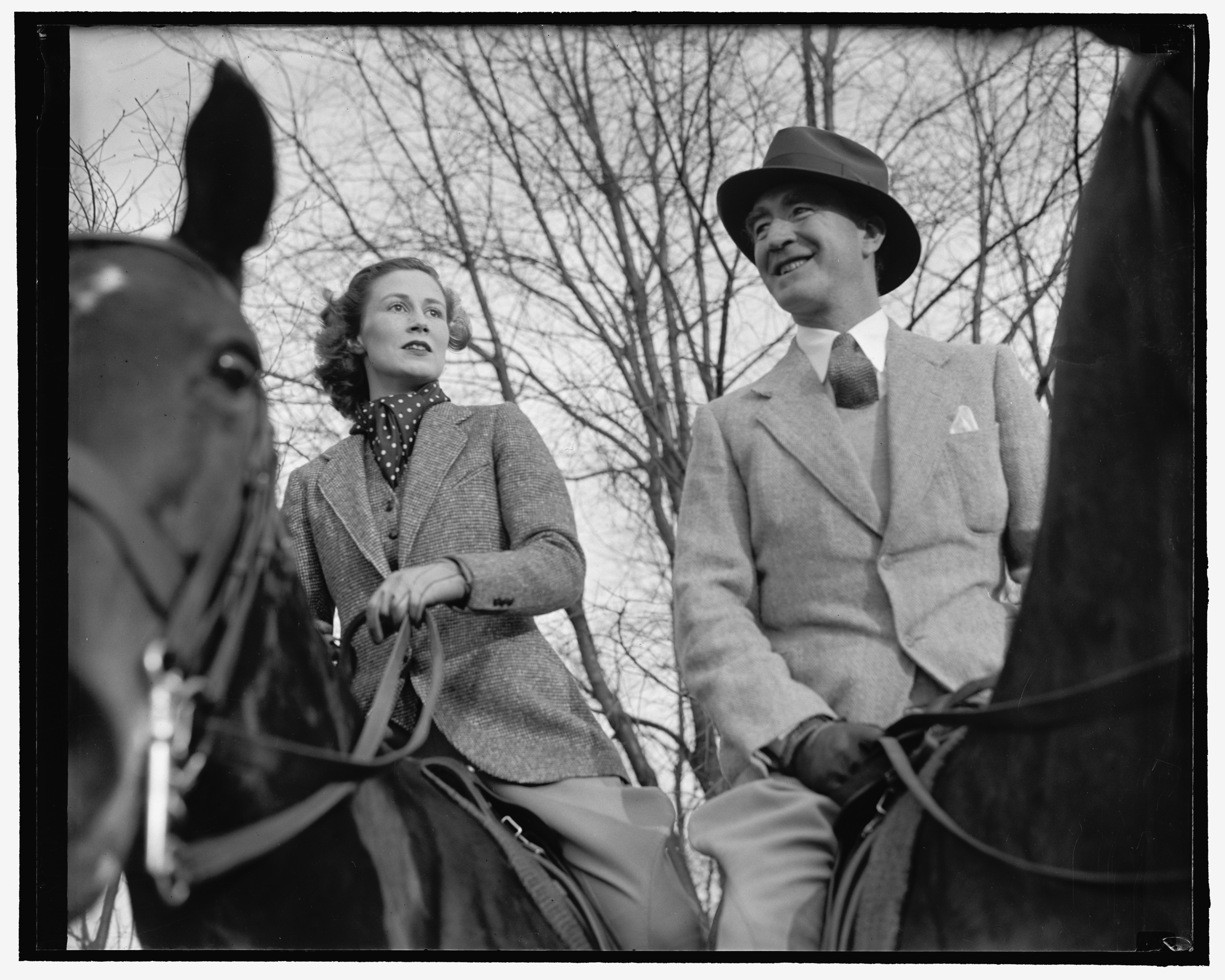
Attorney General Frank Murphy and Miss Ann Parker on March 24, 1939

Murphy never married or had children. He was the subject of "[r]umors of homosexuality [...] all his adult life". According to Courting Justice: Gay Men and Lesbians v. The Supreme Court:

[a] gay reading of [biographies of Murphy] suggests that Murphy's homosexuality was hiding in plain sight. For more than 40 years, Edward G. Kemp was Frank Murphy's devoted, trusted companion. Like Murphy, Kemp was a lifelong bachelor. From college until Murphy's death, the pair found creative ways to work and live together. [...] When Murphy appeared to have the better future in politics, Kemp stepped into a supportive, secondary role, much as Hillary Clinton would later do for Bill Clinton.

As well as Murphy's close relationship with Kemp, Murphy's biographer, historian Sidney Fine, found in Murphy's personal papers a letter that "if the words mean what they say, refers to a homosexual encounter some years earlier between Murphy and the writer." The writer of the letter implied that he and Murphy had become lovers while Murphy was governor-general and congratulated Murphy on his appointment to the Supreme Court.

Murphy did have at least two female companions of note. Ann Parker was frequently seen horseback riding with Murphy in Washington during his tenure as U.S. Attorney General, leading to speculation of a romance in the press. At the time of his death, Murphy was engaged to Joan Cuddihy; the wedding was scheduled for the following month.

== See also ==
- Demographics of the Supreme Court of the United States
- Ford Hunger March
- List of justices of the Supreme Court of the United States
- List of United States Supreme Court justices by time in office
- List of University of Michigan law and government alumni
- United States Supreme Court cases during the Hughes Court
- United States Supreme Court cases during the Stone Court
- United States Supreme Court cases during the Vinson Court

== Bibliography ==
=== General ===
- Kevin Boyle (April 19, 2005). Arc of Justice: A Saga of Race, Civil Rights, and Murder in the Jazz Age. Holt Paperbacks. ISBN 978-0-8050-7933-3.
- Sidney Fine (1975). Frank Murphy. University of Michigan Press. ISBN 978-0-472-32949-6. (Note: This and a number of other books on Murphy by Fine are part of a list of 50 "essential" Michigan history books selected by noted historians. "50 essential Michigan History books". Michigan Department of History, Arts and Libraries. Archived from the original on November 16, 2011.)
- Melvin G. Holli (1999). The American Mayor: the best & the worst big-city leaders. Pennsylvania State University Press. ISBN 978-0-271-01877-5.
- Howard, J. Woodford, Mr. Justice Murphy: A Political Biography (Princeton, N.J.: Princeton University Press, 1968).
- Greg Zipes. Justice and Faith: The Frank Murphy Story. Ann Arbor: University of Michigan Press, 2021.

=== Notes ===
Political offices
Preceded by Charles Bowles	Mayor of Detroit; 1930–1933	Succeeded by Frank Couzens
Preceded by Ted Roosevelt	Governor-General of the Philippines; 1933–1935	Succeeded by Manuel Quezon as President of the Philippines
Preceded by Frank Fitzgerald	Governor of Michigan; 1937–1939	Succeeded by Frank Fitzgerald
Diplomatic posts
New office	High Commissioner to the Philippines; 1935–1936	Succeeded by Weldon Jones; Acting
Party political offices
Preceded by Arthur Lacy	Democratic nominee for Governor of Michigan; 1936, 1938	Succeeded by Murray Van Wagoner
Legal offices
Preceded by Homer Cummings	United States Attorney General; 1939–1940	Succeeded by Robert Jackson
Preceded by Pierce Butler	Associate Justice of the Supreme Court of the United States; 1940–1949	Succeeded by Tom Clark
