= John Wesley Fitzgerald (politician, born 1990) =

American politician and Democratic Minority Floor Leader (born 1990)

John W. Fitzgerald
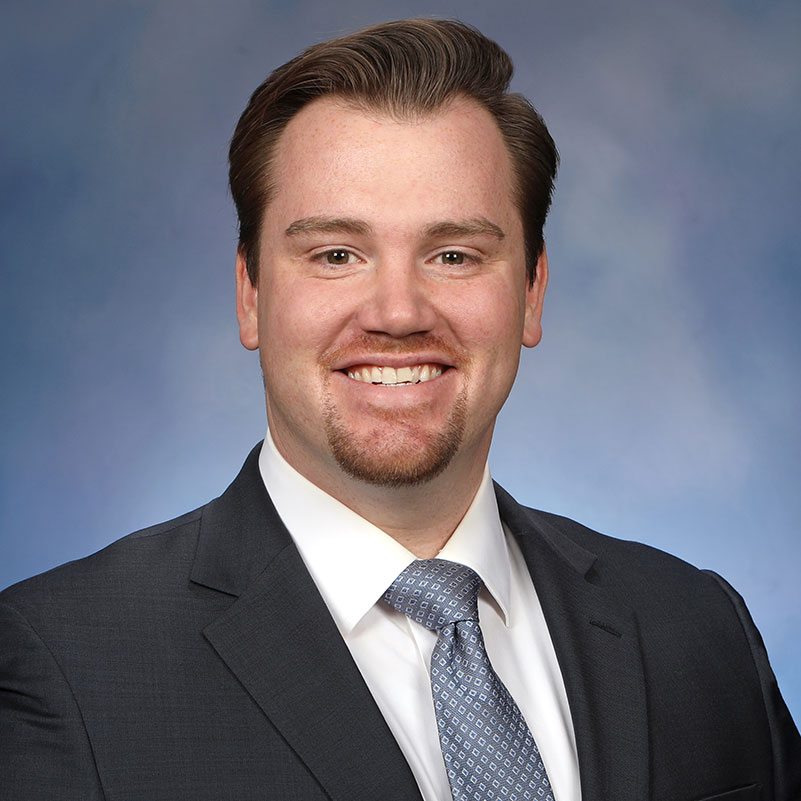
- Official portrait, 2023

Democratic Minority Floor Leader of the Michigan House of Representatives
- Incumbent
- Assumed office January 1, 2025
- Leader: Ranjeev Puri

Member of the Michigan House of Representatives from the 83rd district
- Incumbent
- Assumed office January 1, 2023
- Preceded by: Andrew Beeler

Personal details
- Born: September 26, 1990 (age 35) Grand Ledge, Michigan, U.S.
- Party: Democratic
- Spouse: Kellie Fitzgerald
- Children: 1
- Education: Michigan State University (BA)
- Website: Official Website

John Wesley Fitzgerald (born September 26, 1990) is an American politician serving in the Michigan House of Representatives from the 83rd district since 2023. Since January 2025, he has served as Democratic Minority Floor Leader of the Michigan House of Representatives.

Fitzgerald was first elected to the Michigan House in 2022 when he defeated Lisa DeKryger. He won re-election in 2024, defeating former state representative Tommy Brann.

Fitzgerald lives in Wyoming, Michigan, with his wife and daughter.

== Early life, education, and career ==
Fitzgerald grew up in Grand Ledge, Michigan. He graduated from Grand Ledge High School. His mother is an ordained minister and his father, Frank Fitzgerald, was an attorney and member of the Michigan House of Representatives from 1987 to 1998.

Fitzgerald graduated from Michigan State University with a degree in history.

Before being elected to office, Fitzgerald worked as an account executive in the insurance industry.

== Political career ==
=== Wyoming City Council ===
Fitzgerald served on the Wyoming City Council from 2021 to 2022 as member-at-large. He was elected in 2020 with 55.12% of the vote.

=== Michigan House of Representatives ===
Fitzgerald represents the 83rd district in the Michigan House of Representatives, which includes portions of Wyoming, Grand Rapids, and Byron Township.

Following the 2024 election, House Democrats elected Fitzgerald as Democratic Minority Floor Leader. Fitzgerald said, "Now we have an opportunity to really build on the lessons learned as individual members and also as a leadership team."

Fitzgerald was elected in 2022 with 52.62% of the vote against Lisa DeKryger, who received 44.53% of the vote.

He won re-election in 2024 with 53.1% of the vote against former state representative Tommy Brann, who received 46.9% of the vote.

==== Committee assignments (2025–2026) ====
- Government Operations (Minority Vice Chair)
- Insurance
- House Fiscal Governing

==== Committee assignments (2023–2024) ====
- Agriculture
- Health Policy
- Insurance and Financial Services
- Local Government and Municipal Finance (Chair)
- Transportation, Mobility and Infrastructure
