= 1932 Michigan gubernatorial election =

- November 8, 1932
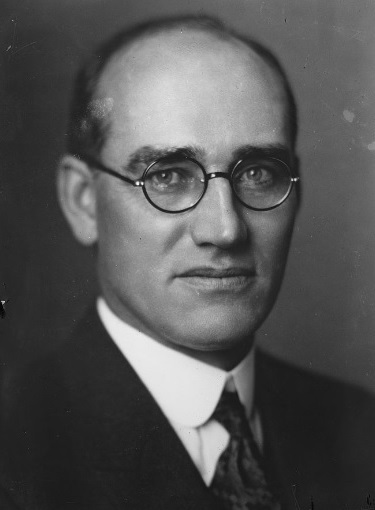

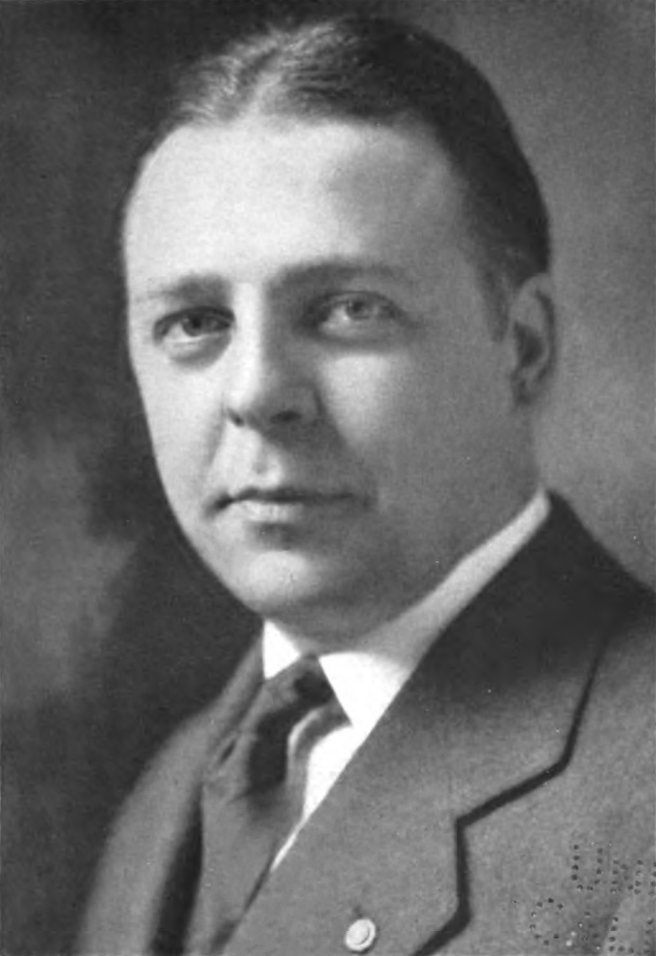
Nominee	William Comstock	Wilber M. Brucker
Party	Democratic	Republican
Popular vote	887,672	696,935
Percentage	54.92%	43.12%
- County results Comstock: 40–50% 50–60% 60–70% Brucker: 40–50% 50–60% 60–70% 70–80%
Governor before election
Wilber M. Brucker
Republican
Elected Governor
William Comstock
Democratic

The 1932 Michigan gubernatorial election was held on November 8, 1932. In a rematch of the previous election, Democratic nominee William Comstock defeated incumbent Republican Wilber M. Brucker with 54.92% of the vote. Comstock was finally elected governor after his fourth consecutive nomination by the Democratic Party.

== Primary election ==
Michigan held primary elections on September 13, 1932.

=== Republican party ===
Incumbent governor Wilber M. Brucker won renomination against divided opposition.

==== Candidates ====
- Orla A. Bailey, farmer from Shiawassee County
- Wilber M. Brucker, incumbent governor
- William H. McKeighan, mayor of Flint
- James C. Quinlan, attorney from Grand Rapids
- George W. Welsh, former Lieutenant Governor of Michigan

==== Results ====
Republican primary results
Party	Candidate	Votes	%
Republican	Wilber M. Brucker (inc.)	341,992	47.75%
Republican	George W. Welsh	212,522	29.67%
Republican	William H. McKeighan	135,978	18.99%
Republican	Orla A. Bailey	13,195	1.84%
Republican	James C. Quinlan	12,541	1.75%
Total votes		716,228	100.00%

=== Democratic party ===
For the fourth consecutive election, the Democratic party nominated William Comstock for governor.

==== Candidates ====
- Claude S. Carney, attorney from Kalamazoo
- William Comstock, Democratic nominee for governor in 1926, 1928, and 1930
- Patrick H. O'Brien, former judge

=== Democratic primary ===
Democratic primary results
Party	Candidate	Votes	%
Democratic	William Comstock	249,835	75.52%
Democratic	Patrick H. O'Brien	55,828	16.88%
Democratic	Claude S. Carney	25,173	7.61%
Total votes		330,836	100.00%

== General election ==
=== Candidates ===
Major party candidates

- William Comstock, Democratic
- Wilber M. Brucker, Republican

Other candidates

- John Panzer, Socialist
- William Reynolds, Communist
- Charles Elwood Holmes, Prohibition
- Robert Fraser, Socialist Labor
- Al Renner, Proletarian
- Anthony Bergman, Liberty

=== Results ===
1932 Michigan gubernatorial election
Party	Candidate	Votes	%	±%
Democratic	William Comstock	887,672	54.92%	+12.89%
Republican	Wilber M. Brucker (inc.)	696,935	43.12%	−13.76%
Socialist	John Panzer	20,108	1.24%	+0.79%
Communist	William Reynolds	7,906	0.49%	+0.02%
Prohibition	Charles Elwood Holmes	2,031	0.13%	−0.03%
Socialist Labor	Robert Fraser	1,107	0.07%	
Proletarian	Al Renner	318	0.02%	
Liberty	Anthony Bergman	182	0.01%	
	Scattering	3	0.00%	
Majority		190,737	11.80%	
Total votes		1,616,262	100.00%	
Democratic gain from Republican		Swing	+26.65%	

==== Results by county ====
This election broke several long streaks of Republican dominance in various counties. In particular, Dickinson County and Lake County voted Democratic for the first time ever. Additionally, despite having never voted previously Democratic since its organization in 1891, Dickinson County would continue to vote Democratic in every subsequent gubernatorial election until 1964. This would also be the last time until the 1970s and 1980s that a number of counties voted Democratic. In particular, all of the following counties would not vote Democratic again until 1986: Berrien, Branch, Cass, Clinton, Eaton, Grand Traverse, Gratiot, Ionia, Isabella, Jackson, Lenawee, Livingston, Midland, Montcalm, Oceana, Otsego, and St. Joseph.

County	William Comstock Democratic		Wilber M. Brucker Republican		John Panzer Socialist		William Reynolds Communist		Charles Elwood Holmes Prohibition		All Others Various		Margin		Total votes cast
County	#	%	#	%	#	%	#	%	#	%	#	%	#	%	Total votes cast
Alcona	824	46.66%	892	50.51%	46	2.60%	0	0.00%	3	0.17%	1	0.06%	-68	-3.85%	1,766
Alger	2,034	56.37%	1,388	38.47%	45	1.25%	134	3.71%	3	0.08%	4	0.11%	646	17.90%	3,608
Allegan	6,326	42.71%	8,314	56.13%	113	0.76%	18	0.12%	32	0.22%	9	0.06%	-1,988	-13.42%	14,812
Alpena	3,970	57.54%	2,825	40.95%	89	1.29%	4	0.06%	8	0.12%	3	0.04%	1,145	16.60%	6,899
Antrim	1,625	40.18%	2,307	57.05%	94	2.32%	4	0.10%	9	0.22%	5	0.12%	-682	-16.86%	4,044
Arenac	1,958	55.45%	1,502	42.54%	49	1.39%	10	0.28%	7	0.20%	5	0.14%	456	12.91%	3,531
Baraga	2,000	49.84%	1,882	46.90%	8	0.20%	117	2.92%	1	0.02%	5	0.12%	118	2.94%	4,013
Barry	4,210	46.04%	4,805	52.54%	88	0.96%	1	0.01%	33	0.36%	8	0.09%	-595	-6.51%	9,145
Bay	14,930	60.73%	9,352	38.04%	281	1.14%	3	0.01%	10	0.04%	7	0.03%	5,578	22.69%	24,583
Benzie	1,345	43.65%	1,645	53.39%	56	1.82%	9	0.29%	6	0.19%	20	0.65%	-300	-9.74%	3,081
Berrien	17,944	55.66%	13,923	43.19%	265	0.82%	28	0.09%	47	0.15%	30	0.09%	4,021	12.47%	32,237
Branch	5,408	52.14%	4,811	46.38%	82	0.79%	1	0.01%	64	0.62%	7	0.07%	597	5.76%	10,373
Calhoun	16,164	49.51%	15,905	48.72%	484	1.48%	25	0.08%	53	0.16%	14	0.04%	259	0.79%	32,645
Cass	4,607	49.82%	4,481	48.45%	109	1.18%	8	0.09%	27	0.29%	16	0.17%	126	1.36%	9,248
Charlevoix	2,172	41.78%	2,806	53.97%	203	3.90%	2	0.04%	5	0.10%	11	0.21%	-634	-12.19%	5,199
Cheboygan	3,369	58.64%	2,338	40.70%	23	0.40%	7	0.12%	5	0.09%	3	0.05%	1,031	17.95%	5,745
Chippewa	4,022	42.63%	5,279	55.95%	43	0.46%	68	0.72%	12	0.13%	11	0.12%	-1,257	-13.32%	9,435
Clare	1,810	55.03%	1,412	42.93%	58	1.76%	3	0.09%	4	0.12%	2	0.06%	398	12.10%	3,289
Clinton	4,859	50.11%	4,793	49.43%	26	0.27%	0	0.00%	17	0.18%	2	0.02%	66	0.68%	9,697
Crawford	793	60.81%	498	38.19%	10	0.77%	1	0.08%	2	0.15%	0	0.00%	295	22.62%	1,304
Delta	6,854	57.82%	4,647	39.20%	288	2.43%	58	0.49%	2	0.02%	6	0.05%	2,207	18.62%	11,855
Dickinson	6,698	56.86%	4,790	40.66%	207	1.76%	69	0.59%	7	0.06%	9	0.08%	1,908	16.20%	11,780
Eaton	6,751	51.84%	5,975	45.88%	227	1.74%	3	0.02%	50	0.38%	16	0.12%	776	5.96%	13,022
Emmet	2,936	47.30%	3,046	49.07%	199	3.21%	0	0.00%	17	0.27%	9	0.14%	-110	-1.77%	6,207
Genesee	39,181	58.91%	26,161	39.33%	932	1.40%	103	0.15%	68	0.10%	64	0.10%	13,020	19.58%	66,509
Gladwin	1,589	51.83%	1,432	46.71%	36	1.17%	3	0.10%	2	0.07%	4	0.13%	157	5.12%	3,066
Gogebic	4,826	44.22%	5,611	51.42%	101	0.93%	351	3.22%	12	0.11%	12	0.11%	-785	-7.19%	10,913
Grand Traverse	3,644	49.62%	3,608	49.13%	69	0.94%	7	0.10%	11	0.15%	5	0.07%	36	0.49%	7,344
Gratiot	6,231	55.05%	4,954	43.77%	71	0.63%	5	0.04%	51	0.45%	7	0.06%	1,277	11.28%	11,319
Hillsdale	5,594	49.11%	5,692	49.97%	45	0.40%	20	0.18%	37	0.32%	2	0.02%	-98	-0.86%	11,390
Houghton	8,062	39.53%	11,861	58.15%	87	0.43%	338	1.66%	22	0.11%	27	0.13%	-3,799	-18.63%	20,397
Huron	5,621	49.07%	5,698	49.74%	107	0.93%	7	0.06%	15	0.13%	7	0.06%	-77	-0.67%	11,455
Ingham	22,499	50.95%	21,044	47.65%	495	1.12%	22	0.05%	63	0.14%	38	0.09%	1,455	3.29%	44,161
Ionia	8,379	56.42%	6,267	42.20%	157	1.06%	0	0.00%	38	0.26%	10	0.07%	2,112	14.22%	14,851
Iosco	1,483	46.74%	1,624	51.18%	52	1.64%	6	0.19%	4	0.13%	4	0.13%	-141	-4.44%	3,173
Iron	3,602	45.76%	3,948	50.15%	34	0.43%	273	3.47%	6	0.08%	9	0.11%	-346	-4.40%	7,872
Isabella	4,272	49.94%	4,199	49.08%	42	0.49%	4	0.05%	34	0.40%	4	0.05%	73	0.85%	8,555
Jackson	17,776	53.14%	15,103	45.15%	353	1.06%	99	0.30%	62	0.19%	60	0.18%	2,673	7.99%	33,453
Kalamazoo	13,458	40.91%	18,712	56.88%	415	1.26%	154	0.47%	117	0.36%	41	0.12%	-5,254	-15.97%	32,897
Kalkaska	543	38.84%	755	54.01%	87	6.22%	0	0.00%	11	0.79%	2	0.14%	-212	-15.16%	1,398
Kent	44,641	52.94%	38,066	45.14%	1,098	1.30%	266	0.32%	96	0.11%	155	0.18%	6,575	7.80%	84,322
Keweenaw	534	28.34%	1,339	71.07%	1	0.05%	8	0.42%	1	0.05%	1	0.05%	-805	-42.73%	1,884
Lake	1,157	51.58%	1,044	46.54%	25	1.11%	17	0.76%	0	0.00%	0	0.00%	113	5.04%	2,243
Lapeer	4,344	47.40%	4,722	51.53%	61	0.67%	8	0.09%	24	0.26%	5	0.05%	-378	-4.12%	9,164
Leelanau	1,551	48.08%	1,653	51.24%	14	0.43%	3	0.09%	4	0.12%	1	0.03%	-102	-3.16%	3,226
Lenawee	10,501	49.82%	10,458	49.61%	78	0.37%	2	0.01%	30	0.14%	10	0.05%	43	0.20%	21,079
Livingston	4,854	52.20%	4,363	46.92%	55	0.59%	1	0.01%	24	0.26%	1	0.01%	491	5.28%	9,298
Luce	836	38.12%	1,317	60.05%	11	0.50%	23	1.05%	4	0.18%	2	0.09%	-481	-21.93%	2,193
Mackinac	2,402	59.41%	1,621	40.09%	15	0.37%	1	0.02%	1	0.02%	3	0.07%	781	19.32%	4,043
Macomb	16,731	65.30%	8,417	32.85%	289	1.13%	125	0.49%	31	0.12%	27	0.11%	8,314	32.45%	25,620
Manistee	4,355	54.99%	3,323	41.96%	186	2.35%	26	0.33%	20	0.25%	10	0.13%	1,032	13.03%	7,920
Marquette	7,061	41.69%	9,471	55.92%	133	0.79%	237	1.40%	17	0.10%	18	0.11%	-2,410	-14.23%	16,937
Mason	3,691	51.93%	3,209	45.15%	146	2.05%	41	0.58%	15	0.21%	5	0.07%	482	6.78%	7,107
Mecosta	3,057	46.69%	3,398	51.90%	48	0.73%	5	0.08%	15	0.23%	24	0.37%	-341	-5.21%	6,547
Menominee	5,637	61.40%	3,407	37.11%	106	1.15%	22	0.24%	5	0.05%	4	0.04%	2,230	24.29%	9,181
Midland	4,088	55.79%	3,171	43.27%	53	0.72%	0	0.00%	10	0.14%	6	0.08%	917	12.51%	7,328
Missaukee	1,188	43.17%	1,526	55.45%	19	0.69%	2	0.07%	15	0.55%	2	0.07%	-338	-12.28%	2,752
Monroe	12,117	61.97%	7,257	37.11%	125	0.64%	21	0.11%	23	0.12%	11	0.06%	4,860	24.85%	19,554
Montcalm	5,441	48.82%	5,315	47.69%	333	2.99%	1	0.01%	43	0.39%	13	0.12%	126	1.13%	11,146
Montmorency	965	61.98%	559	35.90%	29	1.86%	2	0.13%	1	0.06%	1	0.06%	406	26.08%	1,557
Muskegon	14,098	54.16%	11,373	43.69%	296	1.14%	209	0.80%	31	0.12%	25	0.10%	2,725	10.47%	26,032
Newaygo	3,357	48.79%	3,389	49.25%	105	1.53%	11	0.16%	15	0.22%	4	0.06%	-32	-0.47%	6,881
Oakland	37,583	55.90%	28,359	42.18%	951	1.41%	199	0.30%	72	0.11%	65	0.10%	9,224	13.72%	67,229
Oceana	3,076	56.54%	2,288	42.06%	39	0.72%	7	0.13%	21	0.39%	9	0.17%	788	14.49%	5,440
Ogemaw	1,514	48.81%	1,539	49.61%	35	1.13%	2	0.06%	10	0.32%	2	0.06%	-25	-0.81%	3,102
Ontonagon	2,220	45.39%	2,324	47.52%	32	0.65%	300	6.13%	5	0.10%	10	0.20%	-104	-2.13%	4,891
Osceola	2,248	42.14%	3,043	57.04%	29	0.54%	5	0.09%	10	0.19%	0	0.00%	-795	-14.90%	5,335
Oscoda	262	35.17%	478	64.16%	1	0.13%	0	0.00%	4	0.54%	0	0.00%	-216	-28.99%	745
Otsego	1,306	53.88%	1,017	41.96%	98	4.04%	0	0.00%	1	0.04%	2	0.08%	289	11.92%	2,424
Ottawa	8,764	44.80%	10,468	53.51%	285	1.46%	14	0.07%	24	0.12%	6	0.03%	-1,704	-8.71%	19,561
Presque Isle	2,369	63.19%	1,325	35.34%	42	1.12%	4	0.11%	4	0.11%	5	0.13%	1,044	27.85%	3,749
Roscommon	812	59.66%	515	37.84%	24	1.76%	4	0.29%	3	0.22%	3	0.22%	297	21.82%	1,361
Saginaw	23,168	56.27%	17,388	42.23%	497	1.21%	43	0.10%	44	0.11%	30	0.07%	5,780	14.04%	41,170
Sanilac	4,116	37.03%	6,861	61.72%	106	0.95%	2	0.02%	29	0.26%	2	0.02%	-2,745	-24.69%	11,116
Schoolcraft	1,634	48.26%	1,675	49.47%	65	1.92%	1	0.03%	6	0.18%	5	0.15%	-41	-1.21%	3,386
Shiawassee	7,504	53.20%	6,414	45.47%	127	0.90%	4	0.03%	49	0.35%	8	0.06%	1,090	7.73%	14,106
St. Clair	13,363	48.44%	14,012	50.80%	181	0.66%	7	0.03%	19	0.07%	2	0.01%	-649	-2.35%	27,584
St. Joseph	6,267	49.75%	6,169	48.98%	116	0.92%	1	0.01%	38	0.30%	5	0.04%	98	0.78%	12,596
Tuscola	4,913	44.46%	6,039	54.65%	71	0.64%	5	0.05%	18	0.16%	5	0.05%	-1,126	-10.19%	11,051
Van Buren	6,708	47.11%	7,288	51.18%	205	1.44%	9	0.06%	26	0.18%	4	0.03%	-580	-4.07%	14,240
Washtenaw	13,848	48.32%	14,292	49.87%	425	1.48%	58	0.20%	22	0.08%	16	0.06%	-444	-1.55%	28,661
Wayne	319,985	61.59%	187,183	36.03%	7,329	1.41%	4,241	0.82%	209	0.04%	601	0.12%	132,802	25.56%	519,548
Wexford	3,037	45.45%	3,575	53.50%	48	0.72%	4	0.06%	15	0.22%	3	0.04%	-538	-8.05%	6,682
Total	887,672	54.92%	696,935	43.12%	20,108	1.24%	7,906	0.49%	2,031	0.13%	1,610	0.10%	190,737	11.80%	1,616,262

===== Counties that flipped from Republican to Democratic =====
- Alger
- Alpena
- Arenac
- Baraga
- Bay
- Berrien
- Branch
- Calhoun
- Cass
- Cheboygan
- Clare
- Clinton
- Crawford
- Delta
- Dickinson
- Eaton
- Genesee
- Gladwin
- Grand Traverse
- Gratiot
- Ingham
- Ionia
- Isabella
- Jackson
- Kent
- Lake
- Lenawee
- Livingston
- Mackinac
- Manistee
- Mason
- Menominee
- Midland
- Montcalm
- Montmorency
- Muskegon
- Oakland
- Oceana
- Otsego
- Presque Isle
- Roscommon
- Saginaw
- Shiawassee
- St. Joseph
