= 1928 United States gubernatorial elections =

- November 6, 1928; September 10, 1928 (ME)

35 governorships
	Majority party	Minority party
Party	Republican	Democratic
Seats before	27	21
Seats after	30	18
Seat change	▲3	▼3
Seats up	21	14
Seats won	24	11
- Democratic hold Republican gain Republican hold

United States gubernatorial elections were held in 1928, in 35 states, concurrent with the House, Senate elections and presidential election, on November 6, 1928. Elections took place on September 10 in Maine.

Among the most notable results was in New York where 1932 Democratic nominee and future president Franklin D. Roosevelt narrowly won in New York. Current Governor Al Smith contested the presidential election.

== Results ==
State	Incumbent	Party	Status	Opposing candidates
Arizona	George W. P. Hunt	Democratic	Defeated, 48.16%	John C. Phillips (Republican) 51.71% William O'Brien (Workers) 0.13%
Arkansas	Harvey J. Parnell	Democratic	Re-elected, 77.31%	Drew Bowers (Republican) 22.69%
Colorado	William H. Adams	Democratic	Re-elected, 67.05%	William Louis Boatright (Republican) 31.85% Samuel A. Garth (Socialist) 0.52% Vera Jane Pease (Farmer Labor) 0.34% George J. Saul (Workers) 0.24%
Connecticut	John H. Trumbull	Republican	Re-elected, 53.57%	Charles G. Morris (Democratic) 45.61% Jasper McLevy (Socialist) 0.58% William Mackenzie (Farmer Labor) 0.14% Michael P. O'Lean (Socialist Labor) 0.11%
Delaware	Robert P. Robinson	Republican	Retired, Republican victory	C. Douglass Buck (Republican) 61.23% Charles M. Wharton (Democratic) 38.77%
Florida	John W. Martin	Democratic	Term-limited, Democratic victory	Doyle E. Carlton (Democratic) 60.97% W. J. Howey (Republican) 39.03%
Georgia	Lamartine G. Hardman	Democratic	Re-elected, 100.00%	(Democratic primary results); Lamartine G. Hardman 58.54% Eurith D. Rivers 41.46%
Idaho	H. C. Baldridge	Republican	Re-elected, 57.82%	C. Ben Ross (Democratic) 41.58% Thomas J. Coonrod (Socialist) 0.60%
Illinois	Len Small	Republican	Defeated in Republican primary, Republican victory	Louis L. Emmerson (Republican) 56.76% Floyd E. Thompson (Democratic) 42.66% George Koop (Socialist) 0.43% William F. Kruse (Communist) 0.11% J. E. Procum (Socialist Labor) 0.05%
Indiana	Edward L. Jackson	Republican	Term-limited, Republican victory	Harry G. Leslie (Republican) 51.25% Frank C. Dailey (Democratic) 48.10% Albert Stanley (Prohibition) 0.36% Clarence E. Bond (Socialist) 0.23% Cassimer Benward (Socialist Labor) 0.03% Harry W. Garner (Workers) 0.02% Henry O. Shaw (National) 0.01%
Iowa	John Hammill	Republican	Re-elected, 62.79%	L. W. Housel (Democratic) 37.21%
Kansas	Benjamin S. Paulen	Republican	Retired, Republican victory	Clyde M. Reed (Republican) 65.60% Chauncey B. Little (Democratic) 33.20% Henry L. Peterson (Socialist) 1.20%
Maine (held, 10 September 1928)	Owen Brewster	Republican	Retired to run for U.S. Senate, Republican victory	William T. Gardiner (Republican) 69.31% Edward C. Moran Jr. (Democratic) 30.70%
Massachusetts	Alvan T. Fuller	Republican	Retired, Republican victory	Frank G. Allen (Republican) 50.06% Charles H. Cole (Democratic) 48.81% Mary Donovan Hapgood (Socialist) 0.49% Chester W. Bixby (Workers) 0.29% Washington Cook (Prohibition) 0.20% Stephen Surridge (Socialist Labor) 0.09% Edith Hamilton MacFadden (Independent) 0.06%
Michigan	Fred W. Green	Republican	Re-elected, 69.94%	William A. Comstock (Democratic) 29.44% Guy H. Lockwood (Socialist) 0.21% Ervin D. Brooks (Prohibition) 0.19% William Reynolds (Communist) 0.19% Paul Dinger (Socialist Labor) 0.05%
Minnesota	Theodore Christianson	Republican	Re-elected, 55.00%	Ernest Lundeen (Farmer-Labor) 22.72% Andrew Nelson (Democratic) 21.38% J. O. Bentall (Communist) 0.58% Harris A. Brandborg (Industrial) 0.33%
Missouri	Samuel Aaron Baker	Republican	Term-limited, Republican victory	Henry S. Caulfield (Republican) 51.63% Francis M. Wilson (Democratic) 48.17% Joseph G. Hodges (Socialist) 0.16% W. G. Brandenburg (Prohibition) 0.03% Edward G. Middlecoff (Socialist Labor) 0.02%
Montana	John E. Erickson	Democratic	Re-elected, 58.65%	Wellington D. Rankin (Republican) 40.95% W. R. Duncan (Socialist) 0.40%
Nebraska	Adam McMullen	Republican	Retired, Republican victory	Arthur J. Weaver (Republican) 56.98% Charles W. Bryan (Democratic) 42.63% F. Phillip Haffner (Socialist) 0.39%
New Hampshire	Huntley N. Spaulding	Republican	Retired, Republican victory	Charles W. Tobey (Republican) 57.50% Eaton D. Sargent (Democratic) 42.32% Frank T. Butler (Socialist) 0.11% Henry C. Iram (Workers) 0.07%
New Jersey	A. Harry Moore	Democratic	Term-limited, Republican victory	Morgan F. Larson (Republican) 54.88% William L. Dill (Democratic) 44.74% Eugene A. Smith (National Prohibition) 0.14% W. K. Tallman (Socialist) 0.14% Scott Nearing (Workers) 0.08% John C. Butterworth (Socialist Labor) 0.02%
New Mexico	Richard C. Dillon	Republican	Re-elected, 55.61%	Robert C. Dow (Democratic) 44.30% John W. Blackburn (Independent) 0.08%
New York	Alfred E. Smith	Democratic	Retired to run for U.S. President, Democratic hold	Franklin D. Roosevelt (Democratic) 48.96% Albert Ottinger (Republican) 48.36% Louis Waldman (Socialist) 2.34% William F. Dunne (Workers) 0.25% Charles Hunter Corregan (Socialist Labor) 0.10%
North Carolina	Angus Wilton McLean	Democratic	Term-limited, Democratic victory	O. Max Gardner (Democratic) 55.57% Herbert F. Seawell (Republican) 44.43%
North Dakota	Walter Jeremiah Maddock	Republican	Ran for re-election as a Democrat, defeated, 43.15%	George F. Shafer (Republican) 56.50% K. P. Loesch (Farmer Labor) 0.36%
Ohio	A. Victor Donahey	Democratic	Retired, Republican victory	Myers Y. Cooper (Republican) 54.79% Martin L. Davey (Democratic) 44.74% Joseph W. Sharts (Socialist) 0.29% William Patterson (Communist) 0.09% John D. Goerke (Socialist Labor) 0.05% Frank W. Stanton (Prohibition) 0.04%
Rhode Island	Norman S. Case	Republican	Re-elected, 51.59%	Alberic A. Archambault (Democratic) 48.13% Charles F. Bishop (Socialist Labor) 0.16% Edward W. Theinert (Workers) 0.12%
South Dakota	William J. Bulow	Democratic	Re-elected, 52.48%	Buell F. Jones (Republican) 46.94% John G. Sumption (Farmer Labor) 0.58%
Tennessee	Henry H. Horton	Democratic	Re-elected, 61.06%	Raleigh Hopkins (Republican) 38.95%
Texas	Daniel Moody	Democratic	Re-elected, 82.43%	W. H. Holmes (Republican) 17.44% L. L. Rhodes (Socialist) 0.11% J. Stedham (Communist) 0.02%
Utah	George H. Dern	Democratic	Re-elected, 58.50%	William H. Wattis (Republican) 41.08% D. C. Dora (Socialist) 0.42%
Vermont	John Eliakim Weeks	Republican	Re-elected, 73.53%	Harry C. Shurtleff (Democratic) 25.98% Frank M. Post (Prohibition) 0.47% Scattering 0.02%
Washington	Roland Hill Hartley	Republican	Re-elected, 56.22%	A. Scott Bullitt (Democratic) 42.73% James F. Stark (Socialist Labor) 0.67% Walter Price (Socialist) 0.25% Aaron Fislerman (Communist) 0.14%
West Virginia	Howard M. Gore	Republican	Term-limited, Republican victory	William Gustavus Conley (Republican) 53.73% J. Alfred Taylor (Democratic) 46.10% J. H. Snider (Socialist) 0.18%
Wisconsin	Fred R. Zimmerman	Republican	Defeated in Republican primary, Republican victory	Walter J. Kohler Sr. (Republican) 55.38% Albert George Schmedeman (Democratic) 39.87% Otto R. Hauser (Socialist) 3.73% Adolph R. Bucknam (Prohibition) 0.66% Joseph Ehrhardt (Socialist Labor) 0.20% Alvar J. Hayes (Communist) 0.14% Scattering 0.03%

== See also ==
- 1928 United States elections
  - 1928 United States presidential election
  - 1928 United States Senate elections
  - 1928 United States House of Representatives elections
