= 1930 Michigan gubernatorial election =

- November 4, 1930
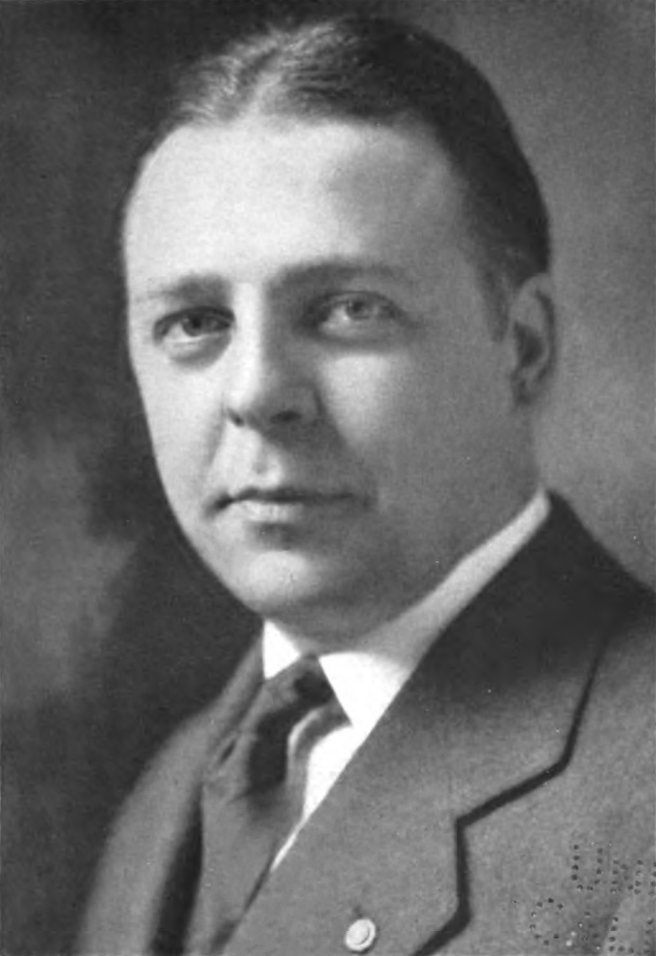

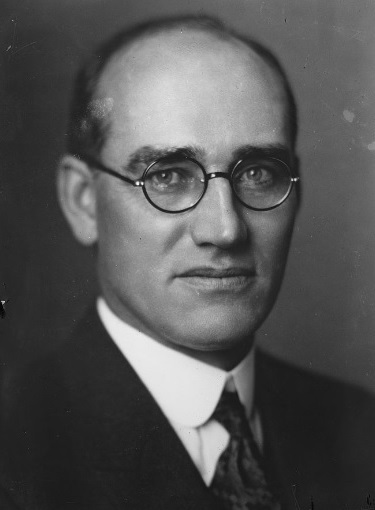
Nominee	Wilber M. Brucker	William Comstock
Party	Republican	Democratic
Popular vote	483,990	357,664
Percentage	56.88%	42.03%
- County results Brucker: 40–50% 50–60% 60–70% 70–80% 80–90% >90% Comstock: 40–50% 50–60%
Governor before election
Fred W. Green
Republican
Elected Governor
Wilber M. Brucker
Republican

The 1930 Michigan gubernatorial election was held on November 4, 1930. Republican nominee Wilber M. Brucker defeated Democratic nominee William Comstock with 56.88% of the vote.

== Primary election ==
Michigan held primary elections on September 9, 1930.

=== Republican party ===
Attorney General Wilber M. Brucker narrowly defeated former governor Alex J. Groesbeck for the Republican nomination.

==== Candidates ====
- Wilber M. Brucker, Attorney General of Michigan
- Alex J. Groesbeck, former governor
- Edward J. Jeffries, judge from Detroit

==== Results ====
Republican primary results
Party	Candidate	Votes	%
Republican	Wilber M. Brucker	368,518	44.18%
Republican	Alex J. Groesbeck	364,357	43.69%
Republican	Edward J. Jeffries	101,168	12.13%
Total votes		834,043	100.00%

=== Democratic party ===
William Comstock was unopposed for the Democratic nomination for the third consecutive election.

==== Candidates ====
- William Comstock, Democratic nominee for governor in 1926 and 1928

==== Results ====
Democratic primary results
Party	Candidate	Votes	%
Democratic	William Comstock	18,822	100.00%
Total votes		18,822	100.00%

=== Minor parties ===
Socialist primary results
Party	Candidate	Votes	%
Socialist	George M. Campbell	45	100.00%
Total votes		45	100.00%

Workers primary results
Party	Candidate	Votes	%
Workers	Joseph Billups	94	100.00%
Total votes		94	100.00%

Prohibition primary results
Party	Candidate	Votes	%
Prohibition	Duly McCone	10	100.00%
Total votes		10	100.00%

== General election ==
=== Candidates ===
Major party candidates

- Wilber M. Brucker, Republican
- William Comstock, Democratic

Other candidates

- Joseph Billups, Workers
- George M. Campbell, Socialist
- Duly McCone, Prohibition

=== Results ===
1930 Michigan gubernatorial election
Party	Candidate	Votes	%	±%
Republican	Wilber M. Brucker	483,990	56.88%	−13.06%
Democratic	William Comstock	357,664	42.03%	+12.60%
Workers	Joseph Billups	3,988	0.47%	+0.28%
Socialist	George M. Campbell	3,903	0.46%	+0.25%
Prohibition	Duly McCone	1,336	0.16%	−0.03%
	Scattering	11	0.00%	
Majority		126,326	14.85%	
Total votes		850,892	100.00%	
Republican hold		Swing	-25.66%	

==== Results by county ====
After this election, Alger County would not vote Republican again until 1966. Delta County and Dickinson County would also not vote Republican again until 1964.

County	Wilber M. Brucker Republican		William Comstock Democratic		Joseph Billups Workers		George M. Campbell Socialist		Duly McCone Prohibition		Margin		Total votes cast
County	#	%	#	%	#	%	#	%	#	%	#	%	Total votes cast
Alcona	676	68.98%	297	30.31%	1	0.10%	4	0.41%	2	0.20%	379	38.67%	980
Alger	1,544	69.64%	580	26.16%	72	3.25%	16	0.72%	5	0.23%	964	43.48%	2,217
Allegan	4,647	72.15%	1,761	27.34%	2	0.03%	17	0.26%	14	0.22%	2,886	44.81%	6,441
Alpena	2,572	51.28%	2,437	48.58%	0	0.00%	6	0.12%	1	0.02%	135	2.69%	5,016
Antrim	1,647	78.43%	431	20.52%	3	0.14%	10	0.48%	9	0.43%	1,216	57.90%	2,100
Arenac	1,218	67.22%	584	32.23%	1	0.06%	5	0.28%	4	0.22%	634	34.99%	1,812
Baraga	2,537	85.11%	377	12.65%	59	1.98%	5	0.17%	3	0.10%	2,160	72.46%	2,981
Barry	4,169	67.47%	1,970	31.88%	1	0.02%	11	0.18%	28	0.45%	2,199	35.59%	6,179
Bay	6,616	52.44%	5,917	46.90%	7	0.06%	49	0.39%	28	0.22%	699	5.54%	12,617
Benzie	1,632	84.17%	289	14.90%	2	0.10%	12	0.62%	4	0.21%	1,343	69.26%	1,939
Berrien	11,118	55.53%	8,822	44.06%	9	0.04%	50	0.25%	24	0.12%	2,296	11.47%	20,023
Branch	3,703	65.45%	1,933	34.16%	0	0.00%	10	0.18%	12	0.21%	1,770	31.28%	5,658
Calhoun	10,295	64.99%	5,387	34.01%	12	0.08%	99	0.62%	48	0.30%	4,908	30.98%	15,841
Cass	3,730	57.20%	2,743	42.06%	9	0.14%	28	0.43%	11	0.17%	987	15.14%	6,521
Charlevoix	2,001	79.56%	491	19.52%	3	0.12%	14	0.56%	6	0.24%	1,510	60.04%	2,515
Cheboygan	2,401	64.80%	1,280	34.55%	2	0.05%	12	0.32%	10	0.27%	1,121	30.26%	3,705
Chippewa	2,851	67.40%	1,316	31.11%	40	0.95%	15	0.35%	8	0.19%	1,535	36.29%	4,230
Clare	1,428	66.57%	715	33.33%	0	0.00%	1	0.05%	1	0.05%	713	33.24%	2,145
Clinton	3,759	62.60%	2,230	37.14%	3	0.05%	4	0.07%	9	0.15%	1,529	25.46%	6,005
Crawford	639	63.39%	364	36.11%	0	0.00%	4	0.40%	1	0.10%	275	27.28%	1,008
Delta	5,113	76.14%	1,535	22.86%	39	0.58%	26	0.39%	2	0.03%	3,578	53.28%	6,715
Dickinson	5,378	85.34%	872	13.84%	14	0.22%	34	0.54%	4	0.06%	4,506	71.50%	6,302
Eaton	4,640	55.35%	3,709	44.24%	3	0.04%	21	0.25%	10	0.12%	931	11.11%	8,383
Emmet	3,119	79.69%	762	19.47%	3	0.08%	23	0.59%	7	0.18%	2,357	60.22%	3,914
Genesee	14,138	52.39%	12,624	46.78%	35	0.13%	129	0.48%	58	0.21%	1,514	5.61%	26,984
Gladwin	1,109	70.06%	466	29.44%	0	0.00%	7	0.44%	1	0.06%	643	40.62%	1,583
Gogebic	5,614	87.24%	646	10.04%	131	2.04%	20	0.31%	23	0.36%	4,968	77.20%	6,435 (Note: Includes 1 Scattering vote)
Grand Traverse	3,150	72.12%	1,197	27.40%	6	0.14%	7	0.16%	8	0.18%	1,953	44.71%	4,368
Gratiot	4,804	63.02%	2,791	36.61%	4	0.05%	10	0.13%	14	0.18%	2,013	26.41%	7,623
Hillsdale	4,720	67.54%	2,241	32.07%	0	0.00%	1	0.01%	26	0.37%	2,479	35.48%	6,988
Houghton	8,027	79.12%	1,993	19.65%	79	0.78%	25	0.25%	21	0.21%	6,034	59.48%	10,145
Huron	5,365	66.34%	2,721	33.65%	1	0.01%	0	0.00%	0	0.00%	2,644	32.69%	8,087
Ingham	13,871	56.54%	10,485	42.73%	11	0.04%	112	0.46%	56	0.23%	3,386	13.80%	24,535
Ionia	5,489	54.61%	4,518	44.95%	1	0.01%	25	0.25%	18	0.18%	971	9.66%	10,051
Iosco	1,047	63.65%	585	35.56%	2	0.12%	6	0.36%	4	0.24%	462	28.09%	1,645
Iron	5,367	91.51%	421	7.18%	48	0.82%	23	0.39%	6	0.10%	4,946	84.33%	5,865
Isabella	3,085	70.61%	1,260	28.84%	2	0.05%	5	0.11%	17	0.39%	1,825	41.77%	4,369
Jackson	9,949	55.69%	7,847	43.92%	4	0.02%	12	0.07%	53	0.30%	2,102	11.77%	17,865
Kalamazoo	11,178	67.80%	5,205	31.57%	12	0.07%	66	0.40%	24	0.15%	5,973	36.23%	16,486
Kalkaska	755	75.88%	224	22.51%	1	0.10%	11	1.11%	4	0.40%	531	53.37%	995
Kent	18,428	54.60%	15,000	44.45%	103	0.31%	152	0.45%	65	0.19%	3,428	10.16%	33,748
Keweenaw	1,502	94.17%	76	4.76%	14	0.88%	2	0.13%	1	0.06%	1,426	89.40%	1,595
Lake	1,094	69.15%	481	30.40%	1	0.06%	4	0.25%	2	0.13%	613	38.75%	1,582
Lapeer	4,020	69.74%	1,708	29.63%	4	0.07%	18	0.31%	12	0.21%	2,312	40.11%	5,764 (Note: Includes 2 Scattering votes)
Leelanau	1,724	85.22%	281	13.89%	5	0.25%	5	0.25%	8	0.40%	1,443	71.33%	2,023
Lenawee	8,536	58.55%	5,981	41.02%	6	0.04%	42	0.29%	15	0.10%	2,555	17.52%	14,580
Livingston	3,563	53.00%	3,131	46.57%	6	0.09%	2	0.03%	21	0.31%	432	6.43%	6,723
Luce	700	73.30%	242	25.34%	4	0.42%	7	0.73%	2	0.21%	458	47.96%	955
Mackinac	1,495	55.13%	1,201	44.28%	2	0.07%	11	0.41%	3	0.11%	294	10.84%	2,712
Macomb	8,818	49.31%	8,909	49.82%	84	0.47%	53	0.30%	16	0.09%	-91	-0.51%	17,881
Manistee	3,070	59.16%	2,079	40.07%	24	0.46%	10	0.19%	6	0.12%	991	19.10%	5,189
Marquette	4,783	75.36%	1,415	22.29%	84	1.32%	42	0.66%	23	0.36%	3,368	53.06%	6,347
Mason	1,632	53.63%	1,374	45.15%	12	0.39%	14	0.46%	11	0.36%	258	8.48%	3,043
Mecosta	2,883	76.94%	831	22.18%	5	0.13%	14	0.37%	14	0.37%	2,052	54.76%	3,747
Menominee	4,487	63.21%	2,556	36.01%	21	0.30%	26	0.37%	9	0.13%	1,931	27.20%	7,099
Midland	2,265	68.84%	1,009	30.67%	0	0.00%	5	0.15%	11	0.33%	1,256	38.18%	3,290
Missaukee	1,163	73.94%	400	25.43%	3	0.19%	2	0.13%	5	0.32%	763	48.51%	1,573
Monroe	5,670	41.65%	7,905	58.07%	12	0.09%	17	0.12%	9	0.07%	-2,235	-16.42%	13,613
Montcalm	4,198	66.60%	2,094	33.22%	0	0.00%	5	0.08%	6	0.10%	2,104	33.38%	6,303
Montmorency	468	50.49%	455	49.08%	0	0.00%	0	0.00%	4	0.43%	13	1.40%	927
Muskegon	8,956	63.69%	4,990	35.49%	37	0.26%	60	0.43%	18	0.13%	3,966	28.21%	14,061
Newaygo	2,485	75.33%	791	23.98%	2	0.06%	11	0.33%	10	0.30%	1,694	51.35%	3,299
Oakland	15,999	49.74%	15,901	49.44%	58	0.18%	157	0.49%	49	0.15%	98	0.30%	32,164
Oceana	1,984	72.22%	735	26.76%	5	0.18%	3	0.11%	19	0.69%	1,249	45.47%	2,747
Ogemaw	1,627	75.32%	522	24.17%	3	0.14%	3	0.14%	5	0.23%	1,105	51.16%	2,160
Ontonagon	2,878	74.54%	802	20.77%	168	4.35%	8	0.21%	5	0.13%	2,076	53.77%	3,861
Osceola	3,075	77.26%	901	22.64%	0	0.00%	1	0.03%	3	0.08%	2,174	54.62%	3,980
Oscoda	506	89.08%	61	10.74%	0	0.00%	0	0.00%	1	0.18%	445	78.35%	568
Otsego	1,180	75.26%	384	24.49%	0	0.00%	1	0.06%	2	0.13%	796	50.77%	1,568
Ottawa	6,759	64.24%	3,698	35.15%	8	0.08%	46	0.44%	10	0.10%	3,061	29.09%	10,521
Presque Isle	699	55.08%	560	44.13%	3	0.24%	6	0.47%	1	0.08%	139	10.95%	1,269
Roscommon	934	74.66%	309	24.70%	1	0.08%	4	0.32%	3	0.24%	625	49.96%	1,251
Saginaw	11,734	52.03%	10,680	47.36%	13	0.06%	107	0.47%	18	0.08%	1,054	4.67%	22,552
Sanilac	5,207	76.88%	1,537	22.69%	2	0.03%	17	0.25%	9	0.13%	3,670	54.19%	6,773
Schoolcraft	1,493	80.88%	333	18.04%	2	0.11%	13	0.70%	5	0.27%	1,160	62.84%	1,846
Shiawassee	4,984	64.32%	2,685	34.65%	1	0.01%	55	0.71%	24	0.31%	2,299	29.67%	7,749
St. Clair	9,956	61.85%	6,078	37.76%	2	0.01%	16	0.10%	46	0.29%	3,878	24.09%	16,098
St. Joseph	4,695	62.68%	2,766	36.93%	1	0.01%	15	0.20%	13	0.17%	1,929	25.75%	7,490
Tuscola	4,324	72.26%	1,630	27.24%	4	0.07%	13	0.22%	13	0.22%	2,694	45.02%	5,984
Van Buren	5,503	68.15%	2,516	31.16%	7	0.09%	37	0.46%	12	0.15%	2,987	36.99%	8,075
Washtenaw	8,432	53.74%	7,250	46.21%	6	0.04%	0	0.00%	0	0.00%	1,182	7.53%	15,690
Wayne	112,425	45.10%	132,039	52.96%	2,651	1.06%	1,956	0.78%	231	0.09%	-19,614	-7.87%	249,302
Wexford	2,555	65.20%	1,342	34.24%	2	0.05%	8	0.20%	12	0.31%	1,213	30.95%	3,919
Total	483,990	56.88%	357,664	42.03%	3,988	0.47%	3,903	0.46%	1,336	0.16%	126,326	14.85%	850,892

===== Counties that flipped from Republican to Democratic =====
- Macomb
- Monroe
- Wayne
