= 1928 United States elections =

- ← 1926 1927 1928 1929 1930 → Presidential election year
- Election day: November 6
- Incumbent president: ▌Calvin Coolidge (R)
- Next Congress: 71st

Presidential election
- Partisan control: Republican hold
- Popular vote margin: Republican +17.4%
- Electoral vote
- Herbert Hoover (R): 444
- Al Smith (D): 87
- 1928 presidential election results. Red denotes states won by Hoover, blue denotes states won by Smith. Numbers indicate the electoral votes won by each candidate.

Senate elections
- Overall control: Republican hold
- Seats contested: 35 of 96 seats (32 Class 1 seats + 5 special elections)
- Net seat change: Republican +8
- 1928 Senate election results Democratic gain Democratic hold Republican gain Republican hold Farmer-Labor hold

House elections
- Overall control: Republican hold
- Seats contested: All 435 voting members
- Net seat change: Republican +32
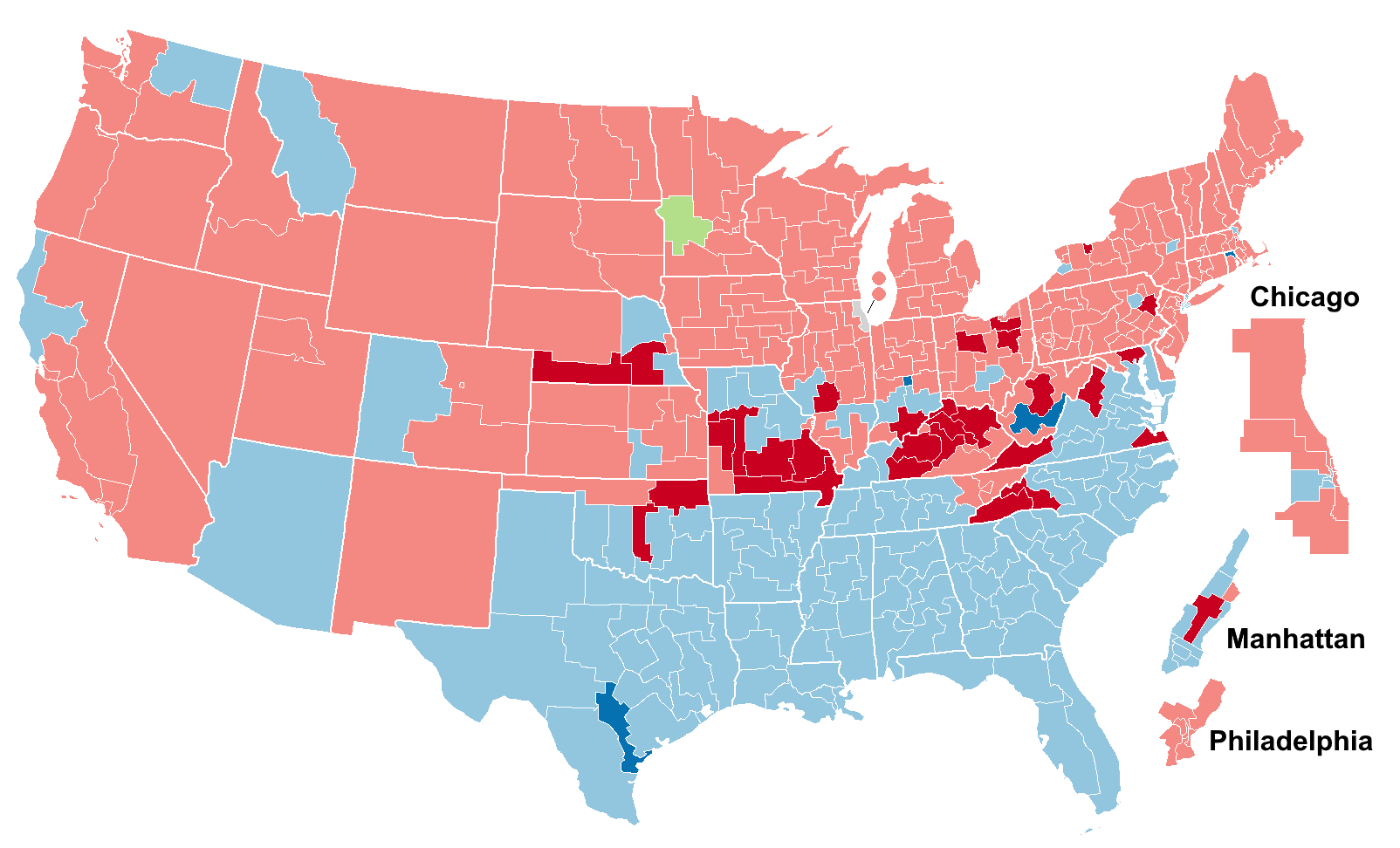
- 1928 House of Representatives results

Gubernatorial elections
- Seats contested: 35
- Net seat change: Republican +3
- 1928 gubernatorial election results Democratic hold Republican gain Republican hold

Elections took place on November 6, 1928. In the last election before the start of the Great Depression, the Republican Party retained control of the presidency and bolstered their majority in both chambers of Congress.

Republican former Secretary of Commerce Herbert Hoover defeated Democratic nominee New York Governor Al Smith. Hoover won a landslide victory, taking several Southern states and winning almost every state outside the South. The Democrats suffered from voter prejudice against Roman Catholics, like Smith. As incumbent President Calvin Coolidge declined to seek re-election, Hoover won the Republican nomination on the first ballot. Like Hoover, Smith also won his party's nomination on the first ballot.

The Republicans gained thirty-two seats in the House of Representatives, furthering a majority over the Democrats. The Republicans also increased a majority in the Senate, gaining eight seats.

== See also ==
- 1928 United States presidential election
- 1928 United States House of Representatives elections
- 1928 United States Senate elections
- 1928 United States gubernatorial elections
