= William Comstock =

American politician

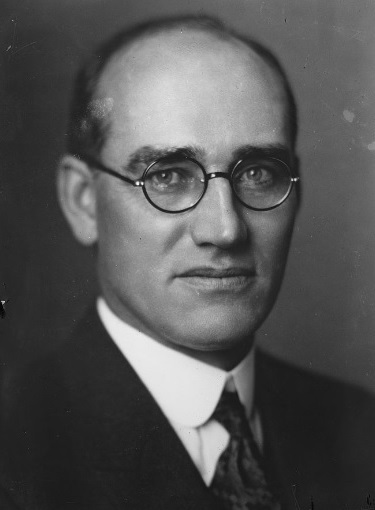

33rd Governor of Michigan
- In office January 1, 1933 – January 1, 1935
- Lieutenant: Allen E. Stebbins
- Preceded by: Wilber M. Brucker
- Succeeded by: Frank Fitzgerald

Personal details
- Born: July 2, 1877 Alpena, Michigan, U.S.
- Died: June 16, 1949 (aged 71) Alpena, Michigan, U.S.
- Party: Democratic
- Spouse: Josephine White Morrison
- Children: 2
- Education: University of Michigan

William Alfred Comstock (July 2, 1877 – June 16, 1949) was an American politician who served as the 33rd governor of Michigan. During his tenure, he advocated a number of progressive measures such as minimum wages and old age pensions.

== Early life ==
Born in 1877 in Alpena, Michigan, he attended the University of Michigan, where he was admitted to the Zeta Psi fraternity, graduating in 1899. Within the Zeta Psi Fraternity, "The Vision of Bill Comstock" is known as his desire to unite all the chapters through the publication of a newsletter known as The Circle, which he first published in 1909. He established a successful career in real estate, banking and railroad construction.

== Politics ==
In 1911, Comstock entered politics by serving as the Democratic county chairman. He served as alderman of Alpena from 1911 to 1912 and served as its mayor from 1913 to 1914. He was a member of the University of Michigan board of regents, from 1914 to 1916. He was a member of Michigan Democratic State Central Committee in 1915 and served as its chairman from 1920 to 1924. Then he served as a member of Democratic National Committee from Michigan, 1924–30. He served as a delegate to Democratic National Convention from Michigan 1924 which nominated John W. Davis for U.S. President, again in 1928 to nominate Al Smith, and lastly in 1932 to nominate Franklin D. Roosevelt, the only successful candidate of the three. Comstock was an unsuccessful candidate for Governor of Michigan in 1926 and 1928 against Fred W. Green, and unsuccessful as well in 1930 against Wilber Marion Brucker.

In 1932, Comstock defeated Brucker and served as governor from 1933 to 1935. During his tenure, the state's first sales tax law was authorized, an old age pension system was initiated, but later failed; a trust commission was established; and an eight-day bank holiday was affirmed, which later led to President Roosevelt's announcement of a national holiday. He also pardoned Rudolph G. Tenerowicz the former mayor of Hamtramck, who had been imprisoned for bribery with twelve others in 1932. Tenerowicz was later elected to U.S. Congress.

== Retirement and death ==
Comstock later served as a member of the Michigan Civil Service Commission from 1939 to 1940, and as a member of the Detroit City Council from 1942 to 1949. He was a member of the Freemasons, Elks, Eagles, and Zeta Psi. He died from a stroke in Alpena, Michigan on June 16, 1949, and is interred there at Evergreen Cemetery.

== Sourcing ==
- Herman, Caryn (2008). Herman, Jennifer L.; Hannan, Caryn (eds.). Michigan Biographical Dictionary. Hamburg, MI: Native Amer Books. ISBN 978-1-878592-95-8.
- Publishers, Somerset (1999). The Encyclopedia of Michigan 1999. St. Clair Shores, Mich.: Somerset Publishers. ISBN 978-0-403-09322-9.
- Blenz, Beth (1989). Encyclopedia of Michigan. New York: Somerset Publishers. ISBN 978-0-403-09973-3.
- Hagman, Arthur A (1970). Oakland County Book of History. University of Michigan.

Party political offices
Preceded by Edward Frensdorf	Democratic nominee for Governor of Michigan; 1926, 1928, 1930, 1932	Succeeded by Arthur J. Lacy
Political offices
Preceded by Wilber M. Brucker	Governor of Michigan; 1933–1935	Succeeded by Frank Fitzgerald
