= Paul W. Voorhies =

American lawyer

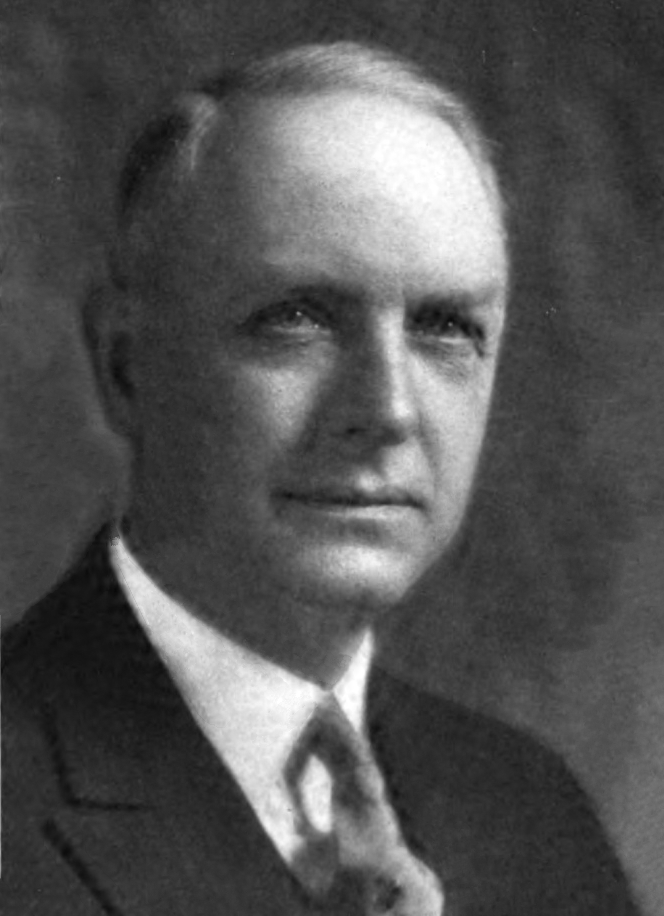
Paul W. Voorhies c. 1933

Paul Warren Voorhies (December 17, 1875 – January 8, 1952) was a Michigan lawyer who served as Wayne County Prosecutor and Michigan Attorney General.

== Biography ==
Voorhies was born in Plymouth, Michigan on December 17, 1875. He graduated from the University of Michigan in 1898 with a Bachelor of Letters degree and the University of Michigan Law School with a Bachelor of Laws in 1900. He was admitted to the bar and practiced briefly in Erie County, New York before returning to Michigan and establishing himself as an attorney in Detroit. In the 1910s Voorhies served in the Wayne County Prosecutor's office and advanced to Chief Deputy.

A Republican, Voorhies won election as Wayne County Prosecutor in 1920 and 1922, serving from 1921 to 1925.

In the late 1920s he was a Special Assistant Attorney General, working under Attorney General Wilber M. Brucker. In 1930 Voorhies was the successful Republican nominee for Attorney General of Michigan, succeeding Brucker, and served from 1931 to 1933.

Voorhies returned temporarily to the Wayne County Prosecutor's office in 1940, appointed after the incumbent had been removed on corruption charges.

He died in Detroit on January 8, 1952, and was buried in Plymouth's Riverside Cemetery.

Legal offices
Preceded by Wilber M. Brucker	Michigan Attorney General; 1931–1933	Succeeded by Patrick H. O'Brien
