= George W. Welsh =

American politician

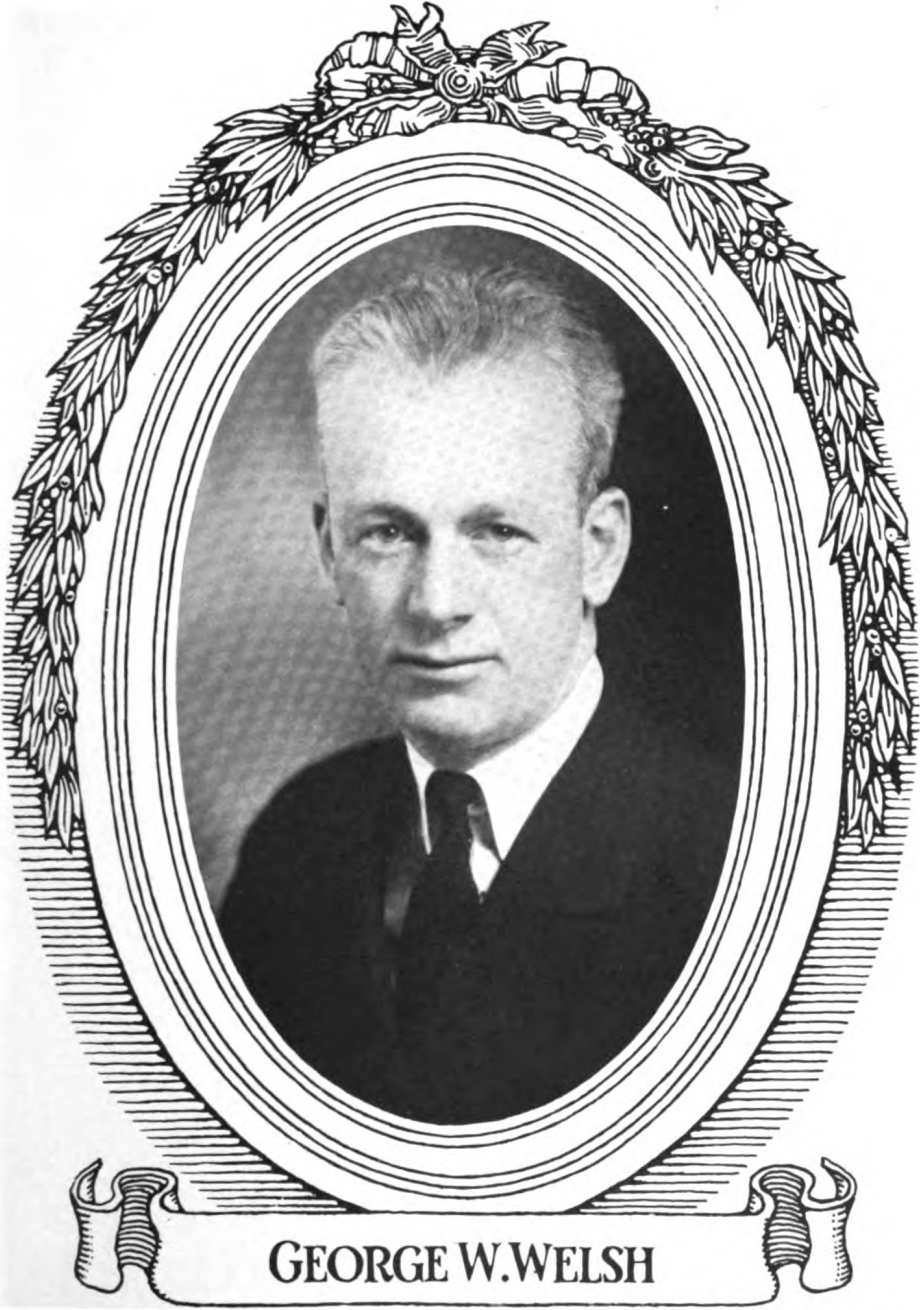

46th Speaker of the Michigan House of Representatives
- In office January 3, 1923 – December 31, 1924
- Governor: Alex J. Groesbeck
- Preceded by: Fred L. Warner
- Succeeded by: Fred B. Wells

Member of the Michigan House of Representatives from the 1st Kent County district
- In office January 1, 1917 – December 31, 1924

37th Lieutenant Governor of Michigan
- In office January 1, 1925 – December 31, 1926
- Governor: Alex J. Groesbeck
- Preceded by: Thomas Read
- Succeeded by: Luren Dickinson

Mayor of Grand Rapids, Michigan
- In office April 4, 1938 – 1949
- Preceded by: Tunis Johnson
- Succeeded by: Stanley J. Davis

7th President of the United States Conference of Mayors
- In office 1947–1949
- Preceded by: Edward Joseph Kelly
- Succeeded by: Cooper Green

Personal details
- Born: George Wilson Welsh; March 27, 1883 Glasgow, Scotland
- Died: June 29, 1974 (aged 91) Ada, Michigan
- Resting place: Oak Hill Cemetery, Grand Rapids, Michigan
- Party: Republican
- Spouse: Shirlie

George W. Welsh was a Republican politician from Michigan who served as the 37th lieutenant governor of Michigan, in the Michigan House of Representatives including as its Speaker during the 52nd Legislature, and as the mayor of Grand Rapids, Michigan.

Born in Glasgow, Scotland on March 27, 1883, to Joseph and Elizabeth Welsh, George Welsh operated a printing business and was the publisher of the farm magazine "The Fruit Belt."

Welsh's political career began in 1917 when he was elected to the State House representing Kent County, where he served until 1924 and as Speaker in his final two years. Alex J. Groesbeck selected Welsh to be his running mate for his successful campaign for Governor of Michigan in 1924. Welsh attended the Republican National Convention in Cleveland that year which nominated Calvin Coolidge for President of the United States.

He was a candidate in the primary for governor in both 1928, losing to Fred W. Green, and 1932, losing to Wilber M. Brucker.

Welsh was elected mayor of Grand Rapids in 1938, serving for just over a decade.

Welsh served as president of the United States Conference of Mayors from 1947 until 1949.

Welsh served as the city manager of Grand Rapids. During his tenure as city manager, he masterminded the construction of the pool at Richmond Park. He also developed a plan during the Great Depression whereby the city would provide jobs for needy residents, paying them in scrip-type money which could be redeemed for food, clothing, and other necessities at stores in the city. His plan preceded Franklin D. Roosevelt's New Deal and came to an end when federal programs became available.

Political offices
Preceded by Thomas Read	Lieutenant Governor of Michigan; 1925–1927	Succeeded by Luren D. Dickinson
