= Fred L. Warner =

American politician

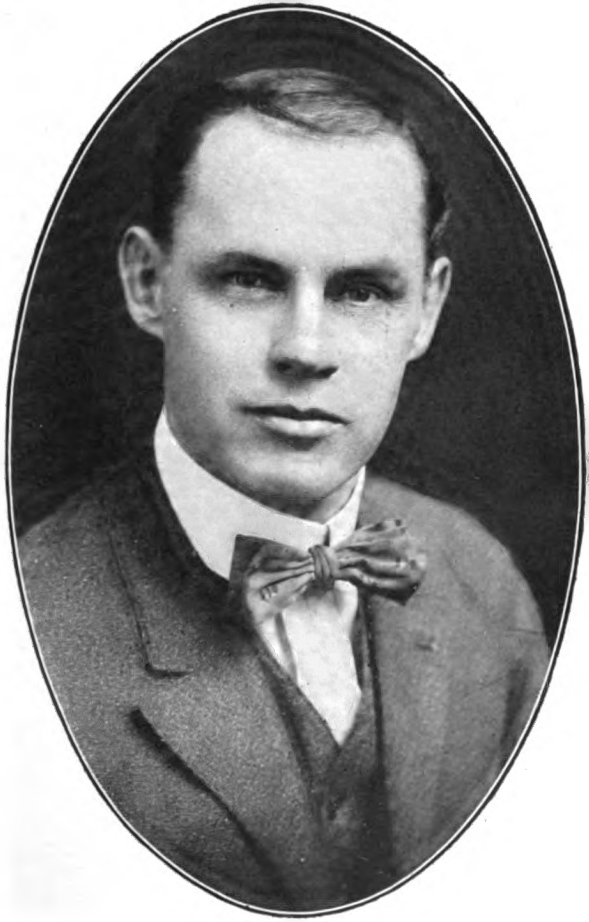

45th Speaker of the Michigan House of Representatives
- In office January 5, 1921 – October 20, 1922
- Preceded by: Thomas Read
- Succeeded by: George W. Welsh

Member of the Michigan House of Representatives from the Ionia County district
- In office 1915–1922
- Preceded by: Willis F. Bricker
- Succeeded by: Nelson M. O'Beirne

Personal details
- Born: September 16, 1877 Penn Yan, New York
- Died: July 17, 1942 (aged 64) Lansing, Michigan
- Party: Republican
- Education: University of Michigan
- Profession: Lawyer

Fred L. Warner (1877-1942) was a Republican politician who served in the Michigan House of Representatives for Ionia County from 1915–1922. He served as Speaker of the House during the 51st Legislature.

Born in Penn Yan, New York in 1877, Warner moved to Michigan and graduated with a law degree from the University of Michigan in 1907. He then went into private practice in Belding, later being appointed the city attorney. Warner was elected to the House in 1914 and served four terms, his last was as Speaker. He was defeated in the primary election in 1922. He died in Lansing, Michigan in 1942.
