= Guy H. Lockwood =

American cartoonist and political activist

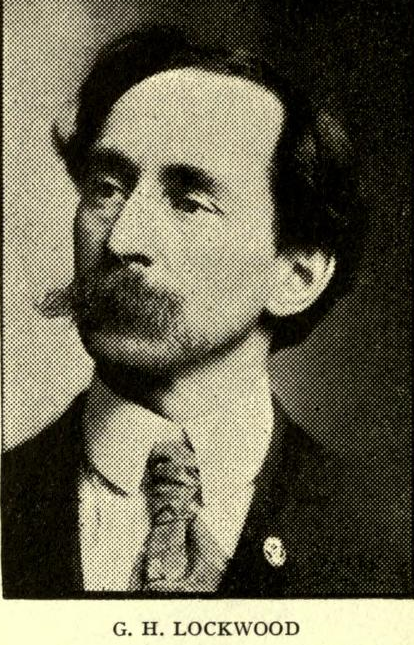
- Lockwood in a 1912 publication
- Born: June 26, 1870; Minneapolis
- Died: September 28, 1947 (aged 77); Kalamazoo, Michigan
- Occupations: Cartoonist, political activist

Guy H. Lockwood (June 26, 1870 – September 28, 1947) was an American cartoonist and political activist. Lockwood is best remembered as a touring socialist enthusiast who illustrated and published about a dozen propaganda pamphlets during the first fifteen years of the 20th century.

== Biography ==
=== Early years ===
Guy H. Lockwood was born on June 26, 1870, in Minneapolis.

=== Socialist propagandist ===
Propaganda wagon decorated by Guy Lockwood for a 2,000 mile trip from Tennessee to Chicago to attend the 1st Convention of the Social Democracy of America.

In 1898 Lockwood attracted regional attention when he led a party of four delegates to the First National Convention of the Social Democracy of America in a painted propaganda wagon — a journey of 2,000 miles from Tennessee to Chicago, the site of the convention. During the journey Lockwood and his political associates stopped in towns along their route to lecture about socialism from the back of their wagon, with Lockwood selling pen-and-ink caricatures and greeting cards to raise funds for the journey.

The brightly decorated wagon was painted by Lockwood and he produced a series of cartoon placards to help illustrate the political oratory delivered by himself and A. S. Edwards, editor of the socialist weekly newspaper The Coming Nation, who was also a convention delegate.

Lockwood saw the propaganda wagon as an important innovation — one which he would use with regularity over the next two decades — declaring to the press that

"We are socialists and we want to spread the doctrine of cooperation rather than competition. We think we have found the way to convert the country, because we can travel cheaply in a wagon and reach all classes."

Lockwood and his associates were advocates of the Social Democracy establishing a "wagon brigade" of similar propaganda vehicles to bring the new political party's message to small communities across the United States.

=== Later years ===
Cover art of Guy Lockwood's pamphlet, Unity.

Lockwood was a vegetarian. In 1912, he authored How to Live 100 Years. Lockwood argued against the use of tobacco as it used up the body's energy necessary for attaining longevity.

In 1928, Lockwood stood for election heading the Socialist Party's Michigan ticket as its candidate for Governor.

Lockwood would remain politically active in Socialist Party politics into his 60s, gaining election state organizer of the Socialist Party of Michigan in 1934, in which capacity he took part in socialist lectures around the state.

=== Death and legacy ===
Guy Lockwood died at his home in Kalamazoo, Michigan, on September 28, 1947.

Lockwood's papers are housed at the Zhang Legacy Collections Center of Western Michigan University, located in his longtime hometown of Kalamazoo.

== Works ==
- Pa and Young America: Short Stories with Sharp Strings. Kalamazoo, MI: Lockwood Publishing Co., n.d. [c. 1912].
- The Sign of the Billy Goat. Kalamazoo, MI: Lockwood Publishing Co., n.d. [c. 1913].
- The Priest and the Billy Goat. Kalamazoo, MI: Lockwood Publishing Co., n.d. [c. 1913].
- The Soldier and the Billy Goat. Kalamazoo, MI: Lockwood Publishing Co., n.d. [c. 1913].
- Lockwood Art Course. Kalamazoo, MI: Lockwood Art School, n.d. [c. 1916].
- Lockwood and His Punch and Judy Show. Kalamazoo, MI: Lockwood Publishing Co., n.d. [c. 1910s].
- How to Live 100 Years. Kalamazoo, MI: Lockwood Publishing Co., n.d. [c. 1910s].
- Unity. Kalamazoo, MI: Lockwood Publishing Co., n.d. [c. 1910s].
- Mastership or Mediumship — Which? A Timely Warning: A New View on the Subject of Communicating with the Dead. Kalamazoo, MI: The Invisible Brotherhood (Lockwood Publishing Co.), n.d. [c. 1920].
- The Story of the Giants and Their Tools. Kalamazoo, MI: Lockwood Publishing Co., n.d. [c. 1922].
- Mrs. Lockwood's Book of Favorite Recitations. With Hazel L. Lockwood. Kalamazoo, MI: Lockwood Publishing Co., 1922.
- The Story. Kalamazoo, MI: G. Lockwood, 1928.
- Periodical: The Prophet and the Ass. (1911-1912).

Party political offices
Preceded by William L. Krieghoff (in 1924)	Socialist nominee for Governor of Michigan; 1928	Succeeded by George M. Campbell
