= 1928 Michigan gubernatorial election =

- November 6, 1928
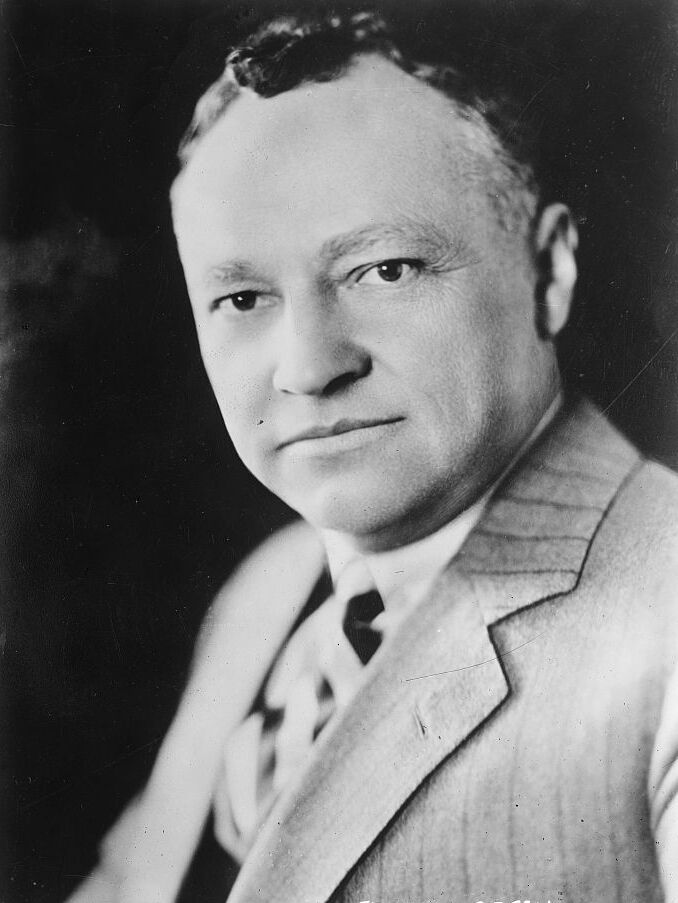

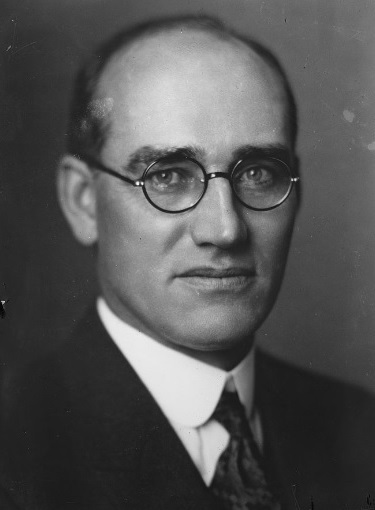
Nominee	Fred W. Green	William Comstock
Party	Republican	Democratic
Popular vote	961,179	404,546
Percentage	69.94%	29.44%
- County results Green: 50–60% 60–70% 70–80% 80–90% >90%
Governor before election
Fred W. Green
Republican
Elected Governor
Fred W. Green
Republican

The 1928 Michigan gubernatorial election was held on November 6, 1928. In a rematch of the previous election, incumbent Republican Fred W. Green defeated Democratic nominee William Comstock in a landslide with 69.94% of the vote.

== Primary election ==
Michigan held primary elections on September 4, 1928.

=== Republican party ===
Incumbent governor Fred W. Green easily won renomination for a second term.

==== Candidates ====
- Fred W. Green, incumbent governor
- George W. Welsh, former Lieutenant Governor of Michigan
- Robert R. Pointer

==== Results ====
Republican primary results
Party	Candidate	Votes	%
Republican	Fred W. Green (inc.)	421,505	67.79%
Republican	George W. Welsh	199,386	32.07%
Republican	Robert R. Pointer	897	0.14%
Total votes		621,788	100.00%

=== Democratic party ===
William Comstock was unopposed for the Democratic nomination for the second consecutive election.

==== Candidates ====
- William Comstock, Democratic nominee for governor in 1926

==== Results ====
Democratic primary results
Party	Candidate	Votes	%
Democratic	William Comstock	47,259	100.00%
Total votes		47,259	100.00%

=== Minor parties ===
Prohibition primary results
Party	Candidate	Votes	%
Prohibition	Ervin D. Brooks	76	100.00%
Total votes		76	100.00%

Socialist primary results
Party	Candidate	Votes	%
Socialist	Guy H. Lockwood	272	100.00%
Total votes		272	100.00%

Workers primary results
Party	Candidate	Votes	%
Workers	William Reynolds	168	100.00%
Total votes		168	100.00%

Socialist Labor primary results
Party	Candidate	Votes	%
Socialist Labor	Paul Dinger	56	100.00%
Total votes		56	100.00%

== General election ==
=== Candidates ===
Major party candidates

- Fred W. Green, Republican
- William Comstock, Democratic

Other candidates

- Guy H. Lockwood, Socialist
- Ervin D. Brooks, Prohibition
- William Reynolds, Workers
- Paul Dinger, Socialist Labor

=== Results ===
1928 Michigan gubernatorial election
Party	Candidate	Votes	%	±%
Republican	Fred W. Green (inc.)	961,179	69.94%	+6.59%
Democratic	William Comstock	404,546	29.44%	−6.58%
Socialist	Guy H. Lockwood	2,850	0.21%	
Prohibition	Ervin D. Brooks	2,575	0.19%	−0.21%
Workers	William Reynolds	2,537	0.18%	−0.06%
Socialist Labor	Paul Dinger	654	0.05%	
Majority		556,633	40.50%	
Total votes		1,374,341	100.00%	
Republican hold		Swing	+13.17%	

==== Results by county ====
Wayne County has voted Republican only twice since this election. (Note: In 1946 and 1978.)

County	Fred W. Green Republican		William Comstock Democratic		Guy H. Lockwood Socialist		Ervin D. Brooks Prohibition		William Reynolds Workers		Paul Dinger Socialist Labor		Margin		Total votes cast
County	#	%	#	%	#	%	#	%	#	%	#	%	#	%	Total votes cast
Alcona	1,088	74.93%	357	24.59%	3	0.21%	4	0.28%	0	0.00%	0	0.00%	731	50.34%	1,452
Alger	1,908	65.10%	890	30.37%	19	0.65%	6	0.20%	105	3.58%	3	0.10%	1,018	34.73%	2,931
Allegan	11,013	82.35%	2,310	17.27%	19	0.14%	26	0.19%	2	0.01%	3	0.02%	8,703	65.08%	13,373
Alpena	3,202	57.91%	2,314	41.85%	6	0.11%	6	0.11%	0	0.00%	1	0.02%	888	16.06%	5,529
Antrim	2,803	85.20%	467	14.19%	10	0.30%	9	0.27%	1	0.03%	0	0.00%	2,336	71.00%	3,290
Arenac	1,519	64.15%	839	35.43%	5	0.21%	2	0.08%	2	0.08%	1	0.04%	680	28.72%	2,368
Baraga	2,303	68.08%	956	28.26%	3	0.09%	3	0.09%	118	3.49%	0	0.00%	1,347	39.82%	3,383
Barry	6,067	79.93%	1,498	19.74%	5	0.07%	20	0.26%	0	0.00%	5	0.23%	1,630	74.02%	2,202
Bay	12,455	56.70%	9,445	43.00%	17	0.08%	38	0.17%	5	0.02%	5	0.02%	3,010	13.70%	21,965
Benzie	1,905	86.51%	275	12.49%	15	0.68%	2	0.09%	0	0.00%	5	0.23%	1,630	74.02%	2,202
Berrien	19,650	70.12%	8,231	29.37%	54	0.19%	66	0.24%	1	0.01%	2	0.02%	4,069	44.15%	9,217
Branch	6,624	71.87%	2,555	27.72%	13	0.14%	22	0.24%	1	0.01%	2	0.02%	4,069	44.15%	9,217
Calhoun	24,177	79.16%	6,210	20.33%	58	0.19%	69	0.23%	14	0.05%	15	0.05%	17,967	58.83%	30,543
Cass	5,825	70.86%	2,346	28.54%	23	0.28%	20	0.24%	3	0.04%	4	0.05%	3,479	42.32%	8,221
Charlevoix	3,546	81.63%	768	17.68%	22	0.51%	6	0.14%	1	0.02%	1	0.02%	1,164	25.35%	4,592
Cheboygan	2,871	62.52%	1,707	37.17%	4	0.09%	8	0.17%	1	0.02%	1	0.02%	1,164	25.35%	4,592
Chippewa	5,514	70.56%	2,266	29.00%	5	0.06%	9	0.12%	19	0.24%	2	0.03%	3,248	41.56%	7,815
Clare	1,721	73.33%	601	25.61%	7	0.30%	14	0.60%	3	0.13%	1	0.04%	1,120	47.72%	2,347
Clinton	6,517	78.45%	1,759	21.17%	6	0.07%	23	0.28%	0	0.00%	2	0.02%	4,758	57.28%	8,307
Crawford	683	66.83%	334	32.68%	1	0.10%	4	0.39%	0	0.00%	0	0.00%	349	34.15%	1,022
Delta	6,050	56.83%	4,540	42.65%	22	0.21%	10	0.09%	16	0.15%	8	0.08%	1,510	14.18%	10,646
Dickinson	6,392	59.92%	4,235	39.70%	24	0.22%	5	0.05%	6	0.06%	5	0.05%	2,157	20.22%	10,667
Eaton	8,397	76.38%	2,568	23.36%	8	0.07%	19	0.17%	2	0.02%	0	0.00%	5,829	53.02%	10,994
Emmet	3,760	77.32v	1,071	22.02%	16	0.33%	13	0.27%	0	0.00%	3	0.06%	2,689	55.30%	4,863
Genesee	41,422	77.28%	12,003	22.39%	57	0.11%	84	0.16%	18	0.03%	13	0.02%	29,419	54.89%	53,597
Gladwin	1,728	79.74%	431	19.89%	2	0.09%	6	0.28%	0	0.00%	0	0.00%	1,297	59.85%	2,167
Gogebic	6,554	70.01%	2,665	28.47%	13	0.14%	15	0.16%	110	1.17%	5	0.05%	3,889	41.54%	9,362
Grand Traverse	4,668	78.37%	1,264	21.22%	3	0.05%	19	0.32%	1	0.02%	1	0.02%	3,404	57.15%	5,956
Gratiot	8,762	80.20%	2,125	19.45%	9	0.08%	26	0.24%	3	0.03%	0	0.00%	6,637	60.75%	10,925
Hillsdale	8,073	78.23%	2,215	21.46%	2	0.02%	28	0.27%	2	0.02%	0	0.00%	5,858	56.76%	10,320
Houghton	11,843	65.58%	5,996	33.20%	18	0.10%	38	0.21%	153	0.85%	12	0.07%	5,847	32.38%	18,060
Huron	7,144	64.67%	3,868	35.02%	5	0.05%	26	0.24%	1	0.01%	2	0.02%	3,276	29.66%	11,046
Ingham	27,773	74.56%	9,296	24.96%	53	0.14%	99	0.27%	20	0.05%	7	0.02%	18,477	49.61%	37,248
Ionia	10,065	78.37%	2,714	21.13%	15	0.12%	45	0.35%	2	0.02%	2	0.02%	7,351	57.24%	12,843
Iosco	1,713	69.63%	732	29.76%	2	0.08%	10	0.41%	3	0.12%	0	0.00%	981	39.88%	2,460
Iron	4,315	66.86%	2,094	32.44%	7	0.11%	7	0.11%	26	0.40%	5	0.08%	2,221	34.41%	6,454
Isabella	4,984	73.01%	1,801	26.38%	7	0.10%	31	0.45%	3	0.04%	0	0.00%	3,183	46.63%	6,826
Jackson	23,952	74.07%	8,253	25.52%	31	0.10%	85	0.26%	9	0.03%	7	0.02%	15,699	48.55%	32,337
Kalamazoo	23,485	78.35%	6,234	20.80%	157	0.52%	79	0.26%	7	0.02%	12	0.04%	17,251	57.55%	29,974
Kalkaska	999	84.59%	165	13.97%	14	1.19%	3	0.25%	0	0.00%	0	0.00%	834	70.62%	1,181
Kent	56,688	75.38%	18,065	24.02%	133	0.18%	192	0.26%	108	0.14%	21	0.03%	38,623	51.36%	75,207
Keweenaw	1,353	80.01%	294	17.39%	0	0.00%	12	0.71%	30	1.77%	2	0.12%	1,059	62.63%	1,691
Lake	1,244	78.34%	339	21.35%	2	0.13%	3	0.19%	0	0.00%	0	0.00%	905	56.99%	1,588
Lapeer	6,317	80.23%	1,530	19.43%	7	0.09%	19	0.24%	0	0.00%	1	0.01%	4,787	60.80%	7,874
Leelanau	1,593	65.47%	831	34.16%	1	0.04%	8	0.33%	0	0.00%	0	0.00%	762	31.32%	2,433
Lenawee	14,513	75.32%	4,704	24.41%	3	0.02%	45	0.23%	2	0.01%	1	0.01%	9,809	50.91%	19,268
Livingston	5,554	70.63%	2,289	29.11%	2	0.03%	19	0.24%	0	0.00%	0	0.00%	3,265	41.52%	7,864
Luce	1,531	84.26%	273	15.02%	1	0.06%	8	0.44%	0	0.00%	4	0.22%	1,258	69.24%	1,817
Mackinac	2,038	62.50%	1,214	37.23%	2	0.06%	6	0.18%	0	0.00%	1	0.03%	824	25.27%	3,261
Macomb	12,362	60.66%	7,921	38.87%	26	0.13%	48	0.24%	17	0.08%	6	0.03%	4,441	21.79%	20,380
Manistee	4,373	62.96%	2,530	36.42%	10	0.14%	9	0.13%	22	0.32%	2	0.03%	1,843	26.53%	6,946
Marquette	11,396	71.91%	4,254	26.84%	30	0.19%	21	0.13%	138	0.87%	9	0.06%	7,142	45.07%	15,848
Mason	4,395	73.52%	1,540	25.76%	15	0.25%	13	0.22%	9	0.15%	9	0.10%	2,855	47.76%	5,978
Mecosta	4,492	81.70%	976	17.75%	12	0.22%	13	0.24%	3	0.05%	2	0.04%	3,516	63.95%	5,498
Menominee	4,995	58.24%	3,524	41.09%	28	0.33%	15	0.17%	12	0.14%	3	0.03%	1,471	17.15%	8,577
Midland	4,409	79.31%	1,138	20.47%	4	0.07%	5	0.09%	0	0.00%	3	0.05%	3,271	58.84%	5,559
Missaukee	1,801	88.81%	219	10.80%	2	0.10%	6	0.30%	0	0.00%	0	0.00%	1,582	78.01%	2,028
Monroe	10,391	58.82%	7,219	40.87%	11	0.06%	34	0.19%	8	0.05%	2	0.01%	3,172	17.96%	17,665
Montcalm	7,897	84.47%	1,403	15.01%	16	0.17%	31	0.33%	0	0.00%	2	0.02%	6,494	69.46%	9,349
Montmorency	734	68.28%	334	31.07%	5	0.47%	2	0.19%	0	0.00%	0	0.00%	400	37.21%	1,075
Muskegon	17,247	77.27%	4,949	22.17%	45	0.20%	48	0.22%	26	0.12%	5	0.02%	12,298	55.10%	22,320
Newaygo	4,678	84.30%	846	15.25%	5	0.09%	18	0.32%	1	0.02%	1	0.02%	3,832	69.06%	5,549
Oakland	43,395	77.88%	12,070	21.66%	135	0.24%	41	0.07%	61	0.11%	20	0.04%	31,325	56.22%	55,722
Oceana	3,641	81.62%	787	17.64%	15	0.34%	14	0.31%	1	0.02%	3	0.07%	2,854	63.98%	4,461
Ogemaw	1,443	69.18%	635	30.44%	1	0.05%	6	0.29%	1	0.05%	0	0.00%	808	38.73%	2,086
Ontonagon	2,481	62.29%	1,257	31.56%	10	0.25%	4	0.10%	222	5.57%	9	0.23%	1,224	30.73%	3,983
Osceola	3,923	86.72%	583	12.89%	2	0.04%	14	0.31%	0	0.00%	2	0.04%	3,340	73.83%	4,524
Oscoda	504	89.68%	56	9.96%	2	0.36%	0	0.00%	0	0.00%	0	0.00%	448	79.72%	562
Otsego	1,102	71.14%	443	28.60%	2	0.13%	2	0.13%	0	0.00%	0	0.00%	659	42.54%	1,549
Ottawa	15,477	84.95%	2,686	14.74%	20	0.11%	29	0.16%	5	0.03%	2	0.01%	12,791	70.21%	18,219
Presque Isle	1,998	65.96%	1,013	33.44%	6	0.20%	8	0.26%	1	0.03%	3	0.10%	985	32.52%	3,029
Roscommon	820	77.07%	239	22.46%	3	0.28%	2	0.19%	0	0.00%	0	0.00%	581	54.61%	1,064
Saginaw	21,335	62.65%	12,516	36.75%	47	0.14%	119	0.35%	24	0.07%	15	0.04%	8,819	25.90%	34,056
Sanilac	7,524	77.77%	2,116	21.87%	7	0.07%	21	0.22%	3	0.03%	4	0.04%	5,408	55.90%	9,675
Schoolcraft	1,981	72.30%	732	26.72%	17	0.62%	7	0.26%	2	0.07%	1	0.04%	1,249	45.58%	2,740
Shiawassee	9,877	79.17%	2,545	20.40%	9	0.07%	41	0.33%	4	0.03%	0	0.00%	7,332	58.77%	12,476
St. Clair	18,345	71.68%	7,178	28.05%	19	0.07%	42	0.16%	4	0.02%	4	0.02%	11,167	43.63%	25,592
St. Joseph	8,683	74.62%	2,902	24.94%	21	0.18%	25	0.21%	1	0.01%	4	0.03%	5,781	49.68%	11,636
Tuscola	7,944	81.55%	1,745	17.91%	5	0.05%	47	0.48%	0	0.00%	0	0.00%	6,199	63.64%	9,741
Van Buren	9,408	78.03%	2,590	21.48%	31	0.26%	23	0.19%	2	0.02%	3	0.02%	6,818	56.55%	12,057
Washtenaw	18,801	74.96%	6,211	24.76%	21	0.08%	39	0.16%	8	0.03%	1	0.00%	12,590	50.20%	25,081
Wayne	263,981	61.95%	158,787	37.26%	1,347	0.32%	498	0.12%	1,147	0.27%	380	0.09%	105,194	24.69%	426,140
Wexford	5,045	88.00%	665	11.60%	10	0.17%	13	0.23%	0	0.00%	0	0.00%	4,380	76.40%	5,733
Total	961,179	69.94%	404,546	29.44%	2,850	0.21%	2,575	0.19%	2,537	0.18%	654	0.05%	556,633	40.50%	1,374,341

===== Counties that flipped from Democratic to Republican =====
- Alpena
- Arenac
- Bay
- Saginaw
