= Alex J. Groesbeck =

American politician

Alex Groesbeck
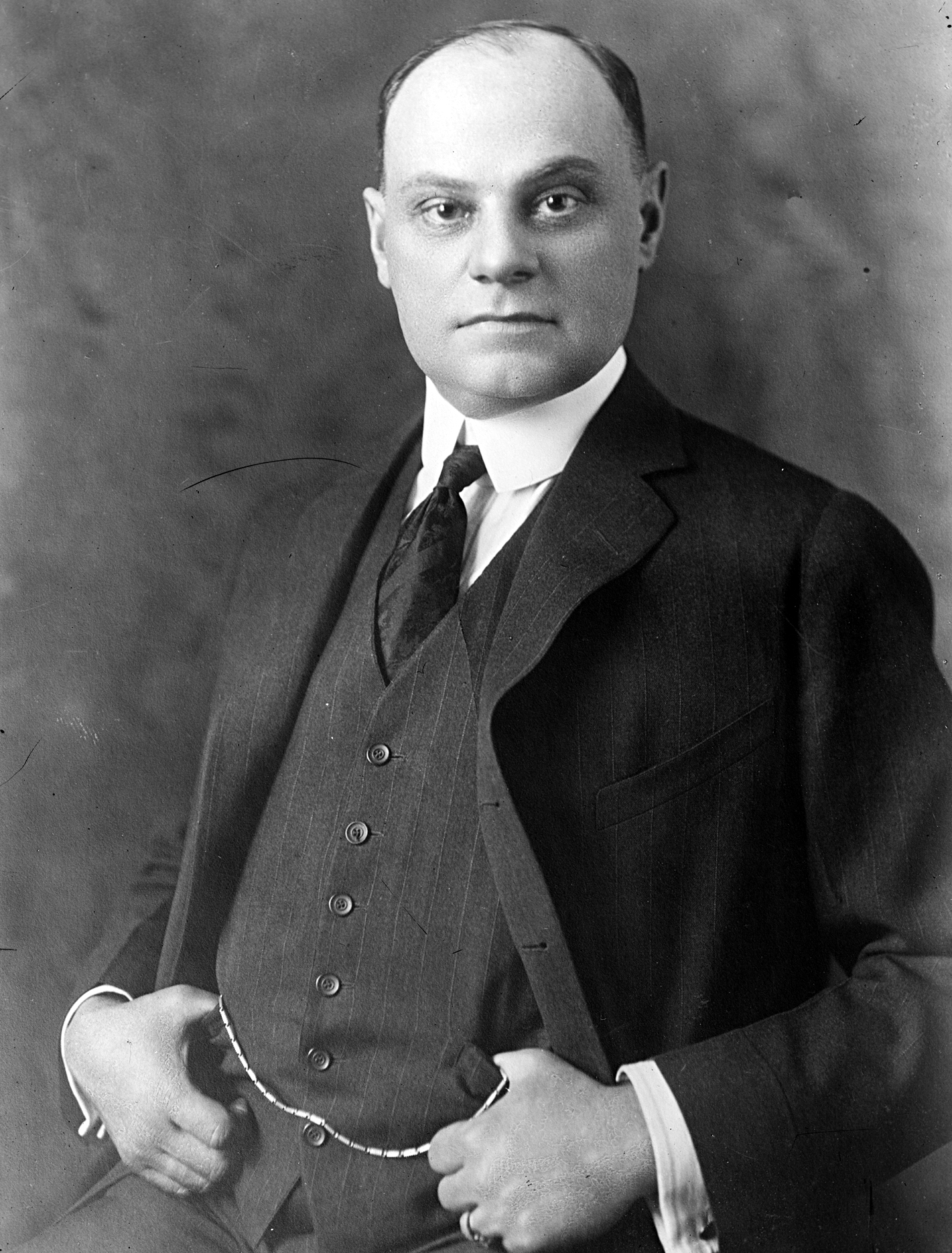

30th Governor of Michigan
- In office January 1, 1921 – January 1, 1927
- Lieutenant: Thomas Read; George W. Welsh
- Preceded by: Albert Sleeper
- Succeeded by: Fred W. Green

Attorney General of Michigan
- In office January 1, 1917 – January 1, 1921
- Governor: Albert Sleeper
- Preceded by: Grant Fellows
- Succeeded by: Merlin Wiley

Chair of the Michigan Republican Party
- In office 1912–1914
- Preceded by: Frank Knox
- Succeeded by: Gilman M. Dame

Personal details
- Born: Alexander Joseph Groesbeck; November 7, 1873 Warren, Michigan, U.S.
- Died: March 10, 1953 (aged 79) Detroit, Michigan, U.S.
- Resting place: Woodlawn Cemetery, Detroit
- Party: Republican
- Education: University of Michigan (LLB)

Alexander Joseph Groesbeck (November 7, 1873 – March 10, 1953) was an American politician who served as attorney general and the 30th governor of Michigan.

== Early life ==
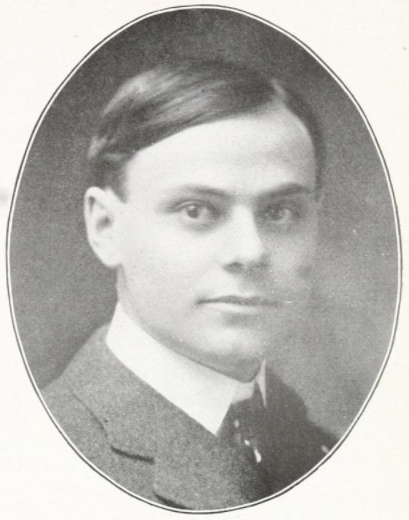
Groesbeck, 1904

Groesbeck was born in Warren, Michigan, the son of Macomb County Sheriff Louis Groesbeck and his wife Julia (Coquillard) Groesbeck. Groesbeck attended the public schools of Mount Clemens, Michigan, and of Wallaceburg, Ontario, where his parents resided for two years with their family. Groesbeck wanted to become a lawyer from an early age, and undertook the study of law in the office of an attorney at Port Huron, Michigan. He went on to earn a law degree from the University of Michigan at Ann Arbor in 1893. He was admitted to the bar that year and set up practice in Detroit where he rapidly gained the "respect, goodwill and confidence of his colleagues, because of his close conformity to the highest ethical standards of the profession".

== Politics ==
Groesbeck's entrance into state politics came in 1912 — he led efforts to select a delegation to the Republican National Convention favoring the renomination of President William Howard Taft. Groesbeck also actively led the party faction supporting Taft in the general election. That same year, Groesbeck was elected the state party chairman, serving until 1914. In 1914, he was a candidate for governor of Michigan, but lost in the Republican primary election to Chase S. Osborn. In 1916, Groesbeck was elected attorney general of Michigan, and was re-elected in 1918.

As reported in The New York Times, Attorney General Groesbeck supported a call for Henry Ford to run for the United States Senate as a Republican. This vision drew opposition from many other Republicans.

In 1920, he won the Republican primary election for governor and defeated Democrat and former governor Woodbridge N. Ferris in the general election. After being re-elected in 1922 and 1924, Groesbeck lost to Fred W. Green in the 1926 Republican primary election. In 1924, he was a delegate to the Republican National Convention, which chose President Calvin Coolidge to be re-elected. In addition to Groesbeck's political work, he was one of the builders of the Flint-Saginaw Interurban Railway.

At the Detroit Club, he was instrumental in 1922 in selecting James Couzens to be the successful Republican candidate for the Senate seat left vacant by Truman Newberry.

In 1925, Groesbeck vetoed legislation that would have created a state poet laureate. Time magazine reported:

Forgetful of the state poets of republican Athens, the Governor's historical knowledge led him to describe the bill as "a reversion to monarchical customs" which "has no place in a republican form of government."

During his six years in office, the state's highway growth continued, prison reform measures were sanctioned, state titles for automobiles began, and state government was restructured and consolidated.

He was defeated in the 1930 Republican primary election by Wilber M. Brucker.

Groesbeck is recognized as an important "road builder" in Michigan, being the first governor to champion the use of concrete and "take Michigan out of the mud."

In 1924, he opposed a ballot initiative (sponsored by the Public School Defense League) to require attendance at public schools and outlaw private ones; this placed him at odds with the position of the then increasingly popular Ku Klux Klan, which supported the opposing candidate, James Hamilton.

== Retirement, death and legacy ==
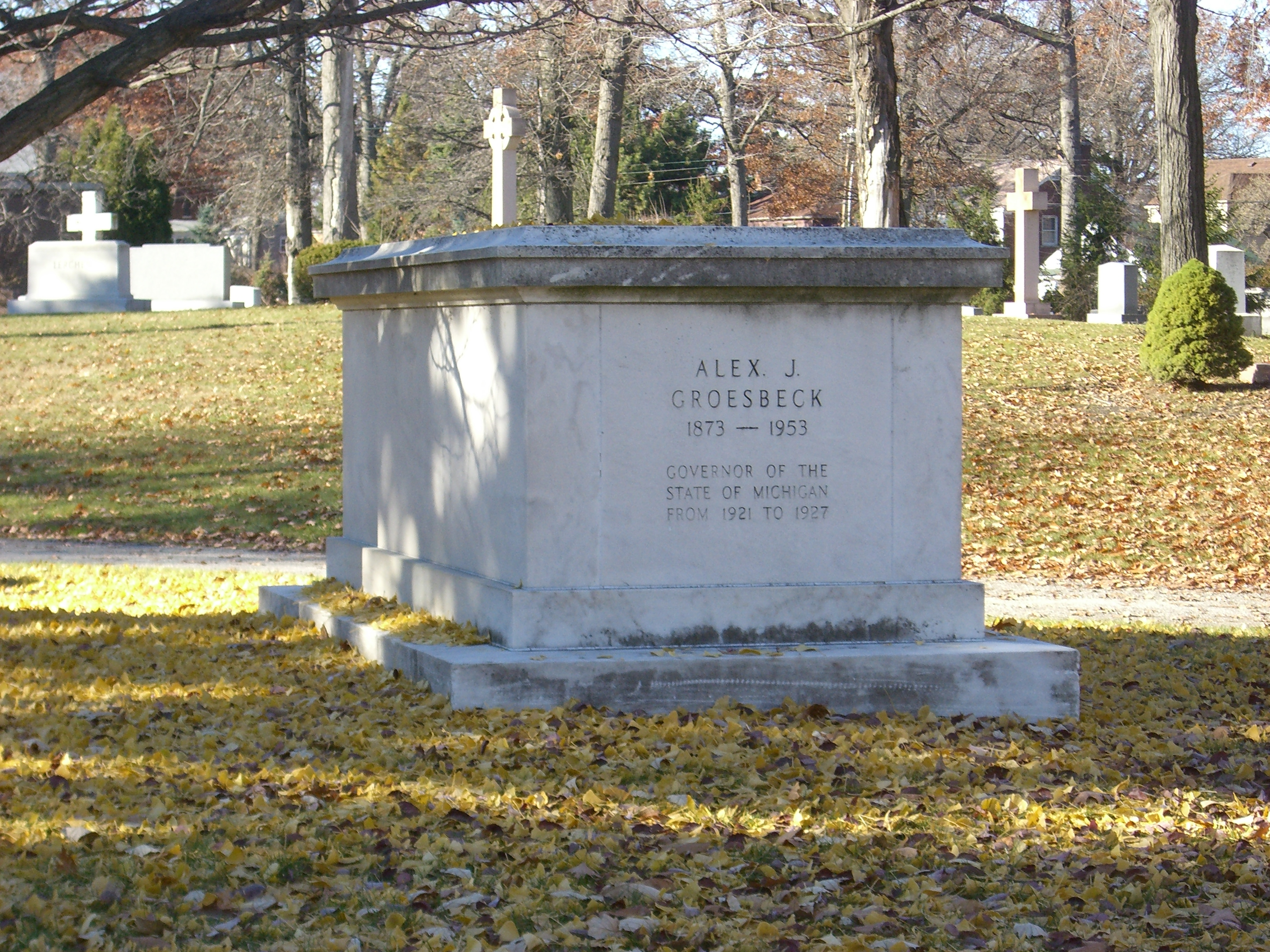
Groesbeck's tomb, at Woodlawn Cemetery, Detroit

Groesbeck was later appointed chairman of the Michigan Civil Service Commission, and served from 1941 to 1944. Also in 1944, he was a delegate to the Republican National Convention which nominated for U.S. president, Thomas Dewey, who would lose to the three-term President Franklin Roosevelt in the general election. He was also a member of the Detroit Bar Association, the Michigan Bar Association and the American Bar Association, and in club circles was well known as a member of the Detroit Club and the Detroit Athletic Club.

Groesbeck's gubernatorial papers are kept in the Archives of the State of Michigan.

He died in Detroit and is interred there at Woodlawn Cemetery.

Groesbeck Highway (M-97) was named for the governor, both because of the local prominence of the Groesbeck family in Macomb county and Oakland County and because of his strong support for building roads and highways in Michigan.

He is memorialized by a state historical marker in the City of Warren.

Party political offices
| Preceded by W. F. Knox | Chair of the Michigan Republican Party; 1912–1914 | Succeeded by Gilman M. Dame |
| Preceded by Albert Sleeper | Republican nominee for Governor of Michigan; 1920, 1922, 1924 | Succeeded by Fred W. Green |
Legal offices
| Preceded by Grant Fellows | Attorney General of Michigan; 1917–1921 | Succeeded by Merlin Wiley |
Political offices
| Preceded by Albert Sleeper | Governor of Michigan; 1921–1927 | Succeeded by Fred W. Green |
