= 1926 Michigan gubernatorial election =

- November 2, 1926
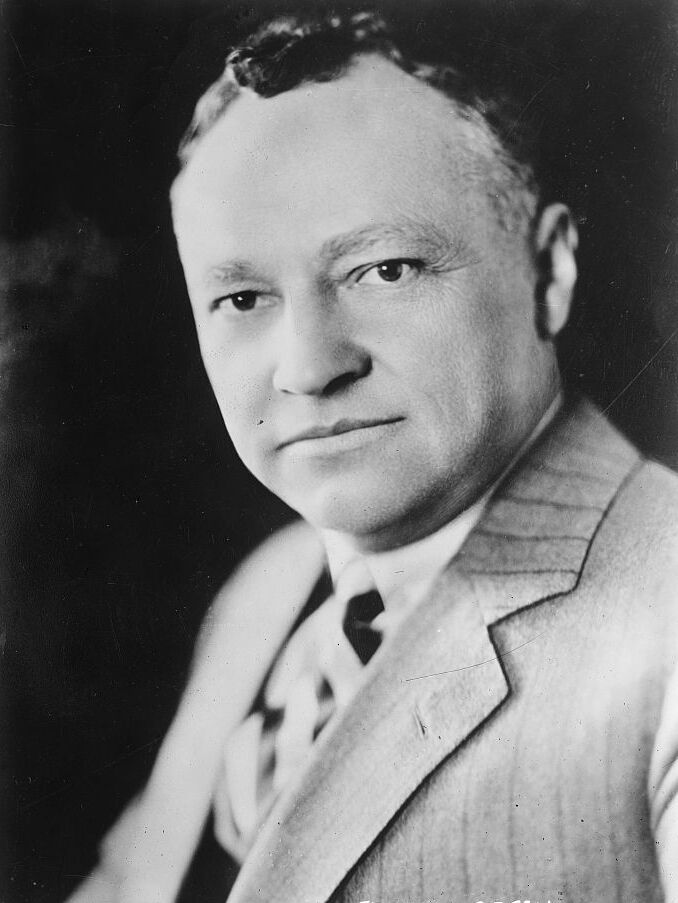

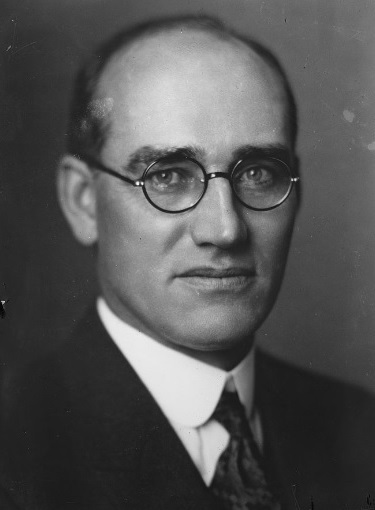
Nominee	Fred W. Green	William Comstock
Party	Republican	Democratic
Popular vote	399,564	227,155
Percentage	63.35%	36.01%
- County results Green: 50–60% 60–70% 70–80% 80–90% >90% Comstock: 50–60%
Governor before election
Alex J. Groesbeck
Republican
Elected Governor
Fred W. Green
Republican

The 1926 Michigan gubernatorial election was held on November 2, 1926. Republican nominee Fred W. Green defeated Democratic nominee William Comstock with 63.35% of the vote.

== Primary election ==
Michigan held primary elections on September 14, 1926.

=== Republican party ===
Incumbent governor Alex J. Groesbeck sought renomination for a fourth term but was defeated by Fred W. Green.

==== Candidates ====
- Fred W. Green, former mayor of Ionia
- Alex J. Groesbeck, incumbent governor

==== Results ====
Republican primary results
Party	Candidate	Votes	%
Republican	Fred W. Green	397,700	62.63%
Republican	Alex J. Groesbeck (inc.)	237,339	37.37%
Total votes		635,039	100.00%

=== Democratic party ===
William Comstock was unopposed for the Democratic nomination.

==== Candidates ====
- William Comstock, former chairman of the Michigan Democratic Party

==== Results ====
Democratic primary results
Party	Candidate	Votes	%
Democratic	William Comstock	17,688	100.00%
Total votes		17,688	100.00%

=== Minor parties ===
Prohibition primary results
Party	Candidate	Votes	%
Prohibition	Frank E. Titus	103	100.00%
Total votes		103	100.00%

Workers primary results
Party	Candidate	Votes	%
Workers	William Reynolds	241	100.00%
Total votes		241	100.00%

== General election ==
=== Candidates ===
Major party candidates

- Fred W. Green, Republican
- William Comstock, Democratic

Other candidates

- Frank E. Titus, Prohibition
- William Reynolds, Workers

=== Results ===
1926 Michigan gubernatorial election
Party	Candidate	Votes	%	±%
Republican	Fred W. Green	399,564	63.35%	−5.50%
Democratic	William Comstock	227,155	36.01%	+6.42%
Prohibition	Frank E. Titus	2,507	0.40%	−0.56%
Workers	William Reynolds	1,512	0.24%	
	Scattering	14	0.00%	
Majority		172,409	27.33%	
Total votes		630,752	100.00%	
Republican hold		Swing	-11.92%	

==== Results by county ====
Arenac County voted Democratic for the first time since 1896.

County	Fred W. Green Republican		William Comstock Democratic		Frank E. Titus Prohibition		William Reynolds Workers		Margin		Total votes cast
County	#	%	#	%	#	%	#	%	#	%	Total votes cast
Alcona	410	60.92%	262	38.93%	1	0.15%	0	0.00%	148	21.99%	673
Alger	1,080	57.17%	734	38.86%	7	0.37%	68	3.60%	346	18.32%	1,889
Allegan	4,808	81.77%	1,056	17.96%	14	0.24%	2	0.03%	3,752	63.81%	5,880
Alpena	1,303	34.43%	2,478	65.49%	2	0.05%	1	0.03%	-1,175	-31.05%	3,784
Antrim	1,224	84.82%	207	14.35%	10	0.69%	2	0.14%	1,017	70.48%	1,443
Arenac	893	48.85%	925	50.60%	9	0.49%	1	0.05%	-32	-1.75%	1,828
Baraga	2,850	86.65%	387	11.77%	5	0.15%	47	1.43%	2,463	74.89%	3,289
Barry	4,529	72.03%	1,737	27.62%	21	0.33%	1	0.02%	2,792	44.40%	6,288
Bay	5,002	46.17%	5,760	53.17%	63	0.58%	9	0.08%	-758	-7.00%	10,834
Benzie	906	83.04%	180	16.50%	4	0.37%	1	0.09%	726	66.54%	1,091
Berrien	10,412	65.79%	5,349	33.80%	56	0.35%	9	0.06%	5,063	31.99%	15,826
Branch	3,551	63.95%	1,984	35.73%	15	0.27%	3	0.05%	1,567	28.22%	5,553
Calhoun	7,652	66.96%	3,709	32.46%	54	0.47%	13	0.11%	3,943	34.50%	11,428
Cass	3,301	59.71%	2,211	40.00%	13	0.24%	3	0.05%	1,090	19.72%	5,528
Charlevoix	1,465	85.42%	238	13.88%	9	0.52%	3	0.17%	1,227	71.55%	1,715
Cheboygan	2,220	64.00%	1,241	35.77%	5	0.14%	3	0.09%	979	28.22%	3,469
Chippewa	2,633	71.78%	1,008	27.48%	14	0.38%	13	0.35%	1,625	44.30%	3,668
Clare	734	54.21%	614	45.35%	6	0.44%	0	0.00%	120	8.86%	1,354
Clinton	4,228	78.25%	1,165	21.56%	10	0.19%	0	0.00%	3,063	56.69%	5,403
Crawford	618	68.67%	275	30.56%	7	0.78%	0	0.00%	343	38.11%	900
Delta	2,051	64.60%	1,105	34.80%	12	0.38%	7	0.22%	946	29.80%	3,175
Dickinson	6,747	89.76%	734	9.76%	21	0.28%	15	0.20%	6,013	79.99%	7,517
Eaton	4,674	66.25%	2,357	33.41%	22	0.31%	2	0.03%	2,317	32.84%	7,055
Emmet	2,270	85.98%	352	13.33%	15	0.57%	3	0.11%	1,918	72.65%	2,640
Genesee	10,083	61.35%	6,284	38.23%	39	0.24%	30	0.18%	3,799	23.11%	16,436
Gladwin	1,216	67.48%	583	32.35%	2	0.11%	0	0.00%	633	35.13%	1,802 (Note: Includes 1 Scattering vote)
Gogebic	6,317	84.74%	1,007	13.51%	51	0.68%	76	1.02%	5,310	71.23%	7,455 (Note: Includes 4 Scattering votes)
Grand Traverse	2,108	81.48%	472	18.25%	7	0.27%	0	0.00%	1,636	63.24%	2,587
Gratiot	3,134	57.14%	2,322	42.33%	27	0.49%	1	0.02%	812	14.80%	5,485
Hillsdale	4,651	68.84%	2,087	30.89%	18	0.27%	0	0.00%	2,564	37.95%	6,756
Houghton	6,289	78.14%	1,640	20.38%	48	0.60%	71	0.88%	4,649	57.77%	8,048
Huron	3,693	52.08%	3,360	47.38%	36	0.51%	2	0.03%	333	4.70%	7,091
Ingham	11,695	52.57%	10,469	47.06%	68	0.31%	12	0.05%	1,226	5.51%	22,245
Ionia	10,643	85.54%	1,781	14.31%	18	0.14%	0	0.00%	8,862	71.23%	12,442
Iosco	843	59.70%	561	39.73%	5	0.35%	3	0.21%	282	19.97%	1,412
Iron	5,150	93.40%	334	6.06%	12	0.22%	18	0.33%	4,816	87.34%	5,514
Isabella	2,530	68.97%	1,107	30.18%	29	0.79%	2	0.05%	1,423	38.79%	3,668
Jackson	11,422	63.34%	6,507	36.09%	95	0.53%	7	0.04%	4,915	27.26%	18,032
Kalamazoo	9,423	61.91%	5,716	37.56%	73	0.48%	7	0.05%	3,707	24.36%	15,220
Kalkaska	603	86.14%	89	12.71%	8	1.14%	0	0.00%	514	73.43%	700
Kent	21,299	70.48%	8,769	29.02%	118	0.39%	34	0.11%	12,530	41.46%	30,220
Keweenaw	1,378	91.99%	82	5.47%	13	0.87%	25	1.67%	1,296	86.52%	1,498
Lake	669	82.49%	137	16.89%	3	0.37%	2	0.25%	532	65.60%	811
Lapeer	2,966	71.21%	1,172	28.14%	24	0.58%	1	0.02%	1,794	43.07%	4,165 (Note: Includes 2 Scattering votes)
Leelanau	879	86.52%	132	12.99%	5	0.49%	0	0.00%	747	73.52%	1,016
Lenawee	7,553	67.10%	3,635	32.29%	62	0.55%	6	0.05%	3,918	34.81%	11,256
Livingston	3,426	58.43%	2,416	41.21%	21	0.36%	0	0.00%	1,010	17.23%	5,863
Luce	645	86.46%	95	12.73%	5	0.67%	1	0.13%	550	73.73%	746
Mackinac	1,513	60.11%	995	39.53%	9	0.36%	0	0.00%	518	20.58%	2,517
Macomb	7,427	62.62%	4,364	36.79%	56	0.47%	14	0.12%	3,063	25.82%	11,861
Manistee	3,044	72.53%	1,117	26.61%	13	0.31%	23	0.55%	1,927	45.91%	4,197
Marquette	4,514	77.68%	1,214	20.89%	39	0.67%	44	0.76%	3,300	56.79%	5,811
Mason	1,914	71.13%	765	28.43%	7	0.26%	5	0.19%	1,149	42.70%	2,691
Mecosta	2,060	74.07%	705	25.35%	14	0.50%	2	0.07%	1,355	48.72%	2,781
Menominee	2,774	50.84%	2,650	48.57%	22	0.40%	10	0.18%	124	2.27%	5,456
Midland	1,916	63.72%	1,070	35.58%	21	0.70%	0	0.00%	846	28.13%	3,007
Missaukee	719	81.06%	161	18.15%	7	0.79%	0	0.00%	558	62.91%	887
Monroe	4,979	53.43%	4,318	46.34%	18	0.19%	3	0.03%	661	7.09%	9,318
Montcalm	5,181	82.25%	1,104	17.53%	11	0.17%	3	0.05%	4,077	64.72%	6,299
Montmorency	362	60.33%	237	39.50%	1	0.17%	0	0.00%	125	20.83%	600
Muskegon	6,564	72.58%	2,417	26.72%	35	0.39%	28	0.31%	4,147	45.85%	9,044
Newaygo	2,967	79.33%	767	20.51%	6	0.16%	0	0.00%	2,200	58.82%	3,740
Oakland	8,789	52.34%	7,863	46.83%	89	0.53%	50	0.30%	926	5.51%	16,791
Oceana	1,877	85.20%	310	14.07%	15	0.68%	1	0.05%	1,567	71.13%	2,203
Ogemaw	644	56.00%	502	43.65%	4	0.35%	0	0.00%	142	12.35%	1,150
Ontonagon	2,226	72.32%	700	22.74%	10	0.32%	142	4.61%	1,526	49.58%	3,078
Osceola	1,998	82.26%	424	17.46%	7	0.29%	0	0.00%	1,574	64.80%	2,429
Oscoda	208	82.21%	43	17.00%	0	0.00%	0	0.00%	165	65.22%	253
Otsego	518	73.27%	184	26.03%	5	0.71%	0	0.00%	334	47.24%	707
Ottawa	5,984	75.97%	1,871	23.75%	19	0.24%	3	0.04%	4,113	52.22%	7,877
Presque Isle	671	55.50%	533	44.09%	1	0.08%	4	0.33%	138	11.41%	1,209
Roscommon	578	70.23%	245	29.77%	0	0.00%	0	0.00%	333	40.46%	823
Saginaw	7,906	44.43%	9,772	54.91%	101	0.57%	16	0.09%	-1,866	-10.49%	17,795
Sanilac	7,103	85.62%	1,177	14.19%	14	0.17%	2	0.02%	5,926	71.43%	8,296
Schoolcraft	1,742	80.61%	412	19.07%	2	0.09%	5	0.23%	1,330	61.55%	2,161
Shiawassee	3,847	61.99%	2,296	37.00%	61	0.98%	2	0.03%	1,551	24.99%	6,206
St. Clair	7,535	60.98%	4,799	38.84%	20	0.16%	3	0.02%	2,736	22.14%	12,357
St. Joseph	3,523	57.12%	2,616	42.41%	28	0.45%	1	0.02%	907	14.70%	6,168
Tuscola	4,507	75.70%	1,433	24.07%	13	0.22%	1	0.02%	3,074	51.63%	5,954
Van Buren	4,475	77.05%	1,315	22.64%	15	0.26%	2	0.03%	3,160	54.41%	5,808
Washtenaw	6,358	51.96%	5,848	47.79%	28	0.23%	3	0.02%	510	4.17%	12,237
Wayne	76,896	53.46%	65,663	45.65%	627	0.44%	641	0.45%	11,233	7.81%	143,827
Wexford	2,069	82.23%	440	17.49%	7	0.28%	0	0.00%	1,629	64.75%	2,516
Total	399,564	63.35%	227,155	36.01%	2,507	0.40%	1,512	0.24%	172,409	27.33%	630,752

===== Counties that flipped from Democratic to Republican =====
- Barry
- Branch
- Cass
- Clinton
- Eaton
- Gratiot
- Hillsdale
- Ionia
- Lapeer
- Lenawee
- Livingston
- Montcalm
- Newaygo
- Oceana
- Shiawassee
- St. Joseph

===== Counties that flipped from Republican to Democratic =====
- Alpena
- Arenac
- Bay
- Saginaw
