= Wilber M. Brucker =

American politician (1894–1968)

Wilber Brucker
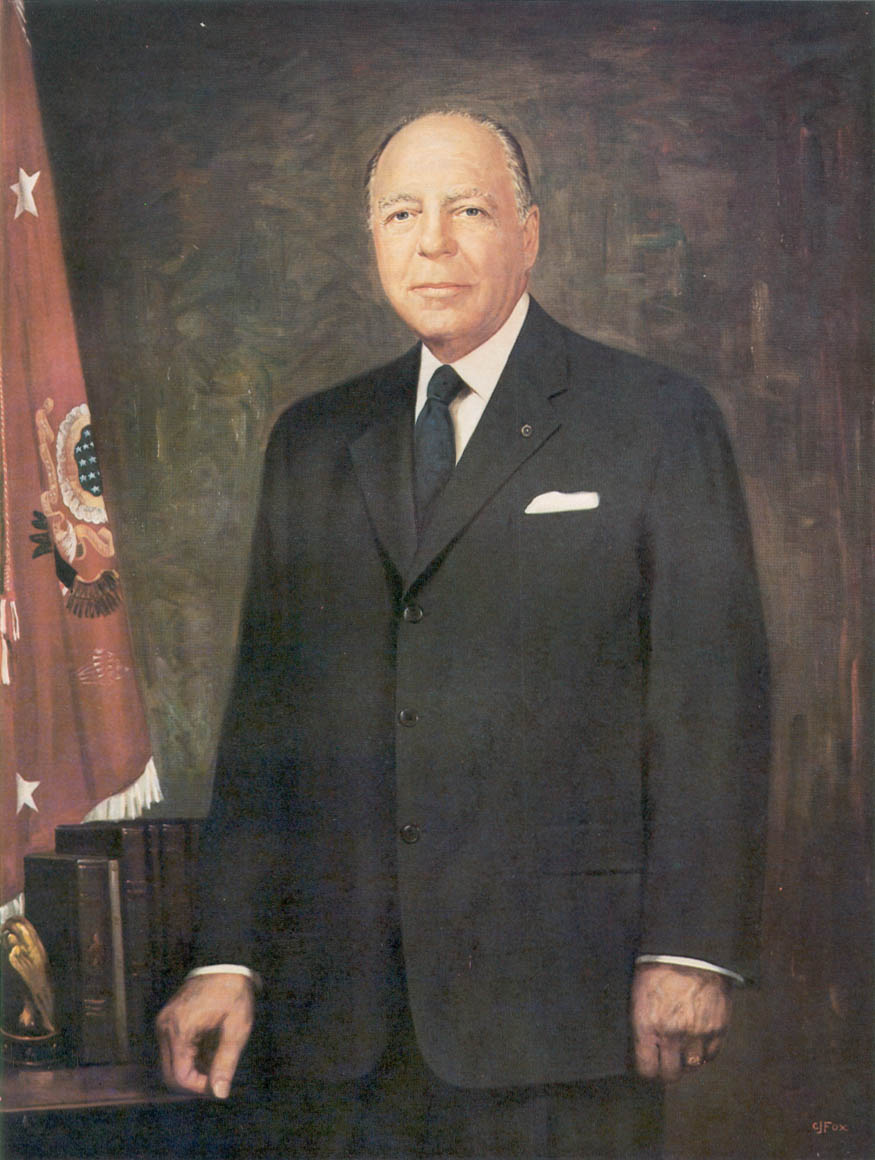
- Official portrait, c. 1961

5th United States Secretary of the Army
- In office July 21, 1955 – January 19, 1961
- President: Dwight D. Eisenhower
- Preceded by: Robert T. Stevens
- Succeeded by: Elvis Jacob Stahr Jr.

32nd Governor of Michigan
- In office January 1, 1931 – January 1, 1933
- Lieutenant: Luren Dickinson
- Preceded by: Fred W. Green
- Succeeded by: William Comstock

35th Attorney General of Michigan
- In office February 16, 1928 – January 1, 1931
- Governor: Fred W. Green
- Preceded by: William Potter
- Succeeded by: Paul W. Voorhies

Personal details
- Born: June 23, 1894 Saginaw, Michigan, U.S.
- Died: October 28, 1968 (aged 74) Detroit, Michigan, U.S.
- Party: Republican
- Spouse: Clara Hantel
- Children: 1
- Relatives: Ferdinand Brucker (father)
- Education: University of Michigan, Ann Arbor (LLB); Hillsdale College (MA, PhD)

Military service
- Branch/service: Army National Guard; United States Army Reserves
- Years of service: 1916–1919; 1919–1937 (Reserves)
- Rank: Second Lieutenant
- Unit: Michigan National Guard

Wilber Marion Brucker (June 23, 1894 – October 28, 1968) was an American Republican politician. Born in Saginaw, Michigan, he served as the 32nd governor of Michigan from 1931 to 1933 and as the United States Secretary of the Army between July 21, 1955, and January 19, 1961.

== Early life ==
Brucker was born in Saginaw, Michigan, the son of Democratic U.S. Representative Ferdinand Brucker. He graduated from the University of Michigan Law School in 1916 and enlisted in the Michigan National Guard, serving with its 33rd Infantry Regiment on the Mexican border during the Pancho Villa Expedition from 1916 to 1917. He attended Officer Training Camp at Fort Sheridan, Illinois, and was commissioned a second lieutenant. Brucker served in France during World War I with the 166th Infantry, 42d Division, in the Château Thierry, St. Mihiel, and Meuse-Argonne operations, 1917–1918. He received the Silver Star and Purple Heart, and remained a member of the Officer Reserve Corps until 1937.

== Politics ==
A Republican, after the war, Brucker was assistant prosecuting attorney of Saginaw County from 1919 to 1923, and then prosecuting attorney from 1923 to 1927. He married Clara Helen Hantel in 1923. He served as assistant attorney general of Michigan, 1927–1928, and as Michigan Attorney General, 1928–1930.

In 1930 he was elected as Michigan's 32nd governor, serving one term until being defeated in 1932 by Democrat William Comstock. During his two years in office, the police force in Michigan increased and a new state police headquarters in Lansing was authorized. Also Michigan enacted legislation that allowed grand juries to investigate allegations of municipal government fraud and mismanagement. In 1936, Brucker defeated incumbent U.S. Senator James Couzens in the Republican primary elections, but lost to Democrat Prentiss M. Brown in the general election.

He was a member of the law firm of Clark, Klein, Brucker, and Waples, 1937–1954, and served as General Counsel of the Department of Defense from 1954 to 1955, during the Army–McCarthy hearings.

In 1955, Brucker was appointed by U.S. President Dwight D. Eisenhower as Secretary of the Army, serving from July 21, 1955, to January 19, 1961. Brucker administered the Army during a period of major technological advance, especially in the missile-satellite field, and at a time when the Army's place in the national defense structure was overshadowed by a philosophy of "massive retaliation". Under his direction the Army instituted a five-element (pentagonal) organization concept for the division, established a Strategic Army Corps for emergency reaction, launched the United States' first satellite, Explorer I, and adopted the Army Flag.

== Death ==
Brucker returned to legal practice in Detroit with the firm of Brucker and Brucker, 1961–1968, and was a member of the Board of Directors of Freedoms Foundation. He died in Detroit on October 28, 1968, and was buried at Arlington National Cemetery.

== Legacy ==
Brucker Hall at Joint Base Myer–Henderson Hall is named for him.

== Additional resources ==
- "Wilber Marion Brucker". The Political Graveyard.
- National Governors Association
- Wilber M. Brucker Papers at the Bentley Historical Library
- Autobiography of Clara H. Brucker, wife of Wilber M. Brucker "To Have Your Cake and Eat It"

Legal offices
Preceded by William Potter	Attorney General of Michigan; 1928–1931	Succeeded by Paul W. Voorhies
Party political offices
Preceded by Fred W. Green	Republican nominee for Governor of Michigan; 1930, 1932	Succeeded by Frank Fitzgerald
Preceded by James J. Couzens	Republican nominee for U.S. Senator from Michigan (Class 2); 1936	Succeeded by Homer S. Ferguson
Political offices
Preceded by Fred W. Green	Governor of Michigan; 1931–1933	Succeeded by William Comstock
Preceded by Robert T. Stevens	United States Secretary of the Army; 1955–1961	Succeeded by Elvis Jacob Stahr Jr.
