= Fred W. Green =

American politician (1871–1936)

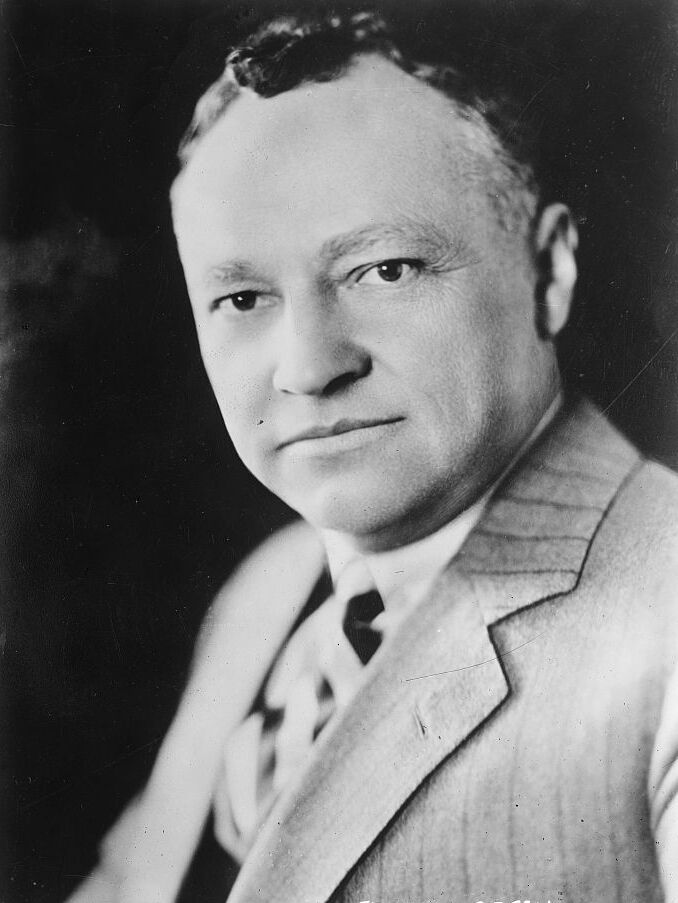
- Green c. 1927

31st Governor of Michigan
- In office January 1, 1927 – January 1, 1931
- Lieutenant: Luren D. Dickinson
- Preceded by: Alex J. Groesbeck
- Succeeded by: Wilber M. Brucker

Personal details
- Born: October 19, 1871 Manistee, Michigan, U.S.
- Died: November 30, 1936 (aged 65) Munising, Michigan, U.S.
- Party: Republican
- Spouse: Helen Adeline Kelly
- Children: 1
- Education: University of Michigan Law School
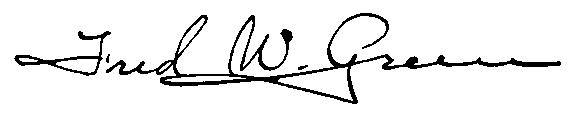
- Signature

Fred Warren Green (October 19, 1871 – November 30, 1936) was an American politician who served as the 31st governor of Michigan from 1927 to 1931, and he was the mayor of Ionia, Michigan, from 1913 to 1916. Active in athletics during his time as a student at Michigan State Normal School (now Eastern Michigan University), and at the University of Michigan, Green earned a varsity letter playing for the Michigan State Normal football team in 1895 and is credited as the team's head coach during the 1896 season in which they were declared champions of the Michigan Intercollegiate Athletic Association. Green served as a delegate to the 1932 and 1936 Republican National Conventions.

== Early life ==
=== Education and athletics ===
Green was born in Manistee, Michigan, and grew up in Cadillac, son of Holden Nathaniel Green and his wife Adaline Green (née Clark). His education was attained in Ypsilanti at Michigan State Normal School (now Eastern Michigan University), where he graduated in 1893, and at the University of Michigan at Ann Arbor, where he earned a law degree in 1898. When Michigan State Normal joined the Michigan Intercollegiate Athletic Association in 1892, Green was selected as the school's first representative to the athletic conference. From 1893 to 1895, Green worked as a reporter in Ypsilanti. During this time, he continued his involvement in Michigan State Normal athletics, serving as Manager of Foot Ball for the Normal Athletic Association during the first term of 1893–94 academic year and as Director of Sports during the second term. In 1895, Green earned a varsity letter as a member of the Michigan State Normal football team. The following year, in 1896, he coached the football team to a 4–1 record. Michigan Normal was named the Michigan Intercollegiate Athletic Association champions that season with a record of 2–0 in the conference. The team's sole loss came against the University of Michigan football team, the only team that scored against the Normalites that season. While a student at Michigan, Green was the Class Athletic Manager during the 1897–98 academic year.

==== Head coaching record ====
Year	Team	Overall	Conference	Standing	Bowl/playoffs
Michigan State Normal Normalites (Michigan Intercollegiate Athletic Association) (1896)
1896	Michigan State Normal	4–1	2–0	1st	
Michigan State Normal:		4–1	2–0		
Total:		4–1			
National championship Conference title Conference division title or championship game berth

=== Military service and legal work ===
Green served in the U.S. Army during the Spanish–American War. He was a first lieutenant in the 31st Michigan Volunteer Infantry and later was promoted to battalion adjutant. After the war, he returned to Ypsilanti as the city attorney, as well as attorney for the Ypsilanti Reed Furniture Company, a business he later owned in a partnership. His furniture company in Ionia was "one of the largest industries of its kind in the country".

== Politics ==
In 1904, he moved the business to Ionia, Michigan. He was a delegate to Republican National Convention from Michigan in 1912, where U.S. President William Howard Taft was renominated. Green served as mayor of Ionia from 1913 to 1916 and was instrumental in the establishing the Ionia Free Fair in 1915, which, at one time, was the world's largest free admission event of its kind. From 1915 to 1919, he was treasurer of the Michigan Republican Party. In 1920, he was a delegate to the Republican National Convention that nominated Warren G. Harding for president.

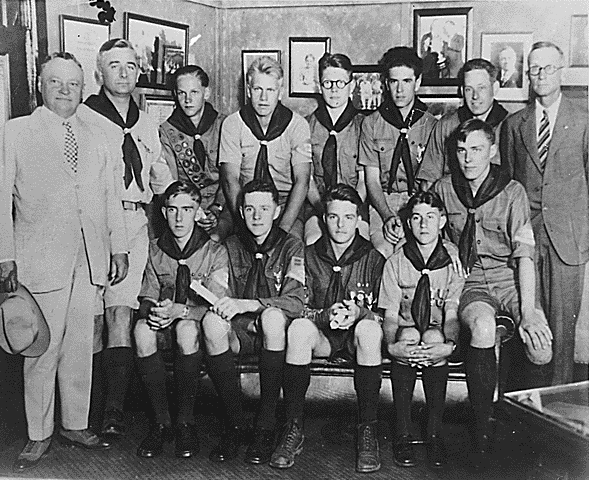
Governor Fred Green (far left, holding hat) with Eagle Scouts— including future President Gerald Ford (to highlight, click here)— on Mackinac Island, Michigan (1929)

On November 2, 1926, Green was elected governor of Michigan. He was re-elected to a second two-year term in 1928. On May 18, 1927, the afternoon of the Bath School disaster, Green assisted in the relief work, carting bricks away from the scene. In 1928, he served as a delegate to the RNC which nominated Commerce Secretary Herbert Hoover for president. Howard C. Lawrence was Green's secretary and business partner. During his administration, Green expanded a fish planting program and took part in the acquisition of seven state parks. He initiated a comprehensive budget system, authorized a new code of criminal practices, secured appropriations for a state hospital building program, and improved workmen's compensation.

The Green administration was notably important in modernizing Michigan's highways. He is touted as the "inventor of the no passing lane", which was adopted as an important safety improvement throughout the country. He was also an early proponent of the Mackinac Bridge.

On October 22, 1927, Governor Green participated in the dedication of the new University of Michigan Football Stadium: "Michigan Governor Fred W. Green and his Ohio counterpart Vince Donahey, and Presidents C. C. Little of Michigan and George W. Rightmire of Ohio, led the massed bands of the two universities onto the field from the east tunnel. The bands paraded to the flag pole where the national ensign was raised and the vast throng stood bareheaded during the playing of the 'Star Spangled Banner' and 'The Yellow and Blue.'"

In 1927, he appointed Arthur Hendrick Vandenberg, who was editor of the Grand Rapids Herald, to the U.S. Senate to replace as the late Senator Woodbridge N. Ferris. He chose Vandenberg only when pressured to do so by the state Republican organization.

In 1928, Green's campaign created the slogan "Keep Michigan Green" as a part of a fire prevention program.

A portrait of Governor Green is held in the collections of the Michigan State Capitol. Painted by Robert Grafton in 1931, the portrait is a naturalistic rendering of the governor in an outdoor setting. He is dressed for a hunt and flanked by his two hunting dogs. Though the portrait is not currently on public display, further information about it can be found at the Capitol's website.

== Retirement and death ==
After leaving office, Green returned to his favorite pastime of hunting and fishing. In 1932, Green served as a delegate to the RNC which nominated Herbert Hoover for re-election, who was defeated by Franklin D. Roosevelt. In 1936, he again served as a delegate to the RNC which nominated Alf Landon for president, who was also unsuccessful at unseating Roosevelt. He was a Presbyterian and a member of the Freemasons, Elks and Rotary.

Fred Green died in Munising Hospital in Munising, Michigan, on November 30, 1936, ten days after suffering a heart attack while on a deer hunting trip. He is entombed in a mausoleum at the Highland Park Cemetery in Ionia, Michigan.

His accumulated papers, two linear feet and five volumes, are at the Bentley Historical Library at the University of Michigan.

== Sources ==
- Political Graveyard: Index to Politicians: Green, E to F

Party political offices
Preceded by Alex J. Groesbeck	Republican nominee for Governor of Michigan; 1926, 1928	Succeeded by Wilber M. Brucker
Political offices
Preceded by Alex J. Groesbeck	Governor of Michigan; 1927–1931	Succeeded by Wilber M. Brucker
