= Kephart =

Kephart may refer to:

== People ==
- Beth Kephart, American author of non-fiction, poetry and young adult fiction
- Calvin Ira Kephart (1883–1969), American law professor
- Elza Kephart (born 1976), Canadian director, producer, and writer
- Horace Kephart (1862–1931), American travel writer and librarian
- Jeffrey Owen Kephart, American engineer
- William P. Kephart (1915–1942), American naval officer

== Places ==
- Mount Kephart, in the central Great Smoky Mountains, Southeastern United States

== Other uses ==
- USS Kephart (DE-207), a Buckley-class destroyer escort

== See also ==
- Gephardt, surname
