= List of Delta Theta Phi chapters =

Delta Theta Phi is an American professional law fraternity and a member of the Professional Fraternity Association. It was established September 26, 1913, by the merger of three law fraternities: Alpha Kappa Phi, Delta Phi Delta, and Theta Lambda Phi. The merged chapters continued to use their original charter dates, rather than the merger date. Delta Theta Phi merged with Sigma Nu Phi in 1989.

Following is an incomplete list of the fraternity's senates or chapters, with active chapters in bold and inactive chapters and institutions in italics.

| Chapter | Date | Institution | Location | Status | Reference |
|---|---|---|---|---|---|
| Ranney (see William McKinley) | September 15, 1900 | Cleveland Law School | Cleveland, Ohio | | (Note: Chapter formed from the Alpha chapter of Delta Phi Delta at the Cleveland Law School, which merged with the John Marshall School of Law in 1946, and is now the Cleveland State University College of Law.) |
| Wigmore | 1902–1951 | Northwestern University Pritzker School of Law | Chicago, Illinois | Inactive | (Note: Chapter formed from the Alpha chapter of Alpha Kappa Phi.) |
| Holmes | 1903–1932 | Dickinson College | Carlisle, Pennsylvania | Inactive | (Note: Chapter formed from the Holmes chapter of Theta Lambda Phi. Dickinson's Law School merged with Penn State University in 2000.) |
| Cooley | 1903 | Detroit College of Law (now Michigan State University College of Law) | East Lansing, Michigan | | (Note: Chapter formed from merging the Cooley chapter of Theta Lambda Phi, established in 1903, and the Delta chapter of Delta Phi Delta, established in 1907.) |
| Finch | 1903–1953 | Cornell Law School | Ithaca, New York | Inactive | (Note: Chapter formed from the Finch chapter of Theta Lambda Phi.) |
| Bleckley | 1904–1915, 1947 | University of Georgia School of Law | Athens, Georgia | | (Note: Chapter formed from the Bleckley chapter of Theta Lambda Phi.) |
| **Harlan-McKusick** | 1904 | University of South Dakota School of Law | Vermillion, South Dakota | Active | (Note: Chapter formed from the Beta chapter of Delta Phi Delta.) |
| **Freeman** | 1904–1912, 1966 | University of Tennessee College of Law | Knoxville, Tennessee | Active | (Note: Chapter originated as the Reese Law Club in 1898 and became the Freeman chapter of Theta Lambda Phi in 1903.) |
| Warvelle | 1904 | DePaul University College of Law | Chicago, Illinois | | (Note: Chapter formed from the Beta chapter of Alpha Kappa Phi.) |
| Mitchell | 1905 | University of Minnesota Law School | Minneapolis, Minnesota | | (Note: Chapter formed from the merger of the Gamma chapter of Delta Phi Delta, established in 1905, and the Zeta chapter of Alpha Kappa Phi, established in 1909.) |
| **Day** | 1905 | Case Western Reserve University School of Law | Cleveland, Ohio | Active | (Note: Chapter formed from the Day chapter of Theta Lambda Phi at the Franklin Thomas Backus Law School, now Case Western Reserve University School of Law.) (Note: Chapter formed at Franklin Thomas Backus, now Case Western Reserve University School of Law.) |
| Kent | 1907–1955 | New York Law School | Tribeca, New York City, New York | Inactive | (Note: Chapter formed from the Kent chapter of Theta Lambda Phi.) |
| Lurton | 1907–1942 | Chattanooga College of Law | Chattanooga, Tennessee | Inactive | (Note: Chapter formed from the Lurton chapter of Theta Lambda Phi. The college closed in 1942.) |
| Epsilon (see Joseph T. Robinson) | 1908–1913 | University of Arkansas School of Law | Fayetteville, Arkansas | Consolidated | (Note: Chapter formed from the Epsilon chapter of Delta Phi Delta. It consolidated with the Robinson chapter in 1913.) |
| Douglas | 1908 | University of Illinois Chicago School of Law | Chicago, Illinois | | (Note: Chapter formed from the merger of Gamma chapter of Alpha Kappa Phi, established in 1909, and the Zeta chapter of Delta Phi Delta, established in 1912, at the John Marshall Law School, which merged with the University of Illinois at Chicago in 2019, becoming the UIC John Marshall Law School.) |
| Lincoln | 1909–1934 | University of Chicago Law School | Chicago, Illinois | Inactive | (Note: Chapter formed from the Delta chapter of Alpha Kappa Phi.) |
| Burks | 1909–1918, 1958 | Washington and Lee University School of Law | Lexington, Virginia | | (Note: Chapter formed from the Burks chapter of Theta Lambda Phi.) |
| Magruder (see **Daniel Webster**) | 1909–1923 | Chicago-Kent College of Law | Chicago, Illinois | Consolidated | (Note: Chapter formed from Eta chapter of Alpha Kappa Phi. Later, it consolidated with Webster chapter when Chicago-Kent merged with Webster College.) |
| **Ramsey** | 1910 | William Mitchell College of Law | Saint Paul, Minnesota | Active | (Note: Chapter formed from the Eta chapter of Delta Phi Delta.) |
| Marshall | 1910–1938, 1946 | Claude W. Pettit College of Law | Ada, Ohio | | (Note: Chapter formed from the Marshall chapter of Theta Lambda Phi at Ohio Northern.) |
| Von Moschzisker | 1910–1928 | University of Pennsylvania Law School | Philadelphia, Pennsylvania | Inactive | (Note: Chapter formed from the Von Moschzisker chapter of Theta Lambda Phi.) |
| E. D. White | 1910 | Georgetown University Law Center | Washington, D.C. | | (Note: Chapter formed from the White chapter of Theta Lambda Phi.) |
| Parker | 1910–1915 | Union College | Schenectady, New York | Inactive | (Note: Chapter formed from the Parker chapter of Theta Lambda Phi.) |
| Jefferson | 1911–1937, 1946 | University of Richmond School of Law | Richmond, Virginia | | (Note: Chapter formed from the Jefferson chapter of Theta Lambda Phi.) |
| Ingalls | 1912 –197x ?, 1981 | Washburn University School of Law | Topeka, Kansas | | (Note: Chapter formed from Theta chapter of Alpha Kappa Phi.) |
| Christiancy | 1912 | University of Michigan Law School | Ann Arbor, Michigan | | (Note: Chapter formed from the Iota chapter of Alpha Kappa Phi.) |
| Bryan | 1912 | Creighton University School of Law | Omaha, Nebraska | | (Note: Chapter formed from the Theta chapter of Delta Phi Delta.) |
| Field | 1912 | USC Gould School of Law | Los Angeles, California | | (Note: Chapter formed from the Field chapter of Theta Lambda Phi.) |
| Fuller | 1912 | Fordham University School of Law | Manhattan, New York City, New York | | (Note: Chapter formed from the Fuller chapter of Theta Lambda Phi.) |
| Benton | 1912 | Washington University School of Law | St. Louis, Missouri | | (Note: Chapter formed from the Iota chapter of Delta Phi Delta) |
| Deady | 1913–1926, 1948 | University of Oregon School of Law | Eugene, Oregon | | (Note: Chapter formed from the Deady chapter of Theta Lambda Phi.) |
| Chase | 1913 | Ohio State University Moritz College of Law | Columbus, Ohio | | (Note: Chapter formed from the Chase chapter of Theta Lambda Phi.) |
| Wayne | 1914 | Atlanta Law School | Atlanta, Georgia | Inactive | (Note: This school closed in 1994.) |
| Dwight | 1914–1932 | Columbia Law School | New York City, New York | Inactive | |
| **Daniel Webster** (see Magruder) | 1915 | Chicago-Kent College of Law | Chicago, Illinois | Active | (Note: Chapter was chartered at the Webster College of Law in Chicago. In 1923, the chapter consolidated with Magruder chapter when Webster merged with Chicago-Kent.) |
| Snyder | 1915–1939, 1947 | University of Missouri–Kansas City School of Law | Kansas City, Missouri | | |
| John Adams | 1915 | Boston University School of Law | Boston, Massachusetts | | |
| Pitney | 1915–1953 | Rutgers Law School | Camden and Newark, New Jersey | Inactive | (Note: Chapter formed at the New Jersey Law School, now Rutgers Law School.) |
| Howat | 1915 | S.J. Quinney College of Law | Salt Lake City, Utah | | |
| **Hosmer** | 1916 | University of Detroit Mercy School of Law | Detroit, Michigan | Active | |
| Gibson | 1916–1936, 1947 | University of Pittsburgh School of Law | Pittsburgh, Pennsylvania | | |
| Russell | 1916–1916 | New York University School of Law | Manhattan, New York City, New York | Inactive | |
| Brewer | 1916 | University of Kansas School of Law | Lawrence, Kansas | | |
| Woodrow Wilson | 1916 | George Washington University Law School | Washington, D.C. | | |
| Sam Houston | 1916–1941, 1948 | University of Texas School of Law | Austin, Texas | | |
| William McKinley (see Ranney) | 1919–1946 | John Marshall School of Law | Cleveland, Ohio | Consolidated | (Note: Chapter consolidated with Ranney chapter when the John Marshall School of Law merged with the Cleveland Law School to form Cleveland-Marshall Law School.) |
| Robert E. Lee | 1919 | University of Virginia School of Law | Charlottesville, Virginia | | |
| **Chester Cicero Cole** | 1921 | Drake University Law School | Des Moines, Iowa | Active | |
| George H. Williams | 1921 | Northwestern College of Law | Portland, Oregon | | |
| Franz C. Eschweiler | 1921 | Marquette University Law School | Milwaukee, Wisconsin | | |
| John Forrest Dillon | 1921 | University of Iowa College of Law | Iowa City, Iowa | | |
| Howell E. Jackson | 1921–19xx ?, 1956 | Cecil C. Humphreys School of Law | Memphis, Tennessee | | |
| Bliss | 1921–1953 | University of Missouri School of Law | Columbia, Missouri | Inactive | |
| Alexander Hamilton | 1922 | Brooklyn Law School | New York City, New York | | |
| Roger Brooks Taney | 1922–1929, 1947 | University of Maryland Francis King Carey School of Law | Baltimore, Maryland | | |
| Samuel Maxwell | 1922 | University of Nebraska College of Law | Lincoln, Nebraska | Active | |
| Elihu Root | 1922 | Stanford Law School | Stanford, California | | |
| John Bell Keeble | 1922 | Vanderbilt University Law School | Nashville, Tennessee | | |
| Garrett McEnerney | 1922–1941 | UC Berkeley School of Law | Berkeley, California | Inactive | |
| Robert Armitage Bakewell | 1922 | Saint Louis University School of Law | St. Louis, Missouri | | |
| John Story | 1923 | University of Washington School of Law | Seattle, Washington | | |
| Wesley Newcomb Hohfeld | 1923–1929 | Yale Law School | New Haven, Connecticut | Inactive | |
| Daniel W. Voorhees | 1923–1942 | Indiana University Robert H. McKinney School of Law | Indianapolis, Indiana | Inactive | |
| William H. Battle | 1924–1931, 1947 | University of North Carolina School of Law | Chapel Hill, North Carolina | | |
| David Davis | 1925–1936, 1948 | University of Illinois College of Law | Champaign, Illinois | | (Note: Chapter formed from Lambda Epsilon Chi (local).) |
| Joseph McKenna | 1925 | Loyola University Chicago School of Law | Chicago, Illinois | | |
| John Donaldson Fleming | 1926–1932 | University of Colorado Law School | Boulder, Colorado | Inactive | |
| Edgar Howard Farrar | 1926 | Loyola University New Orleans College of Law | New Orleans, Louisiana | | |
| Judson Harmon | 1927–1930 | University of Cincinnati College of Law | Cincinnati, Ohio | Inactive | |
| John Hemphill | 1927 | Dedman School of Law | Dallas, Texas | | |
| David Demaree Banta | 1928–1930, 1947 | Indiana University Maurer School of Law | Bloomington, Indiana | | |
| Joseph Rucker Lamar | 1928–1930, 1947 | Mercer University School of Law | Macon, Georgia | | |
| Charles Beecher Warren | 1928 | Wayne State University Law School | Detroit, Michigan | | |
| Charles E. Wolverton | 1928 | Willamette University College of Law | Salem, Oregon | | |
| John Jay | 1928–1943, 1948 | St. John's University School of Law | Jamaica, Queens, New York City, New York | | |
| T. Austin Gavin | 1940 | University of Tulsa College of Law | Tulsa, Oklahoma | | |
| John W. Davis | 1941 | American University Washington College of Law | Washington, D.C. | | |
| Hughes (see Woodrow Wilson) | 1941–1954 | National University School of Law | Washington, D.C. | Consolidated | (Note: Chapter merged with the Woodrow Wilson chapter when National University merged with George Washington University Law School in 1954.) |
| **Joseph T. Robinson** | 1941–19xx ?, 2015 | University of Arkansas School of Law | Fayetteville, Arkansas | Active | |
| Taft | 1941 | University of Toledo College of Law | Toledo, Ohio | | |
| Vinson | 1947 | University of Florida Levin College of Law | Gainesville, Florida | | |
| Edmonson | 1947 | University of Oklahoma College of Law | Norman, Oklahoma | | |
| Hart | 1947 | William McKinley Law School | Canton, Ohio | Inactive | |
| Byrnes | 1947 | Duke University School of Law | Durham, North Carolina | | |
| Clay | 1948 | University of Louisville School of Law | Louisville, Kentucky | | |
| Green | 1948 | Cumberland School of Law | Homewood, Alabama | | |
| Lohnes | 1948–1954 | Columbus University | Washington, D.C. | Consolidated | (Note: Chapter consolidated with the chapter at Catholic University when Columbus University merged with the law program of CUA to become the Columbus School of Law at Catholic University of America.) |
| F. Warren (name later changed to Black) | 1948 | Stetson University College of Law | Gulfport, Florida | | |
| Alexander | 1949 | Baylor Law School | Waco, Texas | | |
| Cardozo | 1949 | University of Miami School of Law | Coral Gables, Florida | | |
| Evans | 1949 | University of Wisconsin Law School | Madison, Wisconsin | | |
| Rentner | 1949 | Valparaiso University School of Law | Valparaiso, Indiana | Inactive | (Note: The law school closed in 2020.) |
| Traynor | 1949 | University of California College of the Law, San Francisco | San Francisco, California | | (Note: Chapter formed at Hastings College of Law, now the University of California College of the Law, San Francisco.) |
| S. White | 1949 | Loyola Law School | Los Angeles, California | | |
| Bickett | 1950 | St. Mary's University School of Law | San Antonio, Texas | | |
| Loring (see **Ramsey**) | 1950 | | | Consolidated | (Note: Chapter consolidated with the Ramsey chapter.) |
| Cullen | 1955 | University of Houston Law Center | Houston, Texas | | |
| **E. E. Townes** | July 20, 1956 | South Texas College of Law Houston | Houston, Texas | Active | |
| Kerr | 1964 | Oklahoma City University | Oklahoma City | | |
| Barkley | 1966 | University of Kentucky Rosenberg College of Law | Lexington, Kentucky | | |
| Brandeis | 1966 | University of San Diego School of Law | San Diego, California | | |
| Catron | 1966 | Winston College of Law | Knoxville, Tennessee | | |
| Hughes (Note: Unclear if Charles Evans Hughes (1862–1948), Chief Justice of the U.S. Supreme Court, Secretary of State, governor of New York or Charles Evans Hughes Jr. (1889–1950), U.S. Solicitor General) | 1965 | Columbus School of Law | Washington, D.C. | | |
| Fuchsberg Senate | 1983 | Touro Law Center | Central Islip, New York | Active | |
| **Francis J. Larkin** | 1992 | University of Massachusetts School of Law | Dartmouth, Massachusetts | Active | (Note: Chapter was formed at the Southern New England School of Law, now UMass Law.) |
| **William K. Sutter** | February 28, 2014 | Maurice A. Deane School of Law | Hempstead, New York | Active | |
| **R. C. Bryan** | | Norman Adrian Wiggins School of Law | Raleigh, North Carolina | Active | |
| | | San Joaquin College of Law | Clovis, California | Active | |
| **Egly** | | University of La Verne College of Law | Ontario, Canada | Active | |
| **McClennan** | | William H. Bowen School of Law | Little Rock, Arkansas | Active | |
| | | Mitchell Hamline School of Law | Saint Paul, Minnesota | Active | |
| | | Northern Illinois University | DeKalb, Illinois | Active | |
| **Bernard Jeffeson** | | University of West Los Angeles School of Law | Woodland Hills, Los Angeles, California | Active | |
| **Jefferson Davis** | | University of Mississippi School of Law | Oxford, Mississippi | Active | |
| **Nathanael Greene** | | Elon University School of Law | Elon, North Carolina | Active | |
| | 2014 (rechartered) | Thomas Jefferson School of Law | San Diego, California | Active | |
