= Sigma Nu Phi =

American law fraternity (1902–1989)

- ΣΝΦ
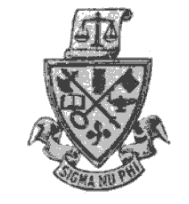
- Founded: 1902; 124 years ago National University School of Law
- Type: Professional
- Affiliation: Independent
- Status: Merged
- Merge date: 1989
- Successor: Delta Theta Phi
- Emphasis: Law
- Scope: National
- Member badge
- Colors: Purple and Gold
- Symbol: Axe and Key, Owl
- Flower: White carnation
- Jewel: Diamond and Sapphire
- Publication: The Owl; The Adelphia Law Journal
- Chapters: 10 at merger
- Members: 5,000+ lifetime
- Headquarters: Formerly, Suite 1500; 625 Fourth Avenue South; Minneapolis, Minnesota 55415; United States

Sigma Nu Phi (ΣΝΦ), also known as Adelphia Sigma Nu Phi, was a professional law fraternity and a member of the Professional Fraternity Association.

== History ==
Adelphia Sigma Nu Phi was founded in 1903 by students and faculty of National University School of Law in Washington, D.C. Its founders wanted to create a Greek letter law fraternity for men that would be a modern version of the English Order of the Coif. (Note: Not to be confused with the American Order of the Coif, formed in Chicago in 1902.) The fraternity was incorporated in the District of Columbia on February 12, 1903. Its founders and incoporators were :

- Harry Hayward Allen
- James A. Bailey
- Charles F. Carusi
- Eugene Carusi
- Oliver Metzerott
- Raymond W. Moulton
- Fred R. Reisner
- E. Richard Shipp
- Sidney F. Smith
- George L. Whitaker

Eugene Carusi was dean of the School of Law and Charles Carusi and Richard Shipp were faculty members.

The purpose of Sigma Nu Phi was to improve legal education, promote professional ethics and culture, and establish a bond of brotherhood. The fraternity selected a seal, insignia, and design for a ring in February 1903, entering these with the Librarian of Congress. Its membership was limited to students, alumni, and faculty of law schools. The fraternity's member types or degrees were apprentice, sergeant, and magistrate. Members of other fraternities were not eligible to join Sigma Nu Phi.

Soon after it was chartered, the fraternity had applications for chapters at Columbian University, Georgetown University, Indianapolis College of Law, Tulane University, the University of Kansas, and the University of Pennsylvania. It had six chapters by the end of January 1904. In May 1906, the Alpha chapter moved into its chapter house on 1016 Thirteenth Street Northwest.

Sometime after 1911, the Alpha chapter declined and went inactive. It was revived in February 1915 with the aid of faculty who were fraternity members. New members were initiated into the Alpha chapter in March. Members and alumni celebrated the chapter's revival at a function held in April 1915.

In December 1915, the Alpha chapter began discussing acquiring a new chapter house. Plans were also underway to establish chapters at Georgetown University Law School and George Washington University Law School; the former had a chapter previously that went dormant. The Washington, D.C. Alumni chapter held a joint organizational meeting on March 20, 1916.

Sigma Nu Phi was one of the chartering fraternities of the Professional Interfraternity Conference in 1928 and its president Major Jarvis Butler served as its first president.

In 1953, the fraternity had 24 chapters. However, there were only five active chapters in 1963. Sigma Nu Phi merged into Delta Theta Phi (ΔΘΦ) in 1989. Delta Theta Phi accepted all Sigma Nu Phi members and took over publishing The Adelphia Law Journal.

== Symbols ==
Sigma Nu Phi's colors were purple and gold. Its banner was made of purple and old rose silk. Its flower was the white carnation. Its jewels were the sapphire and the diamond. Its symbols were the axe, the key, and the owl.

The Sigma Nu Phi crest includes a cluster of three carnations, an Arabian lamp, an open book, and a crossed battle axe and key, flanked on both sides by an owl and surrounded by a legal scroll. The Sigma Nu Phi coat of arms was designed by Balfour and Company and adopted by the fraternity in 1921. It incorporated the symbols of the fraternity's great seal.

When it was first established, Sigma Nu Phi members wore a ring instead of a badge. It was a gold signet ring, featuring the fraternity's crest with an owl on either side. The ring had three sapphires, representing the three classes or degrees of members, and four diamonds, representing the fraternity's four declarations. A similar watch seal was also designed.

Members wore purple gowns, based on judicial robes, with an old rose and gold girdle. The right sleeve was decorated with the fraternity's crest and the left sleeve indicated the wearer's membership degree.

The fraternity's badge was a circle of purple enamel with the Greek letters ΣΝΦ above a lamp; it was encircled by pearls and featured an owl perched on an open book at the top of the circle. Before 1921, some chapters had a pin or guard that consisted of its Greek letter, surrounded in pearls, that was worn attached to the badge. However, the fraternity stated that these were forbidden in November 1921. A variant without the pearls was issued by the fraternity in 1934.

The Sigma Nu Phi pledge button was a gold owl that had jeweled eyes that was worn on the left lapel. Pledge pins were loaned to pledges and returned to the chapter after the brother's initiation. In addition, the fraternity had a recognition button that was a replica of its coat of arms. It also issued a scholarship key to the members of each chapter with the highest grade point average in their class.

In March 1915, the Alpha chapter's initiation included marching the initiates down H Street to Fourteenth Street, and onto New York Avenue in what one newspaper called "a parade in grotesque" costumes". The initiation also included a slapstick, a seizer bottle, and an electric battery.

== Publications ==
The fraternity started publishing a newspaper, The Declaration, in late February 1903. In 1916, Sigma Nu Phi started publishing The Owl magazine quarterly. It also published The Adelphia on an irregular basis starting in 1925; in 1981, it became The Adelphia Law Journal, an authoritatively recognized law review. The fraternity also published a seven members directories between 1916 and 1956.

== Chapter house ==
The original Alpha chapter house was located at 1016 Thirteenth Street Northwest. It was built in the 1870s for David Kellogg Cartter, former chief justice of the Supreme Court of the District of Columbia, and was later the home of Senator William Alexander Harris. It was three blocks from the National Law School building. Its lower level of the chapter house was decorated with hand-carved black walnut and included reading rooms, clubrooms, and space for programs and social events. The upper floors were used as a residence for students of the National University Law School.

In March 1921, Alpha chapter had a newly furnished chapter house at 1654 Columbia Road. In May 1923, it moved to a new chapter house at 1752 N Street Northwest.

== Governance ==
Chapter officers were called chancellor, first vice-chancellor, second vice-chancellor, master of rolls, registrar, and crier. Nationally, Sigma Nu Phi was governed by a high court of chancery which met annually, and an elected executive council.

Its headquarters was originally located in Washington, D.C., and later moved to Minneapolis, Minnesota.

== Chapters ==
=== Collegiate chapters ===
The Sigma Nu Phi collegiate chapters were named for distinguished lawyers, in addition to having Greek letter names. Following is a list of known collegiate chapters.

Chapter	Greek letter chapter name	Charter date and range	Institution	Location	Status	Ref.
Joseph H. Choate	Alpha	1903–1943	National University Law School	Washington, D.C.	Inactive	
		1903–before July 1916	University of Illinois College of Law	Champaign, Illinois	Inactive	
		April 1903–before July 1916	University of Indiana	Bloomington, Indiana	Inactive	
		1903–before July 1916	Tulane University	New Orleans, Louisiana	Inactive	
		1903–before July 1916	Stanford University	Stanford, California	Inactive	
John H. Reagan	Omega	1903–July 1906; May 20, 1938-1941	University of Texas	Austin, Texas	Inactive	(Note: Chapter disbanded after all but three of its members graduated.) (Note: Chapter assigned the Greek Letter Omega on rechartering)
Indiana Alpha		May 19, 1904 – before July 1916	Indianapolis College of Law	Indianapolis, Indiana	Inactive	
Charles Evans Hughes	Beta	1910–191x ?, 191x?–1941	Georgetown Law School	Washington, D.C.	Inactive	(Note: Baird's 20th edition notes this chapter formed in 1903.)
		before June 1912–before July 1916	Nashville School of Law	Nashville, Tennessee	Inactive	(Note: The 1912 Georgetown Law School yearbook says this chapter was at the University of Nashville. However, that school closed in 1909 and did not have a law school. The Nashville School of Law, which opened in 1911, is the logical host for a chapter of Sigma Nu Phi.)
		before June 1912–before July 1916, October 19, 1923 – 19xx ?	University of Wisconsin Law School	Madison, Wisconsin	Inactive	
		19xx ?–before July 1916	Butler College	Inadianapolis, Indiana	Inactive	
William Howard Taft	Gamma	May 1916–1944	Detroit College of Law	Detroit, Michigan	Inactive	
Abraham Lincoln		May 1, 1916 – before November 1921	Chicago-Kent College of Law	Chicago, Illinois	Inactive	
Nathan Green	Delta (First)	May 1, 1916 – 1940	Cumberland School of Law	Lebanon, Tennessee	Moved	
Alexander Hamilton		May 13, 1916 – before November 1921	Hamilton College of Law	Chicago, Illinois	Inactive	
Gavin W. Craig	Epsilon	February 1, 1917–1931	University of Southern California	Los Angeles, California	Inactive	
Jefferson Davis	Zeta	1921–1941	University of Richmond	Richmond, Virginia	Inactive	
John Marshall	Eta	April 30, 1921–1941	Stetson University	DeLand, Florida	Inactive	
Oliver Wendell Holmes	Theta	February 4, 1922 – 1989	American University Washington College of Law	Washington, D.C.	Merged (ΔΘΦ)	(Note: Chapter formed by absorbing Lambda Sigma Chi (local), established in 1904.)
Champ Clark	Iota	April 22, 1922 – 1932	Saint Louis University	St. Louis, Missouri	Inactive	
James G. Jenkins	Kappa	May 20, 1922 – 1946	Marquette University Law School	Milwaukee, Wisconsin	Inactive	(Note: Chapter formed from affiliation of the Wm. H. Taft Club)
Richmond Pearson	Lambda	April 4, 1923 – 1932	Duke University	Durham, North Carolina	Inactive	(Note: Chapter formed at Trinity College which changed its name to Duke University in 1925.)
Russell H. Conwell	Mu	March 31, 1923–1934	Temple University School of Law	Philadelphia, Pennsylvania	Inactive	
William D. Mitchell	Nu (First) (see Psi)	May 8, 1923–1938	Northwestern College of Law	Portland, Oregon	Reassigned	(Note: In 1938, the charter was transferred from Northwestern College of Law to St. Paul College of Law/Minneapolis College of Law.)
Stephen A. Douglas	Xi	1924–1932	Loyola University Chicago	Chicago, Illinois	Inactive	
Edward Douglas White	Omicron	January 16, 1925–1933	Loyola University New Orleans	New Orleans, Louisiana	Inactive	
John F. Shafroth	Pi	1926–1941	Westminster College of Law	Denver, Colorado	Inactive	(Note: Chapter formed at the Westminster College of Law which merged with University of Denver College of Law in 1957.)
William Marvin Simmons	Rho	1926–1955	University of California, San Francisco	San Francisco, California	Inactive	
Charles Hibbert Tupper	Sigma	1927–1931	Vancouver Law School	Vancouver, British Columbia, Canada	Inactive	
Leon P. Lewis	Tau	1927–1932	University of Louisville	Louisville, Kentucky	Inactive	
John W. Davis	Upsilon	1927–1931	Duquesne University	Pittsburgh, Pennsylvania	Inactive	
Grant Fellows	Phi	1928–1958	Detroit City Law School	Detroit, Michigan	Inactive	(Note: The Detroit City Law School was formed in 1927, as part of the College of the City of Detroit, offering evening classes. It would later consolidate as the Wayne State University Law School.)
Alexander H. Stephens	Chi	1929–1941	Atlanta Law School	Atlanta, Georgia	Inactive	
Robert S. Bean	Psi (See Nu First)	1936–1989	Northwestern College of Law	Portland, Oregon	Merged (ΔΘΦ)	
William D. Mitchell	Nu (Second)	1938–1941	Minneapolis College of Law	Minneapolis, Minnesota	Inactive	(Note: This college began a series of mergers between four Minneapolis law schools in 1940, culminating with a merger with the St. Paul College of Law to create William Mitchell College of Law in 1956.)
James Madison	Alpha Alpha	May 27, 1938–1989	University of Virginia School of Law	Charlottesville, Virginia	Merged (ΔΘΦ)	
H.A. Blackmun	Alpha Beta	1975–1989	Hamline Law School	Saint Paul, Minnesota	Merged (ΔΘΦ)	
Orville Richardson	Alpha Epsilon	1980–1989	Saint Louis University School of Law	St. Louis, Missouri	Merged (ΔΘΦ)	
Roscoe Pound	Alpha Zeta	1980–1989	University of Nebraska College of Law	Lincoln, Virginia	Merged (ΔΘΦ)	
Howard J. Munson	Alpha Eta	1980–1989	Syracuse University College of Law	Syracuse, New York	Merged (ΔΘΦ)	
Marion Griffin	Alpha Theta	1981–1989	Vanderbilt University Law School	Nashville, Tennessee	Merged (ΔΘΦ)	
Nathan Green	Delta (Second)	1982–198x ?	Cumberland School of Law, Samford University	Homewood, Alabama	Inactive	(Note: Cumberland Law School became a unit of Samford University in 1961, moving from Tennessee to Alabama.)
Allen D. Vestal		1982–1989	University of Iowa College of Law	Iowa City, Iowa	Merged (ΔΘΦ)	
Louis D. Brandeis		1982–1989	California Western School of Law	San Diego, California	Merged (ΔΘΦ)	

=== Alumni chapters ===
Following is a list of known Sigma Nu Phi alumni chapters.

Chapter	Charter date and range	Location	Status	Ref.
District of Columbia Alumni	March 20, 1916	Washington, D.C.	Inactive	
Detroit Alumni		Detroit, Michigan	Inactive	
Richmond Alumni	May 31, 1924	Richmond, Virginia	Inactive	
St. Louis Alumni		St. Louis, Missouri	Inactive	
Milwaukee Alumni		Milwaukee, Wisconsin	Inactive	
Chicago Alumni		Chicago, Illinois	Inactive	
Los Angeles Alumni		Los Angeles, California	Inactive	
Minneapolis Alumni		Minneapolis, Minnesota	Inactive	
Louisville Alumni		Louisville, Kentucky	Inactive	
Atlanta Alumni	October 13, 1934	Atlanta, Georgia	Inactive	
Portland Alumni		Portland, Oregon	Inactive	

== Notable members ==
- Richard H. Alvey (Alpha Honorary), chief judge of the Supreme Court of Maryland and chief justice of the Court of Appeals of the District of Columbia
- James M. Beck (Honorary), U.S. Solicitor General and U.S. House of Representatives
- Theodore M. Brantley (Delta First, Honorary), Chief Justice of the Montana Supreme Court
- Theodore Brentano (Alpha Honorary), attorney, judge, and U.S. ambassador to Hungary
- Joseph H. Choate (Beta Honorary), United States Ambassador to the United Kingdom
- George B. Davis (Alpha Honorary), Judge Advocate General of the United States Army
- Herbert J. Drane (Honorary), U.S. House of Representatives
- Duncan U. Fletcher (Honorary), U.S. Senator
- Melville Fuller (Alpha Honorary), Chief Justice of the U.S. Supreme Court
- George Gray (Alpha Honorary), United States Senator and a United States circuit judge
- Oliver Wendell Holmes (Alpha Honorary), U.S. Supreme Court justice
- Charles Evans Hughes (Beta Honorary), Chief Justice of the U.S. Supreme Court
- Frank E. Irvine (Alpha Honorary), federal judge and dean of Cornell Law School
- Calvin Ira Kephart, lawyer and hearing examiner with the Interstate Commerce Commission and law professor at George Washington University
- John W. Kern (Indiana Alpha), United States Senator
- Arthur J. Lacy (Gamma Honorary), attorney, judge, professor, and mayor of Clare, Michigan
- Paul Lessinoff (Honorary), Bulgarian Chargé d'affaires to the United States
- Oscar Raymond Luhring (Honorary), U.S. House of Representatives and Associate Justice of the District Court of the United States for the District of Columbia.
- David J. Mays (Zeta), lawyer and writer
- Samuel McGowan (Honorary), Rear Admiral and Paymaster General of the United States Navy
- Frank S. Monnett (Alpha Honorary), Ohio Attorney General
- Abram F. Myers (Beta), chair of the Federal Trade Commission
- Samuel J. Nicholls (Beta Honorary), U.S. House of Representatives
- Samuel W. Pennypacker (Alpha Honorary), Governor of Pennsylvania
- Theodore Roosevelt (Alpha Honorary), President of the United States
- George Shiras Jr. (Alpha Honorary), U.S. Supreme Court justice
- Frederick Lincoln Siddons (Alpha), Associate Justice of the Supreme Court of the District of Columbia
- John R. Saunders (Zeta Honorary), Attorney General of Virginia and Senate of Virginia
- William Howard Taft, President of the United States
- Hannis Taylor (Beta Honorary), United States Ambassador to Spain
- David I. Walsh (Beta Honorary), Governor of Massachusetts and United States Senate
- David K. Watson (Alpha Honorary), U.S. House of Representatives and Ohio Attorney General
- Edward Douglas White (Beta Honorary), Chief Justice of the U.S. Supreme Court
