= Thomas J. Watson Research Center =

Building in Yorktown Heights, New York

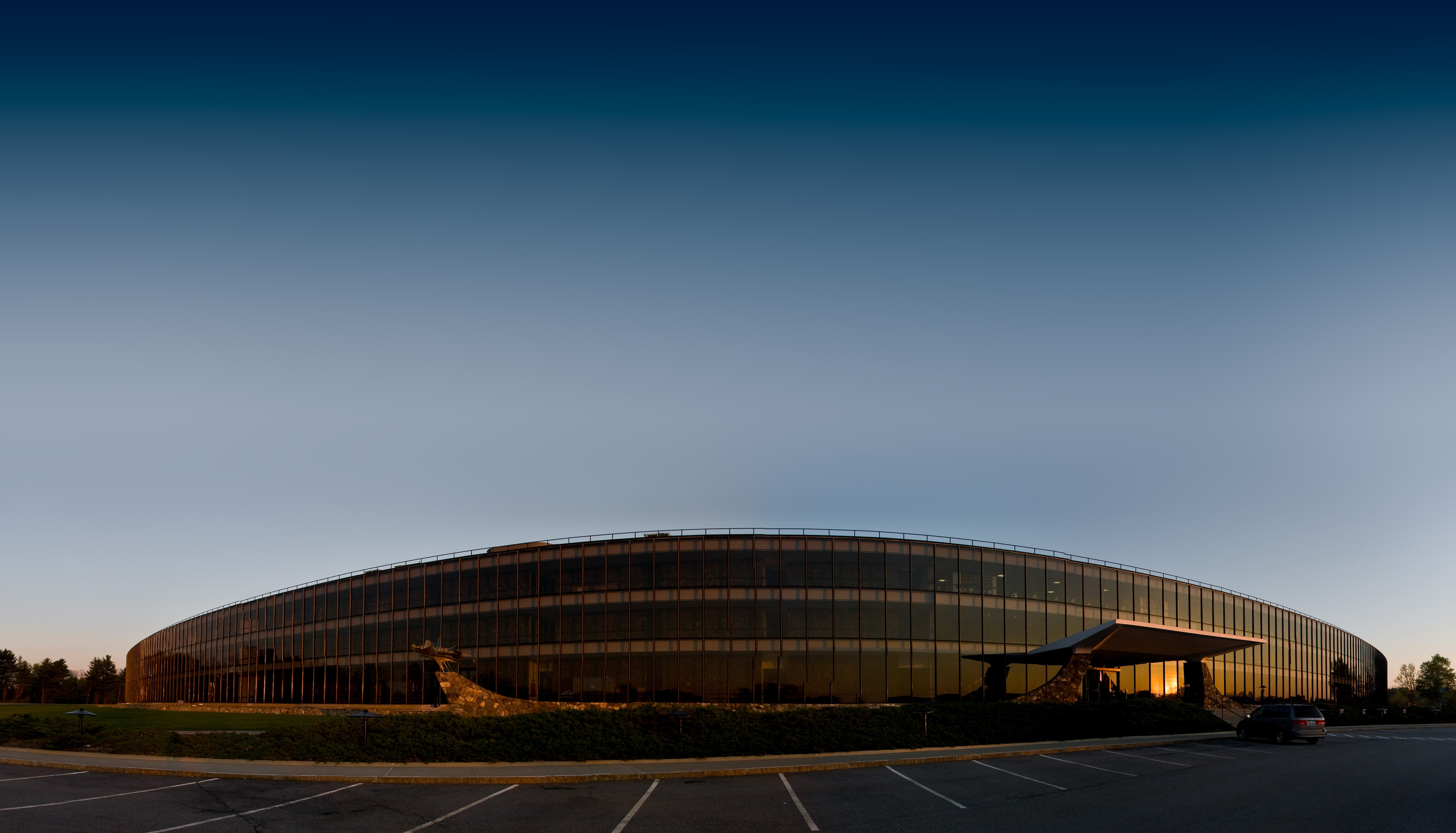
- The main laboratory building of the IBM Research Center
- Interactive map of the Thomas J. Watson Research Center area

General information
- Status: Completed
- Type: Computer science research laboratory and divisional headquarters
- Architectural style: Modernist
- Location: Kitchawan Road, Yorktown Heights, New York, U.S.
- Coordinates: 41°12′37″N 73°48′11″W
- Named for: Thomas J. Watson, Sr.; Thomas Watson, Jr.
- Year built: 1956–1961
- Owner: IBM Research

Design and construction
- Architect: Eero Saarinen

The Thomas J. Watson Research Center is the headquarters for IBM Research. Its main laboratory is in Yorktown Heights, New York, 38 miles (61 km) north of New York City. It also operates facilities in Cambridge, Massachusetts and Albany, New York.

== History ==
=== 20th century ===
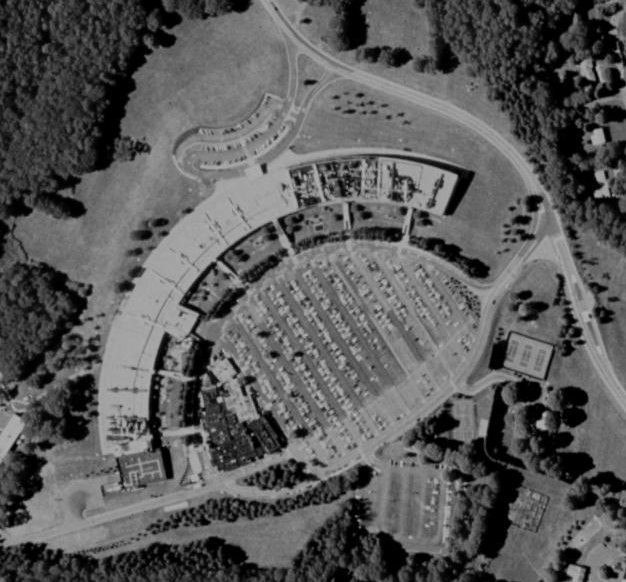
An aerial satellite view of the center's main building

The center, headquarters of IBM's Research division, is named for both Thomas J. Watson, Sr. and Thomas Watson, Jr., who led IBM as president and CEO, respectively, from 1915 when it was known as the Computing-Tabulating-Recording Company, to 1971.

The research is intended to improve hardware (physical sciences and semiconductors research), services (business modeling, consulting, and operations research), software (programming languages, security, speech recognition, data management, and collaboration tools), computer systems (operating systems and server design), and the mathematics and science that support the information technology industry.

The center was founded at Columbia University in 1945 as the Watson Scientific Computing Laboratory, on 116th Street in Manhattan, expanding to 115th Street in 1953. More labs were later opened in Westchester County, New York beginning in the late 1950s with the temporary facility and research headquarters at the former Robert S. Lamb estate in Croton-on-Hudson, New York, with others in Yorktown Heights, and downtown Ossining. The new headquarters were finally located with a new lab on Kitchawan Road in Yorktown Heights designed by architect Eero Saarinen completed in 1961, with the 115th Street site closing in 1970. IBM later donated the New York City buildings to Columbia University; they are now known as the Casa Hispanica and Watson Hall. The lab expanded to Hawthorne in 1984.

Notable staff have included the mathematicians Benoît Mandelbrot, Ralph E. Gomory, Shmuel Winograd, Alan Hoffman, Don Coppersmith, Gregory Chaitin, physicist and presidential advisor Richard Garwin, inventor Robert Dennard, roboticist Matthew T. Mason, author Clifford A. Pickover, computer scientists Frances E. Allen, John Cocke, Stuart Feldman, Ken Iverson, Irene Greif, William Pulleyblank, and Mark N. Wegman, Barry Appelman, Wietse Venema, Harry Markowitz (Economics Nobel Prize, 1990), electrical engineer Jeffrey Kephart, chemist Gábor A. Somorjai, and physicists Llewellyn Thomas, Rolf Landauer, Charles H. Bennett, Elliott H. Lieb, J. B. Gunn, Leroy Chang, Leo Esaki (Physics Nobel Prize, 1973), Jay Gambetta, Uri Sivan (president of the Technion – Israel Institute of Technology), and Zvi Galil (former president of Tel Aviv University).

=== 21st century ===
In 2009, the work done at the center from 1960 to 1984 was named an IEEE Milestone.

== Supercomputers ==
As of November 2010, the center houses three TOP500 supercomputers; the oldest and still fastest of which, a BlueGene/L system designed for protein folding simulations, called BGW (Blue Gene Watson), entered the list in the 06/2005 issue, then positioned second behind fellow Blue Gene/L in LLNL.

Another well-known installation is Watson, an artificial intelligence system capable of answering natural language questions, which won several Jeopardy! games against human contestants in February 2011 on the site, and defeated Jeopardy! super-champions Ken Jennings and Brad Rutter.

== Buildings ==
=== Yorktown Heights ===
The Yorktown Heights building, housing the headquarters of IBM Research, was designed by the architect Eero Saarinen and built in 1956–1961. Situated on private land not generally accessible to the public, it is a large crescent-shaped structure consisting of three levels with 40 aisles each, radiating out from the center of the circle described by the crescent. Due to this construction, none of the offices have windows. The lowest level is partially underground in some areas toward the shorter side of the crescent, which also leads to the employee parking lots. A large overhang protrudes from the front entryway of the building, and faces the visitor parking lot. The building houses a library, an auditorium and a cafeteria. The original building named Mohansic, for the area, was in Yorktown Heights; this building is in Yorktown proper. The Mohansic building was the temporary area for Research while the TJ Watson building was being constructed.

=== Albany NanoTech ===
The facility can be found at 257 Fuller Rd, Albany, New York; it is located in facilities owned by the State University of New York's Polytechnic Institute's Colleges of Nanoscale Science and Engineering (SUNY-CNSE) which also hosts the Center for Semiconductor Research (CSR). The IBM occupied portion of the site is the main facility of IBM Research's Semiconductor Group. The group focuses on next generation semiconductor technology research, and is the group most associated with a number of innovations related to semiconductor scaling, including the introduction of a 7 nm test chip in 2015, a 5 nm test chip in 2017. and a 2 nm test chip in 2021. This group operates an advanced extreme ultraviolet lithography enabled research line which is used to support their research both in support of and beyond traditional scaling. This work is done in a collaborative ecosystem based environment which includes academic and industrial partners.

=== Cambridge, Massachusetts ===
The Cambridge research lab can be found at 75 Binney Street in Cambridge, Massachusetts; it is located in the IBM Watson Health HQ. Research at Cambridge focuses on AI.

=== Hawthorne ===
The Hawthorne building was a leased facility located on Skyline Drive, which is part of an industrial park shared by several area businesses. In 2012 the Hawthorne lease was closed by IBM and remaining employees were relocated to the Yorktown Heights site. The Hawthorne building (located at 19 Skyline Drive) is easily recognizable by its mirrored facade and large blue pole. Located approximately 25 miles north of New York City, the Hawthorne site was smaller than its sister site at Yorktown Heights (with none of the wet lab space found in the Yorktown Heights facility). The primary focus at Hawthorne was software- and services-related research, whereas Yorktown Heights focuses on chemistry, mathematics, physics, silicon technology, and electrical engineering research, as well as some software and services. The building also contained a cafeteria, presentation center and library. The site, opened in 1984, was designed by Michael Harris Spector. The building is now part of New York Medical College.

== See also ==
- Tech companies in the New York metropolitan area
- List of works by Eero Saarinen

== Bibliography ==
- Brennan, Jean Ford (1971). The IBM Watson Laboratory at Columbia University: A History. IBM.
- Krawitz, Eleanor (November 1949). "The Watson Scientific Computing Laboratory: A Center for Scientific Research Using Calculating Machines". Columbia Engineering Quarterly.
- Grosch, Dr. Herb (2003). Computer: Bit Slices from a Life. Third Millenium Books. ISBN 0-88733-084-3. 500+ pages, including several chapters on IBM's Watson Scientific Computing Laboratory at Columbia University in the 1940s and 50s. Also available in PDF.
