= 1934 Michigan gubernatorial election =

- November 6, 1934
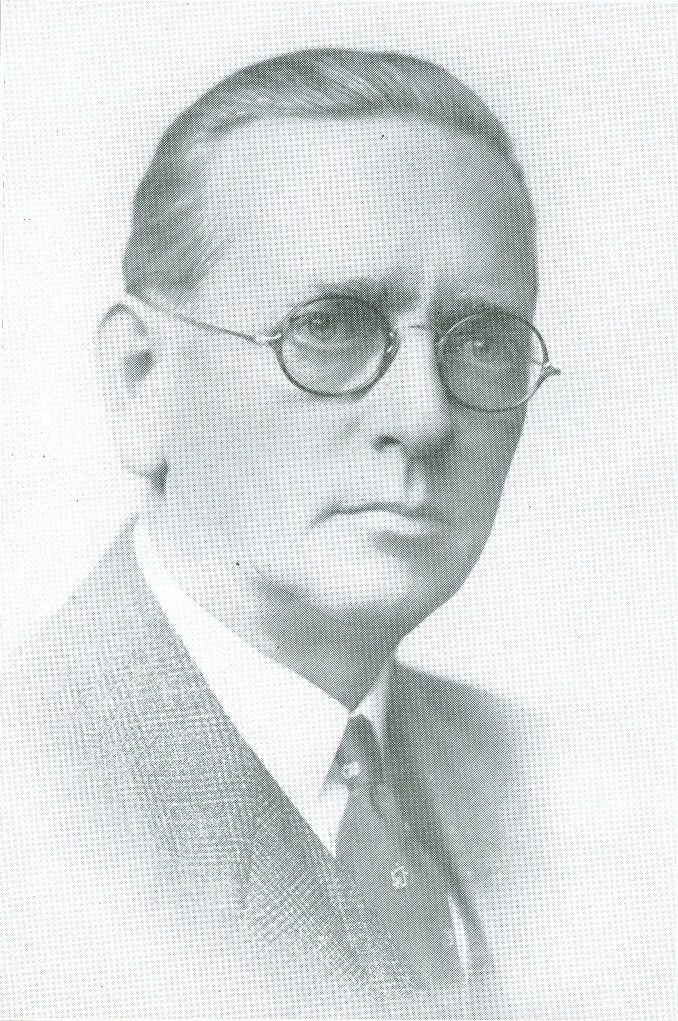

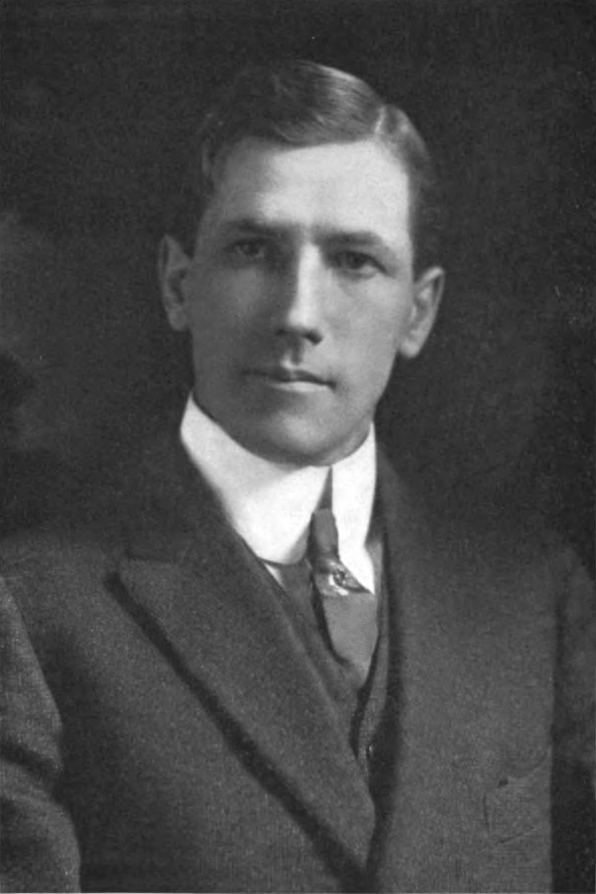
| Nominee | Frank Fitzgerald | Arthur J. Lacy |
| Party | Republican | Democratic |
| Popular vote | 659,743 | 577,044 |
| Percentage | 52.41% | 45.84% |
- County results Fitzgerald: 50–60% 60–70% 70–80% Lacy: 40–50% 50–60% 60–70%
Governor before election
William Comstock
Democratic
Elected Governor
Frank Fitzgerald
Republican

The 1934 Michigan gubernatorial election was held on November 6, 1934. Republican nominee Frank Fitzgerald defeated Democratic nominee Arthur J. Lacy with 52.41% of the vote.

== Primary election ==
Michigan held primary elections on September 11, 1934.

=== Democratic party ===
Incumbent governor William Comstock sought reelection but was defeated in the primary election by Arthur J. Lacy.

==== Candidates ====
- William Comstock, incumbent governor
- Arthur J. Lacy, former mayor of Clare
- John K. Stack Jr., Michigan Auditor General

==== Results ====
Democratic primary results
| Party | Candidate | Votes | % |
|---|---|---|---|
| Democratic | Arthur J. Lacy | 121,363 | 45.82% |
| Democratic | William Comstock (inc.) | 111,314 | 42.03% |
| Democratic | John K. Stack Jr. | 32,135 | 12.13% |
| Democratic | Scattering | 39 | 0.01% |
| Total votes | | 264,851 | 100.00% |

=== Republican party ===
Secretary of State Frank Fitzgerald defeated former governor Alex J. Groesbeck for the Republican nomination.

==== Candidates ====
- Orla A. Bailey, candidate for Republican nomination in 1932
- Frank Fitzgerald, Secretary of State of Michigan
- Alex J. Groesbeck, former governor
- John W. Smith, former mayor of Detroit

==== Results ====
Republican primary results
| Party | Candidate | Votes | % |
|---|---|---|---|
| Republican | Frank Fitzgerald | 315,827 | 63.74% |
| Republican | Alex J. Groesbeck | 151,544 | 30.58% |
| Republican | John W. Smith | 18,734 | 3.78% |
| Republican | Orla A. Bailey | 9,361 | 1.89% |
| Republican | Scattering | 22 | 0.00% |
| Total votes | | 495,488 | 100.00% |

== General election ==
=== Candidates ===
Major party candidates

- Frank Fitzgerald, Republican
- Arthur J. Lacy, Democratic

Other candidates

- Arthur E. Larsen, Socialist
- John Anderson, Communism
- Donald D. Alderdyce, Farmer–Labor
- Robert Fraser, Socialist Labor
- Lincoln E. Buell, Commonwealth
- Robert R. Pointer, People's Progressive
- Ann L. Medow, National
- Edward N. Lee, American

=== Results ===
1934 Michigan gubernatorial election
| Party | Candidate | Votes | % | ±% |
|---|---|---|---|---|
| Republican | Frank Fitzgerald | 659,743 | 52.41% | +9.29% |
| Democratic | Arthur J. Lacy | 577,044 | 45.84% | −9.09% |
| Socialist | Arthur E. Larsen | 12,002 | 0.95% | −0.29% |
| Communist | John Anderson | 5,734 | 0.46% | −0.03% |
| Farmer–Labor | Donald D. Alderdyce | 2,105 | 0.17% | |
| Socialist Labor | Robert Fraser | 1,040 | 0.08% | |
| Commonwealth | Lincoln E. Buell | 800 | 0.06% | |
| People's Progressive | Robert R. Pointer | 198 | 0.02% | |
| National | Ann L. Medow | 164 | 0.01% | |
| American | Edward N. Lee | 95 | 0.01% | |
| Majority | | 82,699 | 6.57% | |
| Total votes | | 1,258,925 | 100.00 | |
| Republican gain from Democratic | | Swing | +18.37% | |

==== Results by county ====
Gogebic County voted Democratic for the time first time ever while Iron County voted Democratic for the first time 1890.

| County | Frank Fitzgerald Republican | | Arthur J. Lacy Democratic | | Arthur E. Larsen Socialist | | John Anderson Communist | | All Others Various | | Margin | | Total votes cast |
| County | # | % | # | % | # | % | # | % | # | % | # | % | Total votes cast |
|---|---|---|---|---|---|---|---|---|---|---|---|---|---|
| Alcona | 1,165 | 59.87% | 757 | 38.90% | 23 | 1.18% | 1 | 0.05% | 0 | 0.00% | 408 | 20.97% | 1,946 |
| Alger | 1,613 | 44.18% | 1,934 | 52.97% | 19 | 0.52% | 81 | 2.22% | 4 | 0.11% | -321 | -8.79% | 3,651 |
| Allegan | 8,415 | 70.41% | 3,420 | 28.61% | 75 | 0.63% | 10 | 0.08% | 32 | 0.27% | 4,995 | 41.79% | 11,952 |
| Alpena | 3,407 | 61.43% | 2,072 | 37.36% | 59 | 1.06% | 0 | 0.00% | 8 | 0.14% | 1,335 | 24.07% | 5,546 |
| Antrim | 2,258 | 59.86% | 1,434 | 38.02% | 73 | 1.94% | 2 | 0.05% | 5 | 0.13% | 824 | 21.85% | 3,772 |
| Arenac | 1,816 | 59.60% | 1,199 | 39.35% | 18 | 0.59% | 12 | 0.39% | 2 | 0.07% | 617 | 20.25% | 3,047 |
| Baraga | 2,132 | 53.77% | 1,756 | 44.29% | 10 | 0.25% | 65 | 1.64% | 2 | 0.05% | 376 | 9.48% | 3,965 |
| Barry | 5,032 | 64.83% | 2,632 | 33.91% | 71 | 0.91% | 3 | 0.04% | 24 | 0.31% | 2,400 | 30.92% | 7,762 |
| Bay | 9,579 | 49.27% | 9,629 | 49.53% | 212 | 1.09% | 2 | 0.01% | 19 | 0.10% | -50 | -0.26% | 19,441 |
| Benzie | 1,674 | 53.91% | 1,385 | 44.61% | 34 | 1.10% | 6 | 0.19% | 6 | 0.19% | 289 | 9.31% | 3,105 |
| Berrien | 13,778 | 51.52% | 12,744 | 47.66% | 151 | 0.56% | 18 | 0.07% | 50 | 0.19% | 1,034 | 3.87% | 26,741 |
| Branch | 5,420 | 63.15% | 3,093 | 36.04% | 47 | 0.55% | 1 | 0.01% | 22 | 0.26% | 2,327 | 27.11% | 8,583 |
| Calhoun | 12,840 | 56.33% | 9,568 | 41.97% | 321 | 1.41% | 25 | 0.11% | 41 | 0.18% | 3,272 | 14.35% | 22,795 |
| Cass | 4,723 | 54.46% | 3,877 | 44.70% | 39 | 0.45% | 11 | 0.13% | 23 | 0.27% | 846 | 9.75% | 8,673 |
| Charlevoix | 2,714 | 59.57% | 1,678 | 36.83% | 144 | 3.16% | 3 | 0.07% | 17 | 0.37% | 1,036 | 22.74% | 4,556 |
| Cheboygan | 2,647 | 51.22% | 2,461 | 47.62% | 51 | 0.99% | 5 | 0.10% | 4 | 0.08% | 186 | 3.60% | 5,168 |
| Chippewa | 4,853 | 58.63% | 3,343 | 40.38% | 21 | 0.25% | 50 | 0.60% | 11 | 0.13% | 1,510 | 18.24% | 8,278 |
| Clare | 2,135 | 65.75% | 1,088 | 33.51% | 19 | 0.59% | 3 | 0.09% | 2 | 0.06% | 1,047 | 32.25% | 3,247 |
| Clinton | 4,623 | 60.56% | 2,981 | 39.05% | 22 | 0.29% | 1 | 0.01% | 7 | 0.09% | 1,642 | 21.51% | 7,634 |
| Crawford | 563 | 50.45% | 508 | 45.52% | 44 | 3.94% | 0 | 0.00% | 1 | 0.09% | 55 | 4.93% | 1,116 |
| Delta | 4,899 | 42.50% | 6,429 | 55.77% | 113 | 0.98% | 27 | 0.23% | 60 | 0.52% | -1,530 | -13.27% | 11,528 |
| Dickinson | 3,759 | 35.87% | 6,577 | 62.76% | 103 | 0.98% | 35 | 0.33% | 6 | 0.06% | -2,818 | -26.89% | 10,480 |
| Eaton | 7,140 | 63.34% | 3,888 | 34.49% | 223 | 1.98% | 1 | 0.01% | 20 | 0.18% | 3,252 | 28.85% | 11,272 |
| Emmet | 3,080 | 55.56% | 2,384 | 43.00% | 74 | 1.33% | 1 | 0.02% | 5 | 0.09% | 696 | 12.55% | 5,544 |
| Genesee | 22,242 | 49.94% | 21,740 | 48.81% | 350 | 0.79% | 90 | 0.20% | 116 | 0.26% | 502 | 1.13% | 44,538 |
| Gladwin | 1,727 | 61.07% | 1,075 | 38.01% | 9 | 0.32% | 14 | 0.50% | 3 | 0.11% | 652 | 23.06% | 2,828 |
| Gogebic | 4,572 | 43.41% | 5,703 | 54.14% | 46 | 0.44% | 187 | 1.78% | 25 | 0.24% | -1,131 | -10.74% | 10,533 |
| Grand Traverse | 3,393 | 56.37% | 2,592 | 43.06% | 25 | 0.42% | 4 | 0.07% | 5 | 0.08% | 801 | 13.31% | 6,019 |
| Gratiot | 5,174 | 58.99% | 3,473 | 39.60% | 68 | 0.78% | 7 | 0.08% | 49 | 0.56% | 1,701 | 19.39% | 8,771 |
| Hillsdale | 6,246 | 61.65% | 3,835 | 37.85% | 29 | 0.29% | 12 | 0.12% | 10 | 0.10% | 2,411 | 23.80% | 10,132 |
| Houghton | 9,581 | 50.48% | 9,147 | 48.19% | 36 | 0.19% | 204 | 1.07% | 12 | 0.06% | 434 | 2.29% | 18,980 |
| Huron | 5,703 | 61.55% | 3,343 | 36.08% | 199 | 2.15% | 7 | 0.08% | 14 | 0.15% | 2,360 | 25.47% | 9,266 |
| Ingham | 19,451 | 56.90% | 14,325 | 41.91% | 299 | 0.87% | 34 | 0.10% | 74 | 0.22% | 5,126 | 15.00% | 34,183 |
| Ionia | 6,507 | 53.42% | 5,546 | 45.53% | 73 | 0.60% | 3 | 0.02% | 51 | 0.42% | 961 | 7.89% | 12,180 |
| Iosco | 2,083 | 61.41% | 1,284 | 37.85% | 12 | 0.35% | 4 | 0.12% | 9 | 0.27% | 799 | 23.56% | 3,392 |
| Iron | 3,744 | 48.12% | 3,934 | 50.56% | 18 | 0.23% | 71 | 0.91% | 14 | 0.18% | -190 | -2.44% | 7,781 |
| Isabella | 4,294 | 58.21% | 2,988 | 40.50% | 33 | 0.45% | 8 | 0.11% | 54 | 0.73% | 1,306 | 17.70% | 7,377 |
| Jackson | 15,116 | 55.17% | 11,972 | 43.70% | 120 | 0.44% | 70 | 0.26% | 120 | 0.44% | 3,144 | 11.48% | 27,398 |
| Kalamazoo | 15,803 | 63.20% | 8,554 | 34.21% | 424 | 1.70% | 41 | 0.16% | 181 | 0.72% | 7,249 | 28.99% | 25,003 |
| Kalkaska | 861 | 59.58% | 541 | 37.44% | 40 | 2.77% | 1 | 0.07% | 2 | 0.14% | 320 | 22.15% | 1,445 |
| Kent | 32,813 | 52.80% | 28,456 | 45.79% | 455 | 0.73% | 203 | 0.33% | 222 | 0.36% | 4,357 | 7.01% | 62,149 |
| Keweenaw | 1,054 | 52.46% | 932 | 46.39% | 5 | 0.25% | 17 | 0.85% | 1 | 0.05% | 122 | 6.07% | 2,009 |
| Lake | 1,192 | 50.62% | 1,143 | 48.54% | 9 | 0.38% | 5 | 0.21% | 6 | 0.25% | 49 | 2.08% | 2,355 |
| Lapeer | 4,737 | 69.06% | 2,083 | 30.37% | 29 | 0.42% | 2 | 0.03% | 8 | 0.12% | 2,654 | 38.69% | 6,859 |
| Leelanau | 1,738 | 57.82% | 1,248 | 41.52% | 5 | 0.17% | 10 | 0.33% | 5 | 0.17% | 490 | 16.30% | 3,006 |
| Lenawee | 9,893 | 59.59% | 6,548 | 39.44% | 60 | 0.36% | 15 | 0.09% | 86 | 0.52% | 3,345 | 20.15% | 16,602 |
| Livingston | 5,080 | 59.86% | 3,322 | 39.14% | 70 | 0.82% | 3 | 0.04% | 12 | 0.14% | 1,758 | 20.71% | 8,487 |
| Luce | 1,266 | 58.64% | 871 | 40.34% | 7 | 0.32% | 9 | 0.42% | 6 | 0.28% | 395 | 18.30% | 2,159 |
| Mackinac | 2,125 | 52.69% | 1,882 | 46.67% | 22 | 0.55% | 1 | 0.02% | 3 | 0.07% | 243 | 6.03% | 4,033 |
| Macomb | 10,114 | 48.08% | 10,525 | 50.04% | 233 | 1.11% | 92 | 0.44% | 71 | 0.34% | -411 | -1.95% | 21,035 |
| Manistee | 3,582 | 50.64% | 3,371 | 47.66% | 89 | 1.26% | 20 | 0.28% | 11 | 0.16% | 211 | 2.98% | 7,073 |
| Marquette | 7,978 | 49.36% | 7,976 | 49.35% | 50 | 0.31% | 144 | 0.89% | 15 | 0.09% | 2 | 0.01% | 16,163 |
| Mason | 3,311 | 50.29% | 3,152 | 47.87% | 72 | 1.09% | 32 | 0.49% | 17 | 0.26% | 159 | 2.41% | 6,584 |
| Mecosta | 3,545 | 60.74% | 1,928 | 33.04% | 33 | 0.57% | 3 | 0.05% | 327 | 5.60% | 1,617 | 27.71% | 5,836 |
| Menominee | 3,787 | 44.30% | 4,617 | 54.01% | 124 | 1.45% | 10 | 0.12% | 10 | 0.12% | -830 | -9.71% | 8,548 |
| Midland | 3,455 | 61.63% | 2,069 | 36.91% | 40 | 0.71% | 4 | 0.07% | 38 | 0.68% | 1,386 | 24.72% | 5,606 |
| Missaukee | 1,714 | 63.11% | 982 | 36.16% | 14 | 0.52% | 1 | 0.04% | 5 | 0.18% | 732 | 26.95% | 2,716 |
| Monroe | 7,945 | 48.08% | 8,425 | 50.98% | 39 | 0.24% | 17 | 0.10% | 100 | 0.61% | -480 | -2.90% | 16,526 |
| Montcalm | 5,697 | 59.12% | 3,322 | 34.47% | 118 | 1.22% | 8 | 0.08% | 491 | 5.10% | 2,375 | 24.65% | 9,636 |
| Montmorency | 994 | 60.65% | 626 | 38.19% | 10 | 0.61% | 6 | 0.37% | 3 | 0.18% | 368 | 22.45% | 1,639 |
| Muskegon | 9,852 | 52.66% | 8,556 | 45.74% | 117 | 0.63% | 78 | 0.42% | 104 | 0.56% | 1,296 | 6.93% | 18,707 |
| Newaygo | 3,897 | 64.07% | 1,976 | 32.49% | 23 | 0.38% | 11 | 0.18% | 175 | 2.88% | 1,921 | 31.59% | 6,082 |
| Oakland | 23,954 | 53.65% | 19,943 | 44.67% | 487 | 1.09% | 135 | 0.30% | 127 | 0.28% | 4,011 | 8.98% | 44,646 |
| Oceana | 2,969 | 63.08% | 1,686 | 35.82% | 33 | 0.70% | 11 | 0.23% | 8 | 0.17% | 1,283 | 27.26% | 4,707 |
| Ogemaw | 1,683 | 58.72% | 1,158 | 40.40% | 8 | 0.28% | 2 | 0.07% | 15 | 0.52% | 525 | 18.32% | 2,866 |
| Ontonagon | 2,383 | 49.42% | 2,186 | 45.33% | 17 | 0.35% | 220 | 4.56% | 16 | 0.33% | 197 | 4.09% | 4,822 |
| Osceola | 3,407 | 64.72% | 1,825 | 34.67% | 22 | 0.42% | 0 | 0.00% | 10 | 0.19% | 1,582 | 30.05% | 5,264 |
| Oscoda | 441 | 59.04% | 300 | 40.16% | 5 | 0.67% | 0 | 0.00% | 1 | 0.13% | 141 | 18.88% | 747 |
| Otsego | 1,098 | 51.00% | 1,025 | 47.61% | 30 | 1.39% | 0 | 0.00% | 0 | 0.00% | 73 | 3.39% | 2,153 |
| Ottawa | 10,224 | 59.48% | 6,679 | 38.86% | 250 | 1.45% | 15 | 0.09% | 20 | 0.12% | 3,545 | 20.62% | 17,188 |
| Presque Isle | 1,845 | 47.93% | 1,990 | 51.70% | 10 | 0.26% | 1 | 0.03% | 3 | 0.08% | -145 | -3.77% | 3,849 |
| Roscommon | 993 | 64.27% | 537 | 34.76% | 15 | 0.97% | 0 | 0.00% | 0 | 0.00% | 456 | 29.51% | 1,545 |
| Saginaw | 16,722 | 52.71% | 14,520 | 45.77% | 272 | 0.86% | 33 | 0.10% | 180 | 0.57% | 2,202 | 6.94% | 31,727 |
| Sanilac | 5,788 | 70.19% | 2,354 | 28.55% | 93 | 1.13% | 0 | 0.00% | 11 | 0.13% | 3,434 | 41.64% | 8,246 |
| Schoolcraft | 1,640 | 50.87% | 1,544 | 47.89% | 36 | 1.12% | 0 | 0.00% | 4 | 0.12% | 96 | 2.98% | 3,224 |
| Shiawassee | 6,096 | 55.77% | 4,587 | 41.97% | 71 | 0.65% | 2 | 0.02% | 174 | 1.59% | 1,509 | 13.81% | 10,930 |
| St. Clair | 11,493 | 55.02% | 9,106 | 43.59% | 252 | 1.21% | 14 | 0.07% | 23 | 0.11% | 2,387 | 11.43% | 20,888 |
| St. Joseph | 6,437 | 62.98% | 3,675 | 35.96% | 91 | 0.89% | 4 | 0.04% | 13 | 0.13% | 2,762 | 27.03% | 10,220 |
| Tuscola | 6,223 | 68.21% | 2,851 | 31.25% | 35 | 0.38% | 4 | 0.04% | 10 | 0.11% | 3,372 | 36.96% | 9,123 |
| Van Buren | 8,734 | 62.73% | 5,039 | 36.19% | 100 | 0.72% | 18 | 0.13% | 33 | 0.24% | 3,695 | 26.54% | 13,924 |
| Washtenaw | 12,555 | 60.70% | 7,800 | 37.71% | 244 | 1.18% | 44 | 0.21% | 41 | 0.20% | 4,755 | 22.99% | 20,684 |
| Wayne | 169,242 | 45.39% | 194,830 | 52.25% | 4,521 | 1.21% | 3,415 | 0.92% | 873 | 0.23% | -25,588 | -6.86% | 372,881 |
| Wexford | 3,285 | 56.13% | 2,510 | 42.88% | 39 | 0.67% | 5 | 0.09% | 14 | 0.24% | 775 | 13.24% | 5,853 |
| Total | 659,743 | 52.41% | 577,044 | 45.84% | 12,002 | 0.95% | 5,734 | 0.46% | 4,402 | 0.35% | 82,699 | 6.57% | 1,258,925 |

===== Counties that flipped from Democratic to Republican =====
- Alpena
- Arenac
- Baraga
- Berrien
- Branch
- Calhoun
- Cass
- Cheboygan
- Clare
- Clinton
- Crawford
- Eaton
- Genesee
- Gladwin
- Grand Traverse
- Gratiot
- Ingham
- Ionia
- Isabella
- Jackson
- Kent
- Lake
- Lenawee
- Livingston
- Mackinac
- Manistee
- Mason
- Midland
- Montcalm
- Montmorency
- Muskegon
- Oakland
- Oceana
- Otsego
- Roscommon
- Saginaw
- Shiawassee
- St. Joseph

===== Counties that flipped from Republican to Democratic =====
- Gogebic
- Iron
