= Paul Lessinoff =

Paul Lessinoff (Bulgarian: Павел Лесцнов) (June 12, 1884 - March 19, 1929) served as the Bulgarian Chargé d'affaires to the United States from December 16, 1920 to August 24, 1921 and August 5, 1922 to June 1, 1925.

== Personal life ==
Lessinoff was born in Sliven, Bulgaria. He studied law, political economy, and finance in Leipzig and Munich, and graduated in 1909.

Lessinoff married Elizabeth Ellison Kennedy (formerly wife of George Yandes Wheeler) on October 17, 1923.

Lessinoff was made an honorary member of Sigma Nu Phi in 1922.

== Diplomat ==
In 1912, Lessinoff entered the Foreign Office at Sofia as an attaché and was sent to Constantinople in 1915 as Third Secretary of the Royal Bulgarian Legation.

Lessinoff joined the Washington Delegation of the Kingdom of Bulgaria as First Secretary, serving as Chargé d'affaires during the absence of ambassador Stefan Panaretov and decision of the Bulgarian Foreign Ministry to appoint his successor, Nadejda Stancioff, to a post at Bulgarian Embassy in London.
