= Arthur J. Lacy =

American politician

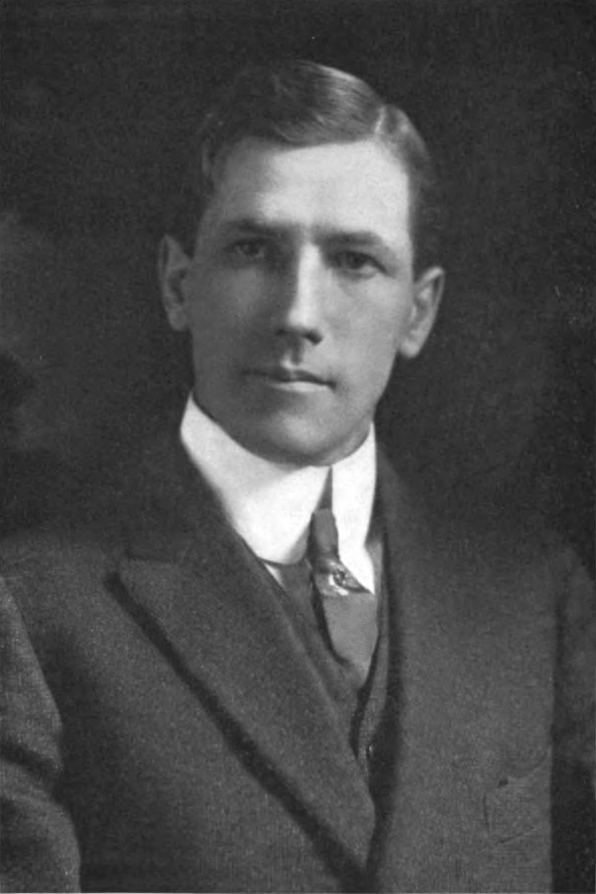

Mayor of Clare, Michigan
- In office 1902–1906

Personal details
- Born: September 30, 1876 Nirvana, Lake County, Michigan
- Died: April 6, 1975 (aged 98) Birmingham, Michigan
- Party: Democratic; Republican (later)
- Education: Northern Indiana Normal School of Law (LL.B); University of Michigan Law School (LL.B)

Arthur Jay Lacy (September 30, 1876 – April 6, 1975) was an American politician, lawyer, and philanthropist. In 1934, Lacy served as the Democratic Michigan gubernatorial nominee.

== Early life and education ==
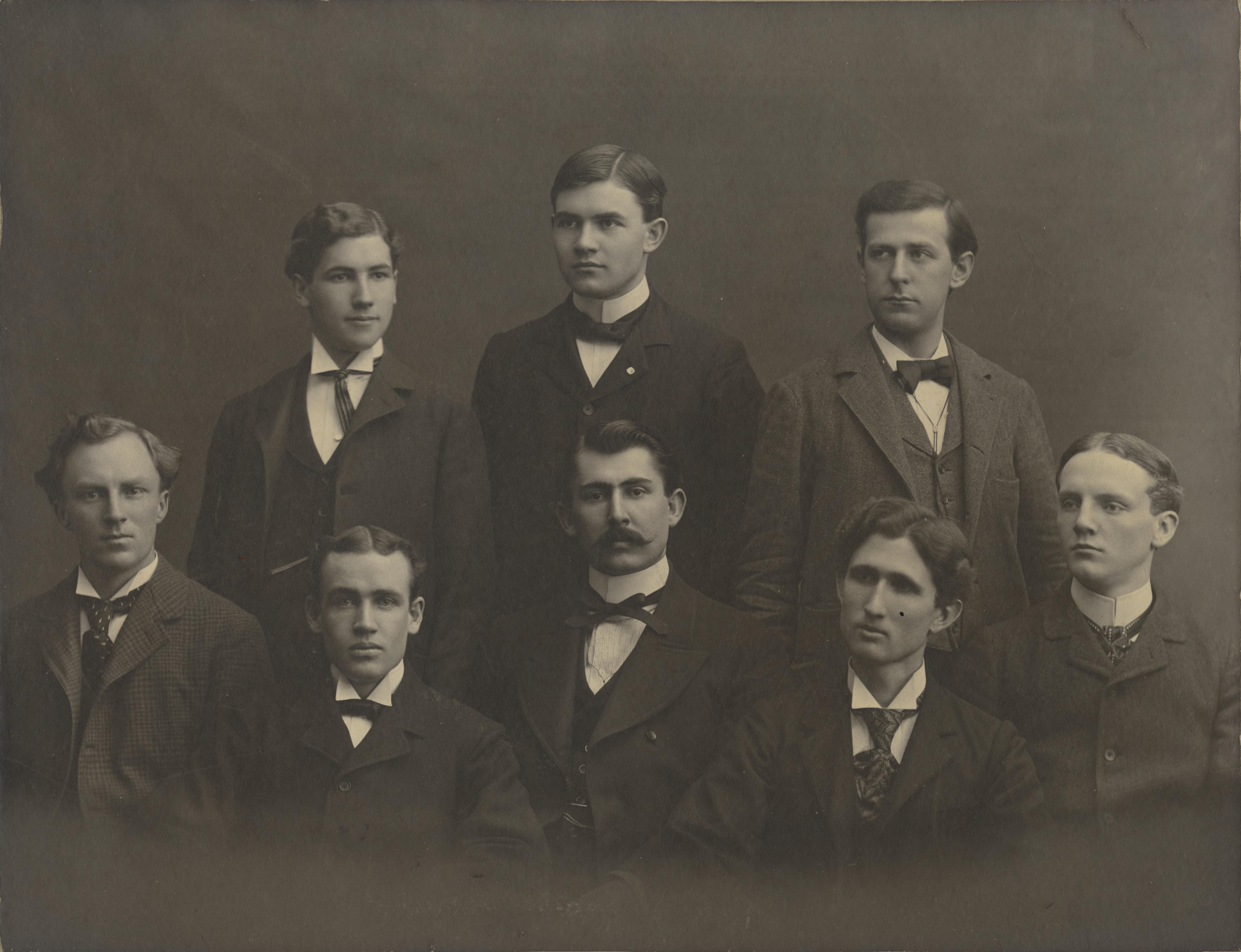
Arthur J. Lacy (leftmost, back row) with the University of Michigan Democratic Club

Arthur J. Lacy was born on September 30, 1876, in Nirvana, Lake County, Michigan, to parents Francis Daniel Lacy and Eunice Amelia Lacy. Arthur attended school until age twelve, and was also tutored at home by his father. In 1894, Arthur started to attend Northern Indiana Normal School (now known as Valparaiso University), and ended up earning an LL.B from the Northern Indiana Normal School of Law. In 1896, Arthur started attending the University of Michigan, where he again earned an LL.B in 1898.

== Career ==
In 1896, Lacy was admitted to the Indiana Bar, despite being underage, and was admitted to the Michigan Bar in 1898. In 1899, Lacy moved to Clare, Michigan, where he started his law career. He served as city attorney for Clare from 1899 to 1909. Lacy served as mayor of Clare from 1902 to 1906. In 1906, Lacy unsuccessfully ran for the United States House of Representatives seat representing the Michigan's 11th district. Lacy would also unsuccessfully run for the position of prosecuting attorney. In 1908, Lacy served as a delegate to Democratic National Convention from Michigan.

In 1909, Lacy was invited by Henry Ford's lawyer, Alfred Lucking, to practice law in Detroit. Lacy moved to Detroit in July the same year. Lacy also unsuccessfully ran for the position of University of Michigan regent in 1909. Lacy was a member of the law firm Millis, Griffin and Lacy from 1912 to 1913. In 1913, Lacy was appointed as judge of the then-new Detroit Domestic Relations Court by Michigan Governor Woodbridge N. Ferris. The court was dissolved by the Michigan Supreme Court eight months later in 1914. In 1914, Lacy joined the law firm Anderson, Rackham, and Wilcox, where he replaced former member Horace Rackham. By 1938, the firm was known as Anderson, Wilcox, Lacy and Lawson. In 1919, Lacy began serving on the Detroit Civil Service Commission. In 1920, Lacy was appointed as the head of the civil service commission by Mayor James J. Couzens. Lacy served as Couzens' personal lawyer for the rest of his life. He would serve on the civil service commission until 1923. In 1926, Lacy unsuccessfully ran in the Democratic primary for the Michigan Senate seat representing the 18th district.

In 1930, Lacy would being a personal campaign against heavy taxation and high governmental costs during the Great Depression, which would gain him prominence in the Democratic Party. Accomplishments during this campaign included assisting thirty small banks in Michigan in avoiding panics from 1932 to 1933 and co-authoring the Michigan Emergency Banking Act. In 1933, Lacy served as a delegate to the Michigan convention to ratify the 21st Amendment to the United States Constitution, where he represented the Wayne County 1st district. In 1934, Lacy was persuaded to run in the Democratic Primary for the position of Governor of Michigan. On September 11, 1934, Lacy won the primary, defeating incumbent Democratic Governor William Comstock. In the general election, on November 6, 1934, Lacy was defeated by Republican nominee Frank Fitzgerald. Lacy's political career rapidly waned after this. Lacy disagreed with many of Democratic President Franklin D. Roosevelt's policies, such as deficit spending and attempted court packing. As such, he became a Republican, but he was not accepted by the party. Lacy continued to focus on his law practice, as well as philanthropy. By 1938, Lacy was a member of the American Bar Association, the Michigan Bar Association, and the Detroit Bar Association. In 1947, Lacy became less active in his law firm. He continued to focus on income tax cases, as he was considered an expert in the field.

== Personal life ==
On November 1, 1898, Lacy married Beth Malissa Garwick. Beth died in 1970. From 1918 to 1919, he served as president of the Detroit Golf Club. Lacy was Congregationalist. Lacy was a Freemason.

== Death ==
Lacy died on April 6, 1975, in Birmingham, Michigan.

Party political offices
Preceded by William Comstock	Democratic nominee for Governor of Michigan; 1934	Succeeded by Frank Murphy
