= Delta Theta Phi =

Professional law fraternity

- ΔΘΦ
- Founded: September 15, 1900; 126 years ago Cleveland Law School
- Type: Professional
- Affiliation: PFA
- Former affiliation: PIC
- Status: Active
- Emphasis: Law
- Scope: International
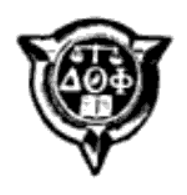
- Member badge
- Colors: Green and White
- Flower: White carnation
- Publication: The Adelphia Law Journal and The Paper Book
- Chapters: 150+
- Members: 138,000 lifetime
- Headquarters: 1611 S. Utica Avenue, #262; Tulsa, Oklahoma 74104-4909; United States
- Website: www.deltathetaphi.org

Delta Theta Phi (ΔΘΦ) is an international professional law fraternity and a member of the Professional Fraternity Association. Delta Theta Phi is the only one of the two major law fraternities to charter chapters (senates) in the United States at non-American Bar Association-approved law schools. Delta Theta Phi can trace its roots to Delta Phi Delta on September 15, 1900, at the then-named Cleveland Law School, now Cleveland-Marshall College of Law in Ohio. Delta Theta Phi has initiated more than 138,000 members across the country and in several other nations.

Delta Theta Phi is the only law fraternity with an authoritatively recognized law review, The Adelphia Law Journal. Membership is the only requirement to submit a note for consideration for publication.

== History ==
=== Predecessors ===
==== Delta Phi Delta ====
Delta Phi Delta (law) was founded at the Cleveland Law School of Baldwin University, on September 15, 1900, by C. E. Schmick, E. Quigley, F. W. Sinram, J. L. Barrett, W. F. Mackay, J. H. Orgill, and Arthur Born. It went national with the establishment of a Beta chapter (now the Harlan-McKusick Senate) at the University of South Dakota School of Law in 1904. Delta Phi Delta's Magazine was The Syllabus, first published in 1911. Delta Theta Phi now uses that name for the newsletter distributed to elected members of the administrative organization.

==== Alpha Kappa Phi ====
Alpha Kappa Phi was founded at the law school of Northwestern University on October 6, 1902. Seeking to secure the advantage of an earlier date of origin its founders took the name of an old undergraduate fraternity called Alpha Kappa Phi which originated at Centre College, Ky., in 1858 and established several chapters in the South, the last one of which at the University of Mississippi became Beta Beta chapter of Beta Theta Pi in 1879, becoming extinct a few years later. They also sought to secure some sanction for their conduct by securing permission from the living members of the extinct society to such assumption of their abandoned name. But no expedient of this kind could alter the date of the organization of this fraternity or serve as a basis for a claim to an earlier date than 1902. The fraternity became national in 1904 with the installation of the Beta chapter at Illinois College of Law (now the Warvelle Senate at DePaul University College of Law).

==== Theta Lambda Phi ====
Theta Lambda Phi was founded on February 18, 1903, at the law school of Dickinson College by Thomas S. Lanard and Walter P. Bishop. The first chapter was founded as the Holmes chapter with permission of Oliver Wendell Holmes Jr. A representative of West Publishing when visiting the law school learned of the formation of the fraternity, and the next issue of the Docket (published by West) announced the organization of Theta Lambda Phi as a new national law fraternity. Students at the Detroit College of Law, after seeing the article formed the Cooley chapter to make the fraternity national. In November 1903, Theta Lambda Phi started The Paper Book as its official form of communication. Delta Theta Phi still uses that name for its official publication mailed to all members.

=== Delta Theta Phi ===
Delta Theta Phi was established September 26, 1913, by the merger of Alpha Kappa Phi, Delta Phi Delta and Theta Lambda Phi. It became an international fraternity when chapters were established in Australia, Canada, Iceland in the late 1960s.

Delta Theta Phi merged with Sigma Nu Phi in 1989, taking all of Sigma Nu Phi members into membership and gaining The Adelphia Law Journal, giving Delta Theta Phi its own law review. The fraternity has more than 136,000 initiates. Its international headquarters are located at 1611 S. Utica Avenue in Tulsa, Oklahoma.

== Symbols ==
The name Delta Theta Phi was created by combining on letter of the fraternity's three predecessor groups: Delta Phi Delta, Theta Lambda Phi, and Alpha Kappa Phi. The Delta Theta Phi badge is a circle over a triangle. In the center of the triangle are the Greek letters "ΔΘΦ"; above the letters are the scales of justice and below is an open book. The fraternity's colors are green and white. Its flower is the white carnation.

== Governance ==
The governing body for the fraternity called the Supreme Senate, has overseen the operation of the fraternity since 1913. The Supreme Senate was originally composed of seven elected officers until a student was added to the board to ensure a more complete student representation. In the 1970s, a second student position was added.

== Chapters ==
There are more than 150 student senates or chapters of Delta Theta Phi.

== Notable members ==
Notable initiates of Delta Theta Phi Law Fraternity include four U.S. Presidents (Theodore Roosevelt, William Taft, Calvin Coolidge, and Lyndon B. Johnson), Robert Menzies, an Australian Prime Minister, nine Chief or Associate Justice of the Supreme Court of the United States, including among them Edward Douglass White Jr., Charles Evans Hughes, Oliver Wendell Holmes Jr., Harry Blackmun, John Paul Stevens, Sandra Day O’Connor, and William K. Suter, Alfred Lawrence, 1st Baron Trevethin, a Lord Chief Justice of England.
