= Jeffrey Owen Kephart =

Jeffrey Owen Kephart is an electrical engineer at the IBM T. J. Watson Research Center in Yorktown Heights, New York. Kephart was named a Fellow of the Institute of Electrical and Electronics Engineers (IEEE) in 2013 for his contributions to autonomic computing. He received his PhD in electrical engineering from Stanford University in 1987, under Richard H. Pantell.
