= Calvin Ira Kephart =

American historian

Colonel Calvin Ira Kephart LL.D. (1883–1969) was an American professor of law, genealogist, historian, expert on heraldry and amateur ethnologist.

== Career ==
Kephart by profession was a lawyer but also worked part-time for the Interstate Commerce Commission. Later he taught law as a professor at George Washington University for twelve years. He was also president of the National Genealogical Society (1928–1930, 1938–1940), and helped found the Maryland State Poetry Society. He held six degrees (law, history, and sciences) and specialized in genealogy and heraldry.

He published several pamphlets on genealogical themes, but is best remembered for his lengthy 566-page book on race entitled Races of Mankind: Their Origin and Migration.

== Works ==
Pamphlets

- The Swedes and Swedish Goths, their Origin and Migration (1938)
- Origin of Armorial Insignia in Europe (1938)
- Contributions to American History (1942)
- Origin of the name "Russia" (1944)
- Racial History of the Albanians (1944)
- Origin of the Capertian royal dynasty of France (1951)
- Odin: God of wisdom and founder of Denmark (1963)

Books

- Sanskrit. Its origin, composition and diffusion (1949)
- Origin of Heraldry in Europe (1953)
- Races of Mankind: Their Origin and Migration (1960, 2nd Ed. 1961)
- Concise History of Freemasonry: including Knight Templary (1964)
