= List of Troy Trojans football seasons =

A list of every FBS season completed by the Troy Trojans football program.

== FBS records (2001–present) ==
Year	Record	Conference	Finish	Coach	Bowl	Poll
Troy State Trojans (I-A transition) (Independent) (2001)
2001	7–4	–	–	Larry Blakeney	–	–
Troy State Trojans (Independent) (2002–2003)
2002	4–8	–	–	Larry Blakeney	–	–
2003	6–6	–	–	Larry Blakeney	–	–
Troy State Trojans (Sun Belt Conference) (2004)
2004	7–5	4–2	2nd	Larry Blakeney	Silicon Valley Bowl	–
Troy Trojans (Sun Belt Conference) (2005–Present)
2005	4–7	3–4	T-4th	Larry Blakeney	–	–
2006	8–5	6–1	T-1st	Larry Blakeney	New Orleans Bowl	–
2007	8–4	6–1	T-1st	Larry Blakeney		–
2008	8–5	7–1	1st	Larry Blakeney	New Orleans Bowl	–
2009	9–4	8–0	1st	Larry Blakeney	GMAC Bowl	–
2010	8–5	6–2	T-1st	Larry Blakeney	New Orleans Bowl	–
2011	3–9	2–6	6th	Larry Blakeney	–	–
2012	5–7	3–5	6th	Larry Blakeney	–	–
2013	6–6	4–3	T-3rd	Larry Blakeney	–	–
2014	3–9	3–5	T-7th	Larry Blakeney	–	–
2015	4–8	3–5	T-5th	Neal Brown	–	–
2016	10–3	6–2	T-3rd	Neal Brown	Dollar General Bowl	–
2017	11–2	7–1	T-1st	Neal Brown	New Orleans Bowl	–
2018	10–3	7–1	T-1st	Neal Brown	Dollar General Bowl	–
2019	5–7	3–5	7th	Chip Lindsey	–	–
2020	5–6	3–4	6th	Chip Lindsey	–	–
2021	5–7	3–5	5th	Chip Lindsey	–	–
2022	12–2	7–1	1st	Jon Sumrall	Cure Bowl	19
2023	11–3	7–1	1st	Jon Sumrall	Birmingham Bowl	–
2024	4–8	3–5	6th	Gerad Parker	–	–
All-time	163–133	101–60		5 coaches	10 Bowl Games	AP
"Poll" indicates team ranking at end of season from the Associated Press Poll. *Ranked by the AP Poll for Division I-A Football.

== Seasons (1909–2000) ==
Year	Coach	Overall	Conference	Standing	Bowl/playoffs	Coaches^{#}	AP^{°}
Virgil McKinley (Independent) (1909)
1909	Virgil McKinley	1–0–2					
Virgil McKinley:		1–0–2					
Dan Herren (Independent) (1910)
1910	Dan Herren	1–1–2					
Dan Herren:		1–1–2					
George Penton (Independent) (1911–1912)
1911	George Penton	4–1–1					
1912	George Penton	3–0					
George Penton:		7–1–1					
1913–20	No team						
J.W. Campbell (Independent) (1921–1923)
1921	J.W. Campbell	1–7					
1922	J.W. Campbell	6–4–1					
1923	J.W. Campbell	5–2					
J.W. Campbell:		12–13–1					
Ross V. Ford (Independent) (1924)
1924	Ross V. Ford	2–1–4					
Ross V. Ford:		2–1–4					
Otis Bynum (Independent) (1925–1926)
1925	Otis Bynum	5–3					
1926	Otis Bynum	7–1–1					
Otis Bynum:		12–4–1					
Gladwin Gaumer (Independent) (1927–1928)
1927	Gladwin Gaumer	5–3					
1928	Gladwin Gaumer	2–4					
Gladwin Gaumer:		7–7					
1929	No team						
1930	No coach	1–2					
Albert Elmore (Independent) (1931–1937)
1931	Albert Elmore	6–3					
1932	Albert Elmore	5–3–2					
1933	Albert Elmore	5–1					
1934	Albert Elmore	7–2					
1935	Albert Elmore	5–5					
1936	Albert Elmore	3–4					
1937	Albert Elmore	2–7–2					
Albert Elmore:		33–25–4					
Albert Choate (Alabama Intercollegiate Conference) (1938–1946)
1938	Albert Choate	4–4–1	2–0–1				
1939	Albert Choate	7–4	4–0	1st			
1940	Albert Choate	2–7	1–2				
1941	Albert Choate	5–4	3–0	1st			
1942	Albert Choate	4–3	2–0	1st			
1943–45	No team						
1946	Albert Choate	3–4	3–1				
Albert Choate:		25–26–1	15–3–1				
Fred McCollum (Alabama Intercollegiate Conference) (1947–1950)
1947	Fred McCollum	5–4–1	2–1–1				
1948	Fred McCollum	6–5	3–1		L Paper Bowl		
1949	Fred McCollum	6–3–1	2–0–1	2nd			
1950	Fred McCollum	3–6–1	1–1–1				
Fred McCollum:		20–18–3	8–3–3				
Jim Grantham (Alabama Intercollegiate Conference) (1951–1954)
1951	Jim Grantham	2–7	0–3				
1952	Jim Grantham	4–6	2–1				
1953	Jim Grantham	3–5	2–1				
1954	Jim Grantham	2–5–1	1–2				
Jim Grantham:		11–23–1	5–7				
William Clipson (Alabama Intercollegiate Conference/Alabama Collegiate Conference) (1955–1965)
1955	William Clipson	2–6	1–2				
1956	William Clipson	3–5	1–2				
1957	William Clipson	2–6	1–2				
1958	William Clipson	3–6	1–2				
1959	William Clipson	3–5	1–2				
1960	William Clipson	1–8	1–2				
1961	William Clipson	1–8	1–2				
1962	William Clipson	2–6	1–2				
1963	William Clipson	2–7	0–3				
1964	William Clipson	6–3	2–1				
1965	William Clipson	1–8	0–3				
William Clipson:		26–68	10–23				
Billy Atkins (Alabama Collegiate Conference) (1966–1969)
1966	Billy Atkins	5–5	1–2	3rd			
1967	Billy Atkins	8–2	3–0	1st			
1968	Billy Atkins	11–1	3–0	1st	W NAIA National Championship	7 (Note: AP Small college football ranking)	11 (Note: UPI Coaches Small college football ranking)
1969	Billy Atkins	8–1–1	3–0	1st			11
Billy Atkins (Mid-South Athletic Conference/Gulf South Conference) (1970–1971)
1970	Billy Atkins	6–4–1	4–1	3rd			
1971	Billy Atkins	6–3	5–1	T–1st			
Billy Atkins:		44–16–2	19–4				
Tom Jones (Gulf South Conference) (1971–1973)
1972	Tom Jones	4–5–1	2–3–1	5th			
1973	Tom Jones	7–2–1	6–1	1st			
Tom Jones:		11–7–2	8–4–1				
Byrd Whigham (Gulf South Conference) (1974–1975)
1974	Byrd Whigham	6–4	4–4	T–5th			
1975	Byrd Whigham	6–4	5–3	T–3rd			
Byrd Whigham:		12–8	9–7				
Charlie Bradshaw (Gulf South Conference) (1976–1982)
1976	Charlie Bradshaw	8–1–1	7–1	1st			6th (Note: Rankings from NCAA Division II AP poll)
1977	Charlie Bradshaw	6–4	6–2	T–2nd			
1978	Charlie Bradshaw	7–2	5–2	T–3rd			
1979	Charlie Bradshaw	6–3–1	4–1	2nd			
1980	Charlie Bradshaw	8–2	4–2	3rd			
1981	Charlie Bradshaw	3–7	1–5	6th			
1982	Charlie Bradshaw	2–8	2–5	7th			
Charlie Bradshaw:		40–27–2	29–18				
Chan Gailey (Gulf South Conference) (1983–1984)
1983	Chan Gailey	7–4	4–3	T–2nd			
1984	Chan Gailey	12–1	7–1	1st	W Palm Bowl	T–3rd (Note: Rankings from NCAA Division II Football Committee poll)	
Chan Gailey:		19–5	11–4				
Rick Rhoades (Gulf South Conference) (1985–1987)
1985	Rick Rhoades	6–4	6–2	3rd			
1986	Rick Rhoades	10–2	8–0	1st	L NCAA Division II Semifinals	3rd	
1987	Rick Rhoades	12–1–1	8–0	1st	W NCAA Division II Championship	4th	
Rick Rhoades:		28–7–1	22–2				
Robert Maddox (Gulf South Conference) (1988–1990)
1988	Robert Maddox	4–6	3–5	T–5th			
1989	Robert Maddox	4–6	3–5	T–6th			
1990	Robert Maddox	5–5	4–4	T–5th			
Robert Maddox:		13–17	10–14				
Larry Blakeney (NCAA Division II Independent) (1991–1992)
1991	Larry Blakeney	5–6					
1992	Larry Blakeney	10–1					
Larry Blakeney (NCAA Division I-AA Independent) (1993–1995)
1993	Larry Blakeney	12–1–1			L NCAA Division I-AA Semifinals	1 (Note: Rankings from The Sports Network poll)	
1994	Larry Blakeney	8–4			L NCAA Division I-AA First Round	10	
1995	Larry Blakeney	11–1			L NCAA Division I-AA First Round	3	
Larry Blakeney (Southland Football League) (1995–2000)
1996	Larry Blakeney	12–2	5–1	1st	L NCAA Division I-AA Semifinals	5	
1997	Larry Blakeney	5–6	2–5	T–6th			
1998	Larry Blakeney	8–4	5–2	T–2nd	L NCAA Division I-AA First Round	13	
1999	Larry Blakeney	11–2	6–1	T–1st	L NCAA Division I-AA Quarterfinals	6	
2000	Larry Blakeney	10–2	7–0	1st	L NCAA Division I-AA First Round	9	
Larry Blakeney:		92–29–1	25–9				
Total:		417–305–28 (.575)					
National championship Conference title Conference division title or championship game berth
