= 1955 Jacksonville State Gamecocks football team =

American college football season

1955 Jacksonville State Gamecocks football

Refrigerator Bowl champion

Refrigerator Bowl, W 12–10 vs. Rhode Island
- Conference: Alabama Intercollegiate Conference
- Record: 10–1 (2–1 AIC)
- Head coach: Don Salls (9th season)
- Home stadium: College Bowl

The 1955 Jacksonville State Gamecocks football team represented Jacksonville State Teachers College (now known as Jacksonville State University) as a member of the Alabama Intercollegiate Conference (AIC) during the 1955 college football season. Led by ninth-year head coach Don Salls, the Gamecocks compiled an overall record of 10–1 with a mark of 2–1 in conference play and a victory over Rhode Island at the Refrigerator Bowl.

== Schedule ==
| Date | Opponent | Site | Result | Attendance | Source |
|---|---|---|---|---|---|
| September 16 | at Chattanooga* | Chamberlain Field; Chattanooga, TN | W 12–0 | | |
| September 24 | Maryville (TN)* | College Bowl; Jacksonville, AL | W 7–0 | | |
| October 1 | Carson–Newman* | College Bowl; Jacksonville, AL | W 39–0 | | |
| October 8 | at Livingston State | Tiger Stadium; Livingston, AL | W 13–0 | | |
| October 15 | at Troy State | Veterans Memorial Stadium; Troy, AL (rivalry) | W 12–0 | | |
| October 22 | Austin Peay* | College Bowl; Jacksonville, AL | W 20–0 | | |
| October 29 | at South Georgia* | Douglas, GA | W 36–12 | | |
| November 5 | William Carey* | College Bowl; Jacksonville, AL | W 21–0 | | |
| November 12 | at Florence State | Municipal Stadium; Florence, AL | L 7–21 | | |
| November 19 | vs. Howard (AL)* | Mary Dumas Stadium; Talladega, AL (rivalry) | W 67–24 | | |
| December 4 | vs. Rhode Island* | Reitz Bowl; Evansville, IN (Refrigerator Bowl) | W 12–10 | 7,000 | |
*Non-conference game
