= 1965 Jacksonville State Gamecocks football team =

American college football season

1965 Jacksonville State Gamecocks football

ACC champion
- Conference: Alabama Collegiate Conference
- Record: 7–2 (3–0 ACC)
- Head coach: Jim Blevins (1st season)
- Home stadium: Paul Snow Stadium

The 1965 Jacksonville State Gamecocks football team represented Jacksonville State College (now known as Jacksonville State University) as a member of the Alabama Collegiate Conference (ACC) during the 1965 NAIA football season. Led by first-year head coach Jim Blevins, the Gamecocks compiled an overall record of 7–2 with a mark of 3–0 in conference play, and finished as ACC champion.

== Schedule ==
Date	Opponent	Site	Result	Attendance	Source
September 18	at Chattanooga*	Chamberlain Field; Chattanooga, TN	L 6–14	7,200	
September 25	Howard (AL)*	Paul Snow Stadium; Jacksonville, AL (rivalry)	W 23–3		
October 2	at Troy State	Veterans Memorial Stadium; Troy, AL (rivalry)	W 9–7	6,900	
October 9	at Southeast Missouri State*	Houck Stadium; Cape Girardeau, MO	W 24–13		
October 23	Mississippi College*	Paul Snow Stadium; Jacksonville, AL	W 20–10		
October 30	at Tampa*	Phillips Field; Tampa, FL	L 11–30		
November 6	Delta State*	Paul Snow Stadium; Jacksonville, AL	W 10–9		
November 13	at Livingston State	Tiger Stadium; Livingston, AL	W 21–14		
November 20	at Florence State	Municipal Stadium; Florence, AL	W 6–0		
*Non-conference game
