= 1958 Jacksonville State Gamecocks football team =

American college football season

1958 Jacksonville State Gamecocks football
- Conference: Alabama Intercollegiate Conference
- Record: 5–4 (2–0 AIC)
- Head coach: Don Salls (12th season)
- Home stadium: College Bowl

The 1958 Jacksonville State Gamecocks football team represented Jacksonville State College (now known as Jacksonville State University) as a member of the Alabama Intercollegiate Conference (AIC) during the 1958 NAIA football season. Led by 12th-year head coach Don Salls, the Gamecocks compiled an overall record of 5–4 with a mark of 2–0 in conference play.

== Schedule ==
Date	Opponent	Site	Result	Attendance	Source
September 13	at Louisiana College*	Alumni Stadium; Pineville, LA	L 6–26		
September 19	at Chattanooga*	Chamberlain Field; Chattanooga, TN	L 0–55		
September 27	No. T–8 Middle Tennessee*	College Bowl; Jacksonville, AL	L 6–18		
October 4	at Maryville (TN)*	Lloyd L. Thornton Stadium; Maryville, TN	W 28–8		
October 11	Troy State	College Bowl; Jacksonville, AL (rivalry)	W 20–7	3,500	
October 18	at Austin Peay*	Municipal Stadium; Clarksville, TN	W 8–6		
October 25	Livingston State	College Bowl; Jacksonville, AL	W 22–6		
November 1	Carson–Newman*	College Bowl; Jacksonville, AL	W 35–13		
November 8	at Tampa*	Phillips Field; Tampa, FL	L 6–12	2,200	
*Non-conference game; Rankings from UPI Poll released prior to the game
