= 1961 Jacksonville State Gamecocks football team =

American college football season

1961 Jacksonville State Gamecocks football
- Conference: Alabama Collegiate Conference
- Record: 5–4 (2–1 ACC)
- Head coach: Don Salls (15th season)
- Home stadium: Paul Snow Stadium

The 1961 Jacksonville State Gamecocks football team represented Jacksonville State College (now known as Jacksonville State University) as a member of the Alabama Collegiate Conference (ACC) during the 1961 NAIA football season. Led by 15th-year head coach Don Salls, the Gamecocks compiled an overall record of 5–4 with a mark of 2–1 in conference play.

== Schedule ==
Date	Opponent	Site	Result	Attendance	Source
September 16	at Chattanooga*	Chamberlain Field; Chattanooga, TN	L 7–13	8,520	
September 23	at Southeast Missouri State*	Houck Stadium; Cape Girardeau, MO	L 12–13		
September 30	Delta State*	Paul Snow Stadium; Jacksonville, AL	L 15–32	5,000	
October 7	at Troy State	Veterans Memorial Stadium; Troy, AL (rivalry)	W 22–21	2,500	
October 14	Austin Peay*	Paul Snow Stadium; Jacksonville, AL	W 21–6		
October 21	Mississippi College*	Paul Snow Stadium; Jacksonville, AL	W 21–6		
November 4	at Florence State	Municipal Stadium; Florence, AL	L 0–17		
November 11	Louisiana College*	Paul Snow Stadium; Jacksonville, AL	W 22–21		
November 18	at Livingston State	Tiger Stadium; Livingston, AL	W 9–6		
*Non-conference game
