= 1963 Jacksonville State Gamecocks football team =

American college football season

1963 Jacksonville State Gamecocks football

ACC co-champion
- Conference: Alabama Collegiate Conference
- Record: 4–4–1 (2–0–1 ACC)
- Head coach: Don Salls (17th season)
- Home stadium: Paul Snow Stadium

The 1963 Jacksonville State Gamecocks football team represented Jacksonville State College (now known as Jacksonville State University) as a member of the Alabama Collegiate Conference (ACC) during the 1963 NAIA football season. Led by 17th-year head coach Don Salls, the Gamecocks compiled an overall record of 4–4–1 with a mark of 2–0–1 in conference play, and finished as ACC co-champion.

== Schedule ==
Date	Opponent	Site	Result	Source
September 14	at Florence State	Municipal Stadium; Florence, AL	T 0–0	
September 21	at Southeast Missouri State*	Houck Stadium; Cape Girardeau, MO	L 7–10	
September 28	Delta State*	Paul Snow Stadium; Jacksonville, AL	L 6–7	
October 5	at Troy State	Veterans Memorial Stadium; Troy, AL (rivalry)	W 15–8	
October 12	Arkansas Tech*^{†}	Paul Snow Stadium; Jacksonville, AL	W 22–7	
October 19	Louisiana College*	Paul Snow Stadium; Jacksonville, AL	W 21–15	
November 2	at Chattanooga*	Chamberlain Field; Chattanooga, TN	L 0–14	
November 9	Mississippi College*	Paul Snow Stadium; Jacksonville, AL	L 6–14	
November 16	at Livingston State	Tiger Stadium; Livingston, AL	W 13–7	
*Non-conference game; ^{†}Homecoming
