= 1957 Troy State Red Wave football team =

American college football season

1957 Troy State Red Wave football
- Conference: Alabama Intercollegiate Conference
- Record: 2–6 (1–2 AIC)
- Head coach: William Clipson (3rd season)
- Home stadium: Veterans Memorial Stadium

The 1957 Troy State Red Wave football team represented Troy State Teachers College (now known as Troy University) as a member of the Alabama Intercollegiate Conference (AIC) during the 1957 NAIA football season. Led by third-year head coach William Clipson, the Red Wave compiled an overall record of 2–6, with a mark of 1–2 in conference play.

== Schedule ==
Date	Opponent	Site	Result	Attendance	Source
September 20	at Livingston State	Tiger Stadium; Livingston, AL	W 12–0		
September 28	at Tampa*	Phillips Field; Tampa, FL	L 7–53	6,000	
October 5	at Delta State*	Delta Field; Cleveland, MS	L 7–14		
October 12	Jacksonville State^{†}	Veterans Memorial Stadium; Troy, AL (rivalry)	L 0–13		
October 19	at Newberry*	Setzler Field; Newberry, SC	L 0–20	2,700	
October 26	at Austin Peay*	Municipal Stadium; Clarksville, TN	L 0–33		
November 2	Florence State	Veterans Memorial Stadium; Troy, AL	L 14–41		
November 9	Carson–Newman*	Veterans Memorial Stadium; Troy, AL	W 20–7		
*Non-conference game; ^{†}Homecoming
