= 1956 Jacksonville State Gamecocks football team =

American college football season

1956 Jacksonville State Gamecocks football
- Conference: Alabama Intercollegiate Conference
- Record: 5–3 (2–1 AIC)
- Head coach: Don Salls (10th season)
- Home stadium: College Bowl

The 1956 Jacksonville State Gamecocks football team represented Jacksonville State Teachers College (now known as Jacksonville State University) as a member of the Alabama Intercollegiate Conference (AIC) during the 1956 NAIA football season. Led by 10th-year head coach Don Salls, the Gamecocks compiled an overall record of 5–3 with a mark of 2–1 in conference play.

== Schedule ==
| Date | Opponent | Site | Result | Source |
|---|---|---|---|---|
| September 15 | Elon* | College Bowl; Jacksonville, AL | W 13–12 | |
| September 21 | at Chattanooga* | Chamberlain Field; Chattanooga, TN | L 0–26 | |
| October 6 | Livingston State | College Bowl; Jacksonville, AL | W 22–0 | |
| October 13 | Troy State | College Bowl; Jacksonville, AL (rivalry) | W 27–14 | |
| October 20 | at Austin Peay* | Municipal Stadium; Clarksville, TN | L 0–7 | |
| October 27 | South Georgia* | College Bowl; Jacksonville, AL | W 40–0 | |
| November 3 | at Maryville (TN)* | Lloyd L. Thornton Stadium; Maryville, TN | W 26–7 | |
| November 10 | at Florence State | Municipal Stadium; Florence, AL | L 14–27 | |
*Non-conference game
