= 1959 Jacksonville State Gamecocks football team =

American college football season

1959 Jacksonville State Gamecocks football

ACC co-champion
- Conference: Alabama Collegiate Conference
- Record: 6–2–1 (2–0 ACC)
- Head coach: Don Salls (13th season)
- Home stadium: College Bowl

The 1959 Jacksonville State Gamecocks football team represented Jacksonville State College (now known as Jacksonville State University) as a member of the Alabama Collegiate Conference (ACC) during the 1959 NAIA football season. Led by 13th-year head coach Don Salls, the Gamecocks compiled an overall record of 6–2–1 with a mark of 2–0 in conference play, and finished as ACC co-champion.

== Schedule ==
| Date | Opponent | Site | Result | Attendance | Source |
|---|---|---|---|---|---|
| September 12 | Louisiana College* | College Bowl; Jacksonville, AL | W 21–6 | | |
| September 18 | at Chattanooga* | Chamberlain Field; Chattanooga, TN | L 0–19 | 7,500 | |
| September 26 | at No. 10 Middle Tennessee* | Horace Jones Field; Murfreesboro, TN | L 20–21 | | |
| October 3 | East Tennessee State* | College Bowl; Jacksonville, AL | W 13–0 | | |
| October 10 | at Troy State | Veterans Memorial Stadium; Troy, AL (rivalry) | W 35–12 | 2,750 | |
| October 17 | Austin Peay* | College Bowl; Jacksonville, AL | W 15–14 | | |
| October 24 | at Livingston State | Tiger Stadium; Livingston, AL | W 26–0 | | |
| October 31 | at Carson–Newman* | Jefferson City, TN | T 0–0 | | |
| November 14 | Northeast Louisiana State* | College Bowl; Jacksonville, AL | W 27–12 | 1,500 | |
*Non-conference game; Rankings from UPI Poll released prior to the game
