= 1960 Troy State Red Wave football team =

American college football season

1960 Troy State Red Wave football
- Conference: Alabama Collegiate Conference
- Record: 1–8 (1–2 ACC)
- Head coach: William Clipson (6th season)
- Home stadium: Veterans Memorial Stadium

The 1960 Troy State Red Wave football team represented Troy State College (now known as Troy University) as a member of the Alabama Collegiate Conference (ACC) during the 1960 NAIA football season. Led by sixth-year head coach William Clipson, the Red Wave compiled an overall record of 1–8, with a mark of 1–2 in conference play.

== Schedule ==
| Date | Opponent | Site | Result | Attendance | Source |
|---|---|---|---|---|---|
| September 24 | Louisiana College* | Veterans Memorial Stadium; Troy, AL | L 0–27 | 1,500 | |
| October 1 | Livingston State | Veterans Memorial Stadium; Troy, AL | W 27–6 | 1,400 | |
| October 8 | at Jacksonville State | College Bowl; Jacksonville, AL (rivalry) | L 6–27 | 2,200 | |
| October 15 | Newberry* | Veterans Memorial Stadium; Troy, AL | L 6–34 | 1,100 | |
| October 22 | at Florence State | Braly Municipal Stadium; Florence, AL | L 0–38 | 6,000 | |
| October 29 | Austin Peay* | Veterans Memorial Stadium; Troy, AL | L 7–13 | 6,500 | |
| November 5 | at Tampa* | Phillips Field; Tampa, FL | L 7–22 | 5,000–10,000 | |
| November 12 | at Tennessee–Martin* | Martin, TN | L 8–22 | 2,500 | |
| November 18 | vs. Howard (AL)* | Cramton Bowl; Montgomery, AL | L 14–48 | 3,000–5,000 | |
*Non-conference game
