= 1952 Jacksonville State Gamecocks football team =

American college football season

1952 Jacksonville State Gamecocks football
- Conference: Alabama Intercollegiate Conference
- Record: 3–6 (0–3 AIC)
- Head coach: Don Salls (7th season)
- Home stadium: College Bowl

The 1952 Jacksonville State Gamecocks football team represented Jacksonville State Teachers College (now known as Jacksonville State University) as a member of the Alabama Intercollegiate Conference (AIC) during the 1952 college football season. Led by seventh-year head coach Don Salls, the Gamecocks compiled an overall record of 3–6 with a mark of 0–3 in conference play.

== Schedule ==
Date	Opponent	Site	Result	Source
September 20	Livingston State	College Bowl; Jacksonville, AL	L 13–20	
September 27	at Maryville (TN)*	Lloyd L. Thornton Stadium; Maryville, TN	L 7–15	
October 11	Tampa*	College Bowl; Jacksonville, AL	L 6–20	
October 18	Troy State	College Bowl; Jacksonville, AL (rivalry)	L 6–19	
October 25	at Austin Peay*	Municipal Stadium; Clarksville, TN	L 7–20	
November 1	South Georgia*	College Bowl; Jacksonville, AL	W 14–7	
November 6	West Georgia*	College Bowl; Jacksonville, AL	W 40–6	
November 15	at Florence State	Municipal Stadium; Florence, AL	L 14–41	
November 22	at Howard (AL)*	Hewitt Stadium; Trussville, AL (rivalry)	W 14–0	
*Non-conference game
