= 1956 Troy State Red Wave football team =

American college football season

1956 Troy State Red Wave football
- Conference: Alabama Intercollegiate Conference
- Record: 3–5 (1–2 AIC)
- Head coach: William Clipson (2nd season)
- Home stadium: Veterans Memorial Stadium

The 1956 Troy State Red Wave football team represented Troy State Teachers College (now known as Troy University) as a member of the Alabama Intercollegiate Conference (AIC) during the 1956 NAIA football season. Led by second-year head coach William Clipson, the Red Wave compiled an overall record of 3–5, with a mark of 1–2 in conference play.

== Schedule ==
Date	Opponent	Site	Result	Attendance	Source
September 22	Livingston State	Veterans Memorial Stadium; Troy, AL	W 21–6	2,500	
September 29	at Tampa*	Phillips Field; Tampa, FL	L 19–32		
October 6	Delta State*	Veterans Memorial Stadium; Troy, AL	L 0–19		
October 13	at Jacksonville State	College Bowl; Jacksonville, AL (rivalry)	L 14–27	8,000	
October 20	South Georgia*	Veterans Memorial Stadium; Troy, AL	W 13–2		
October 27	Austin Peay*^{†}	Veterans Memorial Stadium; Troy, AL	W 14–13	3,500	
November 3	at Florence State	Municipal Stadium; Florence, AL	L 6–27	5,000	
November 10	at Carson–Newman*	Jefferson City, TN	L 20–21		
*Non-conference game; ^{†}Homecoming
