= 1958 Troy State Red Wave football team =

American college football season

1958 Troy State Red Wave football
- Conference: Alabama Intercollegiate Conference
- Record: 3–6 (1–2 AIC)
- Head coach: William Clipson (4th season)
- Home stadium: Veterans Memorial Stadium

The 1958 Troy State Red Wave football team represented Troy State College (now known as Troy University) as a member of the Alabama Intercollegiate Conference (AIC) during the 1958 NAIA football season. Led by fourth-year head coach William Clipson, the Red Wave compiled an overall record of 3–6, with a mark of 1–2 in conference play.

== Schedule ==
Date	Opponent	Site	Result	Attendance	Source
September 20	Livingston State	Veterans Memorial Stadium; Troy, AL	W 22–6	2,000	
September 27	at Tampa*	Phillips Field; Tampa, FL	L 6–39	5,500–6,000	
October 4	Delta State*	Veterans Memorial Stadium; Troy, AL	W 16–0	2,000	
October 11	at Jacksonville State	College Bowl; Jacksonville, AL (rivalry)	L 7–20	3,500	
October 18	Newberry*^{†}	Veterans Memorial Stadium; Troy, AL	L 14–28	4,500–5,000	
October 25	at Florence State	Municipal Stadium; Florence, AL	L 14–20	4,700–5,000	
November 1	Austin Peay*	Veterans Memorial Stadium; Troy, AL	L 10–12	795	
November 8	at Carson–Newman*	Jefferson City, TN	L 7–13	289	
November 15	vs. Howard (AL)*	Municipal Stadium; Andalusia, AL	W 33–12	2,200	
*Non-conference game; ^{†}Homecoming
