= 1954 Jacksonville State Gamecocks football team =

American college football season

1954 Jacksonville State Gamecocks football
- Conference: Alabama Intercollegiate Conference
- Record: 7–2–1 (2–1 AIC)
- Head coach: Don Salls (8th season)
- Home stadium: College Bowl

The 1954 Jacksonville State Gamecocks football team represented Jacksonville State Teachers College (now known as Jacksonville State University) as a member of the Alabama Intercollegiate Conference (AIC) during the 1954 college football season. Led by eighth-year head coach Don Salls, the Gamecocks compiled an overall record of 7–2–1 with a mark of 2–1 in conference play.

== Schedule ==
| Date | Opponent | Site | Result | Source |
|---|---|---|---|---|
| September 17 | at Chattanooga* | Chamberlain Field; Chattanooga, TN | L 0–24 | |
| September 25 | at Maryville (TN)* | Lloyd L. Thornton Stadium; Maryville, TN | W 14–0 | |
| October 2 | at Carson–Newman* | Jefferson City, TN | W 7–0 | |
| October 9 | Livingston State | College Bowl; Jacksonville, AL | W 46–0 | |
| October 16 | Troy State | College Bowl; Jacksonville, AL (rivalry) | W 38–7 | |
| October 23 | at Austin Peay* | Municipal Stadium; Clarksville, TN | T 14–14 | |
| October 30 | South Georgia* | College Bowl; Jacksonville, AL | W 63–12 | |
| November 5 | at West Georgia* | College Bowl; Jacksonville, AL | W 37–0 | |
| November 13 | at Florence State | Municipal Stadium; Florence, AL | L 0–21 | |
| November 20 | at Howard (AL)* | Berry Field; Birmingham, AL (rivalry) | W 32–0 | |
*Non-conference game
