= 1962 Troy State Red Wave football team =

American college football season

1962 Troy State Red Wave football
- Conference: Alabama Collegiate Conference
- Record: 2–6 (1–2 ACC)
- Head coach: William Clipson (8th season)
- Home stadium: Veterans Memorial Stadium

The 1962 Troy State Red Wave football team represented Troy State College (now known as Troy University) as a member of the Alabama Collegiate Conference (ACC) during the 1962 NAIA football season. Led by eighth-year head coach William Clipson, the Red Wave compiled an overall record of 2–6, with a mark of 1–2 in conference play.

== Schedule ==
Date	Opponent	Site	Result	Attendance	Source
September 22	Louisiana College*	Veterans Memorial Stadium; Troy, AL	L 6–28	3,500	
September 29	Livingston State	Veterans Memorial Stadium; Troy, AL	W 38–14	2,800	
October 6	at Jacksonville State	Paul Snow Stadium; Jacksonville, AL (rivalry)	L 14–21	5,500	
October 13	Delta State*	Veterans Memorial Stadium; Troy, AL	L 0–30	4,500	
October 20	at Florence State	Braly Municipal Stadium; Florence, AL	L 6–27	5,300	
November 3	at Tampa*	Phillips Field; Tampa, FL	L 3–30	6,000–7,000	
November 10	at Tennessee–Martin*	Martin, TN	L 6–27	1,800	
November 17	Presbyterian*^{†}	Veterans Memorial Stadium; Troy, AL	W 13–0	4,750	
*Non-conference game; ^{†}Homecoming
