= 1957 Jacksonville State Gamecocks football team =

American college football season

1957 Jacksonville State Gamecocks football

AIC co-champion
- Conference: Alabama Intercollegiate Conference
- Record: 4–4 (2–0 AIC)
- Head coach: Don Salls (11th season)
- Home stadium: College Bowl

The 1957 Jacksonville State Gamecocks football team represented Jacksonville State College (now known as Jacksonville State University) as a member of the Alabama Intercollegiate Conference (AIC) during the 1957 NAIA football season. Led by 11th-year head coach Don Salls, the Gamecocks compiled an overall record of 4–4 with a mark of 2–0 in conference play.

== Schedule ==
Date	Opponent	Site	Result	Source
September 20	at Chattanooga*	Chamberlain Field; Chattanooga, TN	L 7–15	
September 28	at Middle Tennessee*	Horace Jones Field; Murfreesboro, TN	L 0–25	
October 5	Maryville (TN)*	College Bowl; Jacksonville, AL	W 20–0	
October 12	at Troy State	Veterans Memorial Stadium; Troy, AL (rivalry)	W 13–0	
October 19	Austin Peay*	College Bowl; Jacksonville, AL	W 20–0	
October 26	at Livingston State	Tiger Stadium; Livingston, AL	W 19–7	
November 2	at Carson–Newman*	Jefferson City, TN	L 0–28	
November 9	Tampa*	College Bowl; Jacksonville, AL	L 13–14	
*Non-conference game
