= 1959 Troy State Red Wave football team =

American college football season

1959 Troy State Red Wave football
- Conference: Alabama Collegiate Conference
- Record: 3–5 (1–2 ACC)
- Head coach: William Clipson (5th season)
- Home stadium: Veterans Memorial Stadium

The 1959 Troy State Red Wave football team represented Troy State College (now known as Troy University) as a member of the Alabama Collegiate Conference (ACC) during the 1959 NAIA football season. Led by fifth-year head coach William Clipson, the Red Wave compiled an overall record of 3–5, with a mark of 1–2 in conference play.

== Schedule ==
Date	Opponent	Site	Result	Attendance	Source
September 19	vs. Livingston State	Monroeville, AL	W 7–6	3,000	
September 26	at Tampa*	Phillips Field; Tampa, FL	L 15–35	4,500–6,500	
October 10	Jacksonville State^{†}	Veterans Memorial Stadium; Troy, AL (rivalry)	L 12–35	2,750	
October 17	at Newberry*	Setzler Field; Newberry, SC	L 6–33	2,000	
October 24	Florence State	Veterans Memorial Stadium; Troy, AL	L 14–34	756	
October 31	at Austin Peay*	Municipal Stadium; Clarksville, TN	W 13–7	2,300	
November 7	Carson–Newman*	Veterans Memorial Stadium; Troy, AL	W 21–0	400	
November 14	vs. Howard (AL)*	Municipal Stadium; Andalusia, AL	L 19–20	2,955	
*Non-conference game; ^{†}Homecoming
