= 1952 Troy State Red Wave football team =

American college football season

1952 Troy State Red Wave football
- Conference: Alabama Intercollegiate Conference
- Record: 4–6 (2–1 AIC)
- Head coach: Jim Grantham (2nd season)
- Home stadium: Veterans Memorial Stadium

The 1952 Troy State Red Wave football team represented Troy State Teachers College (now known as Troy University) as a member of the Alabama Intercollegiate Conference (AIC) during the 1952 college football season. Led by second-year head coach Jim Grantham, the Red Wave compiled an overall record of 4–6, with a mark of 2–1 in conference play.

== Schedule ==
Date	Opponent	Site	Result	Attendance	Source
September 20	vs. Tampa*	Memorial Stadium; Columbus, GA	L 0–7	6,000	
September 27	vs. Howard (AL)*	Andalusia Municipal Stadium; Andalusia, AL	W 25–16	4,500	
October 4	at Southwestern Louisiana*	McNaspy Stadium; Lafayette, LA	L 14–54		
October 11	at Middle Tennessee*	Horace Jones Field; Murfreesboro, TN (rivalry)	L 7–33		
October 18	at Jacksonville State	College Bowl; Jacksonville, AL (rivalry)	W 19–6		
October 25	at Florence State	Municipal Stadium; Florence, AL	L 6–29		
November 1	West Georgia*^{†}	Veterans Memorial Stadium; Troy, AL	W 44–7	1,200	
November 8	Austin Peay*	Veterans Memorial Stadium; Troy, AL	L 7–26		
November 15	Livingston State	Veterans Memorial Stadium; Troy, AL	W 25–13		
November 22	at Stetson*	DeLand Municipal Stadium; DeLand, FL	L 14–32		
*Non-conference game; ^{†}Homecoming
