= 1963 Troy State Red Wave football team =

American college football season

1963 Troy State Red Wave football
- Conference: Alabama Collegiate Conference
- Record: 2–7 (0–3 ACC)
- Head coach: William Clipson (9th season)
- Home stadium: Veterans Memorial Stadium

The 1963 Troy State Red Wave football team represented Troy State College (now known as Troy University) as a member of the Alabama Collegiate Conference (ACC) during the 1963 NAIA football season. Led by ninth-year head coach William Clipson, the Red Wave compiled an overall record of 2–7, with a mark of 0–3 in conference play.

== Schedule ==
Date	Opponent	Site	Result	Attendance	Source
September 21	at Louisiana College*	Alumni Stadium; Pineville, LA	W 15–14		
September 28	at Livingston State	Tiger Stadium; Livingston, AL	L 0–3	2,000	
October 5	Jacksonville State^{†}	Veterans Memorial Stadium; Troy, AL (rivalry)	L 8–15		
October 12	at Delta State*	Delta Field; Cleveland, MS	L 13–47		
October 19	Florence State	Veterans Memorial Stadium; Troy, AL	L 7–8		
October 26	at Mississippi College*	Robinson Field; Clinton, MS	L 0–6		
November 2	Tampa*	Veterans Memorial Stadium; Troy, AL	W 7–0	1,000	
November 9	Tennessee–Martin*	Veterans Memorial Stadium; Troy, AL	L 0–7		
November 16	at Presbyterian*	Bailey Stadium; Clinton, SC	L 14–24	4,500	
*Non-conference game; ^{†}Homecoming
