= 1964 Jacksonville State Gamecocks football team =

American college football season

1964 Jacksonville State Gamecocks football

ACC champion
- Conference: Alabama Collegiate Conference
- Record: 4–4–1 (3–0 ACC)
- Head coach: Don Salls (18th season)
- Defensive coordinator: Jim Blevins (1st season)
- Home stadium: Paul Snow Stadium

The 1964 Jacksonville State Gamecocks football team represented Jacksonville State College (now known as Jacksonville State University) as a member of the Alabama Collegiate Conference (ACC) during the 1964 NAIA football season. Led by 18th-year head coach Don Salls, the Gamecocks compiled an overall record of 4–4–1 with a mark of 3–0 in conference play, and finished as ACC champion. At the conclusion of the season, Salls retired and defensive coordinator Jim Blevins was promoted as his successor as head coach of the Gamecocks.

== Schedule ==
Date	Opponent	Site	Result	Attendance	Source
September 12	Tampa*	Paul Snow Stadium; Jacksonville, AL	W 10–8		
September 26	at Delta State*	Delta Field; Cleveland, MS	L 0–13		
October 3	Troy State^{†}	Paul Snow Stadium; Jacksonville, AL (rivalry)	W 38–0	8,000–10,000	
October 10	Southeast Missouri State*	Paul Snow Stadium; Jacksonville, AL	L 0–24		
October 17	at Louisiana College*	Alumni Stadium; Pineville, LA	L 9–41		
October 31	at Chattanooga*	Chamberlain Field; Chattanooga, TN	L 0–21		
November 7	at Mississippi College*	Robinson Field; Clinton, MS	T 24–24		
November 14	Livingston State	Paul Snow Stadium; Jacksonville, AL	W 40–7		
November 21	Florence State	Paul Snow Stadium; Jacksonville, AL	W 28–0		
*Non-conference game; ^{†}Homecoming
