= 1961 Troy State Red Wave football team =

American college football season

1961 Troy State Red Wave football
- Conference: Alabama Collegiate Conference
- Record: 1–8 (1–2 ACC)
- Head coach: William Clipson (7th season)
- Home stadium: Veterans Memorial Stadium

The 1961 Troy State Red Wave football team represented Troy State College (now known as Troy University) as a member of the Alabama Collegiate Conference (ACC) during the 1961 NAIA football season. Led by seventh-year head coach William Clipson, the Red Wave compiled an overall record of 1–8, with a mark of 1–2 in conference play.

== Schedule ==
| Date | Opponent | Site | Result | Attendance | Source |
|---|---|---|---|---|---|
| September 23 | at Louisiana College* | Alumni Stadium; Pineville, LA | L 0–39 | 5,000 | |
| September 30 | at Livingston State | Tiger Stadium; Livingston, AL | W 7–0 | 2,000 | |
| October 7 | Jacksonville State | Veterans Memorial Stadium; Troy, AL (rivalry) | L 21–22 | 2,500 | |
| October 14 | at Delta State* | Delta Field; Cleveland, MS | L 0–48 | 3,000–4,000 | |
| October 21 | Florence State | Veterans Memorial Stadium; Troy, AL | L 8–14 | 4,060 | |
| October 28 | at Austin Peay* | Municipal Stadium; Clarksville, TN | L 6–21 | 6,500 | |
| November 4 | Tampa* | Veterans Memorial Stadium; Troy, AL | L 6–27 | 3,000–3,640 | |
| November 11 | Tennessee–Martin* | Veterans Memorial Stadium; Troy, AL | L 8–22 | 4,200 | |
| November 18 | Howard (AL)* | Veterans Memorial Stadium; Troy, AL | L 0–80 | 5,000 | |
*Non-conference game
