= 1964 Troy State Red Wave football team =

American college football season

1964 Troy State Red Wave football
- Conference: Alabama Collegiate Conference
- Record: 6–3 (2–1 ACC)
- Head coach: William Clipson (10th season)
- Home stadium: Veterans Memorial Stadium

The 1964 Troy State Red Wave football team represented Troy State College (now known as Troy University) as a member of the Alabama Collegiate Conference (ACC) during the 1964 NAIA football season. Led by tenth-year head coach William Clipson, the Red Wave compiled an overall record of 6–3, with a mark of 2–1 in conference play.

== Schedule ==
Date	Opponent	Site	Result	Attendance	Source
September 19	at Howard (AL)*	Seibert Stadium; Homewood, AL	L 13–33	8,000	
September 26	Livingston State	Veterans Memorial Stadium; Troy, AL	W 8–0	5,000	
October 3	at Jacksonville State	Paul Snow Stadium; Jacksonville, AL (rivalry)	L 0–38	8,000–10,000	
October 10	Delta State*	Veterans Memorial Stadium; Troy, AL	W 12–0	5,600	
October 17	Mississippi College*	Veterans Memorial Stadium; Troy, AL	W 21–19	4,900	
October 24	at Florence State	Braly Municipal Stadium; Florence, AL	W 21–7	8,000	
October 31	Presbyterian*	Veterans Memorial Stadium; Troy, AL	W 9–7	4,900	
November 7	at Tennessee–Martin*	Pacer Stadium; Martin, TN	L 9–12	2,000	
November 14	at Louisiana College*	Alumni Stadium; Pineville, LA	W 33–6	2,000	
*Non-conference game
