= 1965 Troy State Red Wave football team =

American college football season

1965 Troy State Red Wave football
- Conference: Alabama Collegiate Conference
- Record: 1–8 (0–3 ACC)
- Head coach: William Clipson (11th season)
- Home stadium: Veterans Memorial Stadium

The 1965 Troy State Red Wave football team represented Troy State College (now known as Troy University) as a member of the Alabama Collegiate Conference (ACC) during the 1965 NAIA football season. Led by eleventh-year head coach William Clipson, the Red Wave compiled an overall record of 1–8, with a mark of 0–3 in conference play.

== Schedule ==
Date	Opponent	Site	Result	Attendance	Source
September 18	Howard (AL)*	Veterans Memorial Stadium; Troy, AL	L 6–37	4,200	
September 25	at Livingston State	Tiger Stadium; Livingston, AL	L 3–46	2,800	
October 2	Jacksonville State	Veterans Memorial Stadium; Troy, AL (rivalry)	L 7–9	6,900	
October 9	at Delta State*	Delta Field; Cleveland, MS	L 0–26	4,000	
October 16	at Mississippi College*	Robinson Field; Clinton, MS	L 15–35	4,000–4,200	
October 23	Florence State^{†}	Veterans Memorial Stadium; Troy, AL	L 16–25	6,500	
October 30	at Presbyterian*	Johnson Field; Clinton, SC	L 0–21	4,000	
November 6	Tennessee–Martin*	Veterans Memorial Stadium; Troy, AL	L 6–20		
November 13	Louisiana College*	Veterans Memorial Stadium; Troy, AL	W 10–7		
*Non-conference game; ^{†}Homecoming
