= 1960 Jacksonville State Gamecocks football team =

American college football season

1960 Jacksonville State Gamecocks football
- Conference: Alabama Collegiate Conference
- Record: 3–6 (2–1 ACC)
- Head coach: Don Salls (14th season)
- Home stadium: College Bowl

The 1960 Jacksonville State Gamecocks football team represented Jacksonville State College (now known as Jacksonville State University) as a member of the Alabama Collegiate Conference (ACC) during the 1960 NAIA football season. Led by 14th-year head coach Don Salls, the Gamecocks compiled an overall record of 3–6 with a mark of 2–1 in conference play.

== Schedule ==
Date	Opponent	Site	Result	Attendance	Source
September 16	at Chattanooga*	Chamberlain Field; Chattanooga, TN	L 0–35	1,500	
September 24	Middle Tennessee*	College Bowl; Jacksonville, AL	W 19–0		
October 1	at East Tennessee State*	College Stadium; Johnson City, TN	L 14–20		
October 8	Troy State	College Bowl; Jacksonville, AL (rivalry)	W 27–6	2,200	
October 15	at Austin Peay*	Municipal Stadium; Clarksville, TN	L 8–14		
October 22	Livingston State	College Bowl; Jacksonville, AL	W 20–6		
October 29	Carson–Newman*	College Bowl; Jacksonville, AL	L 0–7		
November 5	Florence State	College Bowl; Jacksonville, AL	L 7–14		
November 12	at Northeast Louisiana State*	Brown Stadium; Monroe, LA	L 0–35		
*Non-conference game
