= 1955 Troy State Red Wave football team =

American college football season

1955 Troy State Red Wave football
- Conference: Alabama Intercollegiate Conference
- Record: 2–6 (1–2 AIC)
- Head coach: William Clipson (1st season)
- Home stadium: Veterans Memorial Stadium

The 1955 Troy State Red Wave football team represented Troy State Teachers College (now known as Troy University) as a member of the Alabama Intercollegiate Conference (AIC) during the 1955 college football season. Led by first-year head coach William Clipson, the Red Wave compiled an overall record of 2–6, with a mark of 1–2 in conference play.

== Schedule ==
Date	Opponent	Site	Result	Attendance	Source
September 24	vs. Livingston State	Memorial Park; Demopolis, AL	W 25–6		
October 1	at Tampa*	Phillips Field; Tampa, FL	L 0–38		
October 7	at Stetson*	DeLand Municipal Stadium; DeLand, FL	L 0–7	4,000	
October 15	Jacksonville State	Veterans Memorial Stadium; Troy, AL (rivalry)	L 0–12		
October 22	South Georgia*	Veterans Memorial Stadium; Troy, AL	W 26–7		
October 29	William Carey*	Veterans Memorial Stadium; Troy, AL	L 0–33		
November 5	Florence State	Veterans Memorial Stadium; Troy, AL	L 7–30		
November 12	at Delta State*	Delta Field; Cleveland, MS	L 7–28		
*Non-conference game
