= 1962 Jacksonville State Gamecocks football team =

American college football season

1962 Jacksonville State Gamecocks football

ACC co-champion
- Conference: Alabama Collegiate Conference
- Record: 4–3–2 (2–0–1 ACC)
- Head coach: Don Salls (16th season)
- Home stadium: Paul Snow Stadium

The 1962 Jacksonville State Gamecocks football team represented Jacksonville State College (now known as Jacksonville State University) as a member of the Alabama Collegiate Conference (ACC) during the 1962 NAIA football season. Led by 16th-year head coach Don Salls, the Gamecocks compiled an overall record of 4–3–2 with a mark of 2–0–1 in conference play, and finished as ACC co-champion.

== Schedule ==
Date	Opponent	Site	Result	Attendance	Source
September 15	Florence State	Paul Snow Stadium; Jacksonville, AL	T 7–7		
September 22	Southeast Missouri State*	Paul Snow Stadium; Jacksonville, AL	W 6–0		
September 29	at Delta State*	Delta Field; Cleveland, MS	L 13–41		
October 6	Troy State	Paul Snow Stadium; Jacksonville, AL (rivalry)	W 21–14	5,500	
October 13	at Arkansas Tech*	Russellville, AR	T 7–7		
October 20	at Mississippi College*	Robinson Field; Clinton, MS	L 0–28		
October 27	at Austin Peay*	Municipal Stadium; Clarksville, TN	W 23–13		
November 10	at Louisiana College*	Alumni Stadium; Pineville, LA	L 7–8		
November 17	Livingston State	Paul Snow Stadium; Jacksonville, AL	W 33–7		
*Non-conference game
