= Jim Blevins =

American football player and coach (1934–2000)

Biographical details
- Born: 1934; Moulton, Alabama, U.S.
- Died: January 10, 2000 (aged 65–66); Huntsville, Alabama, U.S.

Playing career
- 1956–1959: Alabama
- Position: Tackle

Coaching career (HC unless noted)
- 1960–1961: Lawrence County (AL) H.S. (assistant)
- 1962–1963: Alabama (LB)
- 1964: Jacksonville State (DC)
- 1965–1968: Jacksonville State
- 1969–1971: UTEP (assistant)

Head coaching record
- Overall: 22–15–1

Accomplishments and honors

Championships
- 2 Alabama Collegiate Conference (1965, 1966)

Jim Blevins (1934 – January 10, 2000) was an American college football player and coach. He served as the head football coach at Jacksonville State University from 1965 to 1968, compiling a record of 22–15–1. Blevins also served as an assistant coach at Lawrence County High School, Alabama, and UTEP.

== Early life ==
A native of Moulton, Alabama, Blevins lettered in football, basketball, and baseball while attending Lawrence County High School. Upon graduation, he served three years in the United States Army before enrolling at the University of Alabama. While at Alabama Blevins played tackle for the Crimson Tide where he lettered in 1957 under head coach Jennings B. Whitworth and in both 1958 and 1959 under Bear Bryant. For the 1959 season, Blevins was selected as a team captain and played his final game as part of Bryant's first bowl game at Alabama in the 1959 Liberty Bowl.

== Coaching career ==
After graduation from Alabama, Blevins returned to Moulton and served as an assiatant coach at his high school alma mater, Lawrence County for the 1960 and 1961 seasons. He then returned to Alabama where he served as linebackers coach on Bryant's staff for their 1962 and 1963 seasons. In 1964, Blevins was hired by Jacksonville State to serve as their defensive coordinator. After only one season with the Gamecocks, he was elevated to head coach in November 1964 after Don Salls resigned from the position. During his four-year tenure as head coach at Jacksonville State, Blevins had an overall record of 22–15–1 and won a pair of Alabama Collegiate Conference championships. After his resignation from Jacksonville State in November 1968, Blevins coached for three more years as a defensive assiatant at UTEP through his resignation from the Miners in November 1971.

== Head coaching record ==
Year	Team	Overall	Conference	Standing	Bowl/playoffs
Jacksonville State Gamecocks (Alabama Collegiate Conference) (1965–1968)
1965	Jacksonville State	7–2	3–0	1st	
1966	Jacksonville State	8–2	3–0	1st	W Space City Classic
1967	Jacksonville State	4–5–1	1–1–1	2nd	
1968	Jacksonville State	3–6	0–3	4th	
Jacksonville State:		22–15–1	7–4–1		
Total:		22–15–1			
National championship Conference title Conference division title or championship game berth
