= Football at the 1997 Jeux de la Francophonie =

1997 Football at the Jeux de la Francophonie
Tournament details
- Host country: Madagascar
- City: Antananarivo
- Dates: 28 August - 6 September
- Teams: 10 (from 3 confederations)
- Venue: 1 (in 1 host city)

Final positions
- Champions: Canada (2nd title)
- Runners-up: Congo
- Third place: Cameroon
- Fourth place: Madagascar

Tournament statistics
- Matches played: 16
- Goals scored: 41 (2.56 per match)
- All statistics correct as of 20 July 2010.

Each nation brought their under-20 teams to compete in a group and knockout tournament. The top teams and the best second placed team advanced to the knockout stage of the competition. Canada won the tournament after a penalty shootout with Congo.

== Group stage ==
=== Group A ===
Team	Pld	W	D	L	GF	GA	GD	Pts
Congo	3	1	2	0	3	1	+2	5
Canada	3	1	1	1	2	2	0	4
Niger	3	1	1	1	3	4	−1	4
Benin	3	1	0	2	3	4	−1	3

Canada	2 – 0	Niger
Clarke 65'; Johnson 75'

Niger	2 – 1	Benin

Canada	0 – 0	Congo

Congo	1 – 1	Niger

Benin	2 – 0	Canada

Congo	2 – 0	Benin

=== Group B ===
Team	Pld	W	D	L	GF	GA	GD	Pts
Cameroon	2	2	0	0	5	2	+3	6
France	2	1	0	1	3	4	−1	3
Seychelles	2	0	0	2	2	4	−2	0

Cameroon	3 – 1	France

France	2 – 1	Seychelles

Cameroon	2 – 1	Seychelles

=== Group C ===
Team	Pld	W	D	L	GF	GA	GD	Pts
Madagascar	2	2	0	0	5	1	+4	6
Gabon	2	1	0	1	2	3	−1	3
Mauritius	2	0	0	2	2	5	−3	0

Madagascar	3 – 1	Mauritius

Gabon	2 – 1	Mauritius

Madagascar	2 – 0	Gabon

== Knockout stage ==
Semi-finals
-
Canada	1
Cameroon	0
-
Congo	4
Madagascar	3

Final
-
Canada	0 (5)
Congo	0 (3)
Third place
-
Cameroon	2
Madagascar	1

== See also ==
- Football at the Jeux de la Francophonie
