= William Clipson =

American football and basketball coach (1920–1996)

Biographical details
- Born: December 30, 1920
- Died: June 25, 1996 (aged 75); Tuscaloosa, Alabama, U.S.
- Education: Alabama (Ed.D.)

Coaching career (HC unless noted)

Football
- c. 1942–1951: Troy HS (AL)
- 1955–1965: Troy State

Basketball
- 1952–1955: Florida Southern

Head coaching record
- Overall: 26–68 (college football); 22–45 (college basketball); 44–26–5 (high school football)

William Floyd Clipson (December 30, 1920 – June 25, 1996) was an American football and basketball coach. He served as the head football coach at Troy State University—now known as Troy University—in Troy, Alabama from 1955 to 1965, compiling a record of 26–68. Clipson was the head basketball coach at Florida Southern College from 1952 to 1955, tallying a mark of 22–45. Clipson died on June 25, 1996, at his home in Tuscaloosa, Alabama.

== Head coaching record ==
=== College football ===
Year	Team	Overall	Conference	Standing	Bowl/playoffs
Troy State Trojans (Alabama Intercollegiate Conference Alabama Collegiate Conference) (1955–1965)
1955	Troy State	2–6	1–2		
1956	Troy State	3–5	1–2		
1957	Troy State	2–6	1–2		
1958	Troy State	3–6	1–2		
1959	Troy State	3–5	1–2		
1960	Troy State	1–8	1–2		
1961	Troy State	1–8	1–2		
1962	Troy State	2–6	1–2		
1963	Troy State	2–7	0–3		
1964	Troy State	6–3	2–1		
1965	Troy State	1–8	0–3		
Troy State:		26–68	10–23		
Total:		26–68			
