= Danley =

Danley is both a surname and a given name. Notable people with the name include:

- Christian Danley, American artist, animator, actor, and playwright
- Christopher C. Danley (1818–1865), American soldier, journalist and politician
- Frank Danley (1921–1965), American racing driver
- Kerwin Danley (born 1961), American baseball umpire
- Tom Danley (born 1952), American engineer and inventor
- Danley Jean Jacques (born 2000), Haitian footballer
- Danley Johnson (born 1978), Canadian soccer player
- Dillan Danley, Worldwide musician, clothes designer, and movie producer

== See also ==
- Danley Covered Bridge, bridge in West Finley, Pennsylvania
- Danleys Crossroads, Alabama
