= 1997 Jeux de la Francophonie =

International sports competition in Antananarivo, Madagascar

IIIèmes Jeux de la Francophonie
- Host city: Antananarivo, Madagascar
- Nations: 30
- Athletes: 2,300
- Opening: August 27, 1997
- Closing: September 6, 1997
- Opened by: Didier Ratsiraka
- Main venue: Mahamasina Municipal Stadium

The 1997 Jeux de la Francophonie (Malagasy: Lalao Frankofonia 1997), also known as III^{es} Jeux de la Francophonie, (French for Francophone Games) were held in Antananarivo, Madagascar from August 27 to September 6, 1997.

== Events ==
=== Sports ===
Sport	Gender	Results
Athletics (Track and field)	men and women	details
Basketball	women	details
Boxing	men	details
Football (soccer)	men	details
Judo	men + women	details
Tennis	women	details

=== Cultural ===
Painting
Photography
Poetry
Sculpture
Song
Traditional inspiration dance
Storytelling

== Medals and participation ==
=== Total ===
* Host nation (Madagascar)

Rank	Nation	Gold	Silver	Bronze	Total
1	France (FRA)	23	23	15	61
2	Madagascar (MAD)*	15	6	15	36
3	Canada (CAN)	10	14	13	37
4	(Wallonia) French Community of Belgium	5	3	4	12
5	Senegal (SEN)	5	1	6	12
6	Romania (ROU)	4	2	2	8
7	Cameroon (CMR)	3	4	8	15
8	Tunisia (TUN)	3	3	6	12
9	Ivory Coast (CIV)	3	2	4	9
10	Quebec	2	2	6	10
11	Burundi (BDI)	2	2	1	5
12	Mauritius (MRI)	1	7	6	14
13	Gabon (GAB)	1	3	7	11
14	Seychelles (SEY)	1	1	2	4
15	New Brunswick	1	0	5	6
16	Guinea (GUI)	1	0	0	1
17	Lebanon (LIB)	0	2	1	3
18	Congo (COG)	0	1	0	1
18	Luxembourg (LUX)	0	1	0	1
18	Niger (NIG)	0	1	0	1
21	Burkina Faso (BFA)	0	0	2	2
21	Central African Republic (CAF)	0	0	2	2
23	Cape Verde (CPV)	0	0	1	1
Totals (23 entries)		80	78	106	264

The following participation nations didn't win any medal.

Benin Chad Comoros Democratic Republic of the Congo Dominica Guinea-Bissau	Haiti Mali Morocco Mauritania Moldova Monaco	Poland Rwanda Saint Lucia Togo Vietnam
