= Don Salls =

American football player and coach (1919–2021)

Biographical details
- Born: June 24, 1919; Trenton, New Jersey, U.S.
- Died: January 2, 2021 (aged 101)

Playing career
- 1940–1942: Alabama
- Positions: Fullback, linebacker

Coaching career (HC unless noted)
- 1946–1952: Jacksonville State
- 1954–1964: Jacksonville State

Head coaching record
- Overall: 95–57–11
- Bowls: 3–1

Accomplishments and honors

Championships
- 7 AIC/ACC (1947–1948, 1957, 1959, 1962–1964)

Donald J. Salls (June 24, 1919 – January 2, 2021) was an American college football player and coach. He served as the head football coach at Jacksonville State University from 1946 to 1952 and from 1954 to 1964. He was a World War II veteran and a Purple Heart recipient. He died in January 2021 at the age of 101.

== Head coaching record ==
Year	Team	Overall	Conference	Standing	Bowl/playoffs
Jacksonville State Gamecocks (Alabama Intercollegiate Conference) (1946–1952, 1954–1958)
1946	Jacksonville State	3–5–1	1–1–1	3rd	
1947	Jacksonville State	9–0	3–0	1st	
1948	Jacksonville State	8–1–1	4–0	1st	W Paper Bowl
1949	Jacksonville State	6–3	3–2	3rd	W Paper Bowl
1950	Jacksonville State	6–2–1	2–1		L Paper Bowl
1951	Jacksonville State	3–3–2	2–0		
1952	Jacksonville State	3–6	0–3		
1954	Jacksonville State	7–2–1	2–1		
1955	Jacksonville State	10–1	2–1		W Refrigerator Bowl
1956	Jacksonville State	5–3	2–1		
1957	Jacksonville State	4–4	2–0	T–1st	
1958	Jacksonville State	5–4	2–0		
Jacksonville State Gamecocks (Alabama Collegiate Conference) (1959–1964)
1959	Jacksonville State	6–2–1	2–0	T–1st	
1960	Jacksonville State	3–6	2–1		
1961	Jacksonville State	5–4	2–1		
1962	Jacksonville State	4–3–2	2–0–1	T–1st	
1963	Jacksonville State	4–4–1	2–0–1	T–1st	
1964	Jacksonville State	4–4–1	3–0	1st	
Jacksonville State:		95–57–11	38–12–2		
Total:		95–57–11			
National championship Conference title Conference division title or championship game berth
