= Danley Johnson =

Canadian former soccer player (born 1978)

Personal information
- Full name: Danley Johnson
- Date of birth: 2 August 1978 (age 48)
- Place of birth: Toronto, Ontario, Canada
- Position: Forward

Senior career*
Years	Team	Apps	(Gls)
1997–1998	Toronto Lynx	22	(1)
2001	Toronto Olympians		

International career
1994	Canada U17	6	(3)
- * Club domestic league appearances and goals

Danley Johnson (born August 2, 1978) is a Canadian former soccer player who played in the USL A-League, and the Canadian Professional Soccer League.

== Playing career ==
Johnson played in the Ontario Soccer League in 1996 with Soccer Academy. In 1997, he began his professional career in 1997, with expansion franchise Toronto Lynx of the USL A-League. He assisted the club in qualifying for the post season for the first time in the franchise's history by finishing 4th in the Northeastern division. The Lynx were eliminated in the first round of the playoffs against the Montreal Impact. He returned to the Lynx the following year where he appeared in 9 matches, He scored his first goal for the club on May 8, 1998 in a match against Worcester Wildfire. Unfortunately the organization failed to make the post season by finishing second last in their division.

In 2001, he signed with the Toronto Olympians of the Canadian Professional Soccer League, re-uniting with former Toronto Lynx general manager David Gee. He helped the club reach the postseason by finishing second in the overall standings, but were eliminated in the semi-finals.

== International career ==
Johnson played with the Canada men's national under-17 soccer team, and made his debut on November 2, 1994 against Nicaragua at the 1994 CONCACAF U-17 Tournament. In total he made six appearances and recorded three goals. In 1997, he was called by Bruce Twamley to the Canada men's national under-20 soccer team camp in British Columbia. He was selected for the Canada U20 team that won the gold medal in the 1997 Jeux de la Francophonie.
