= Lloyd L. Thornton Stadium =

Sports venue in Maryville, Tennessee

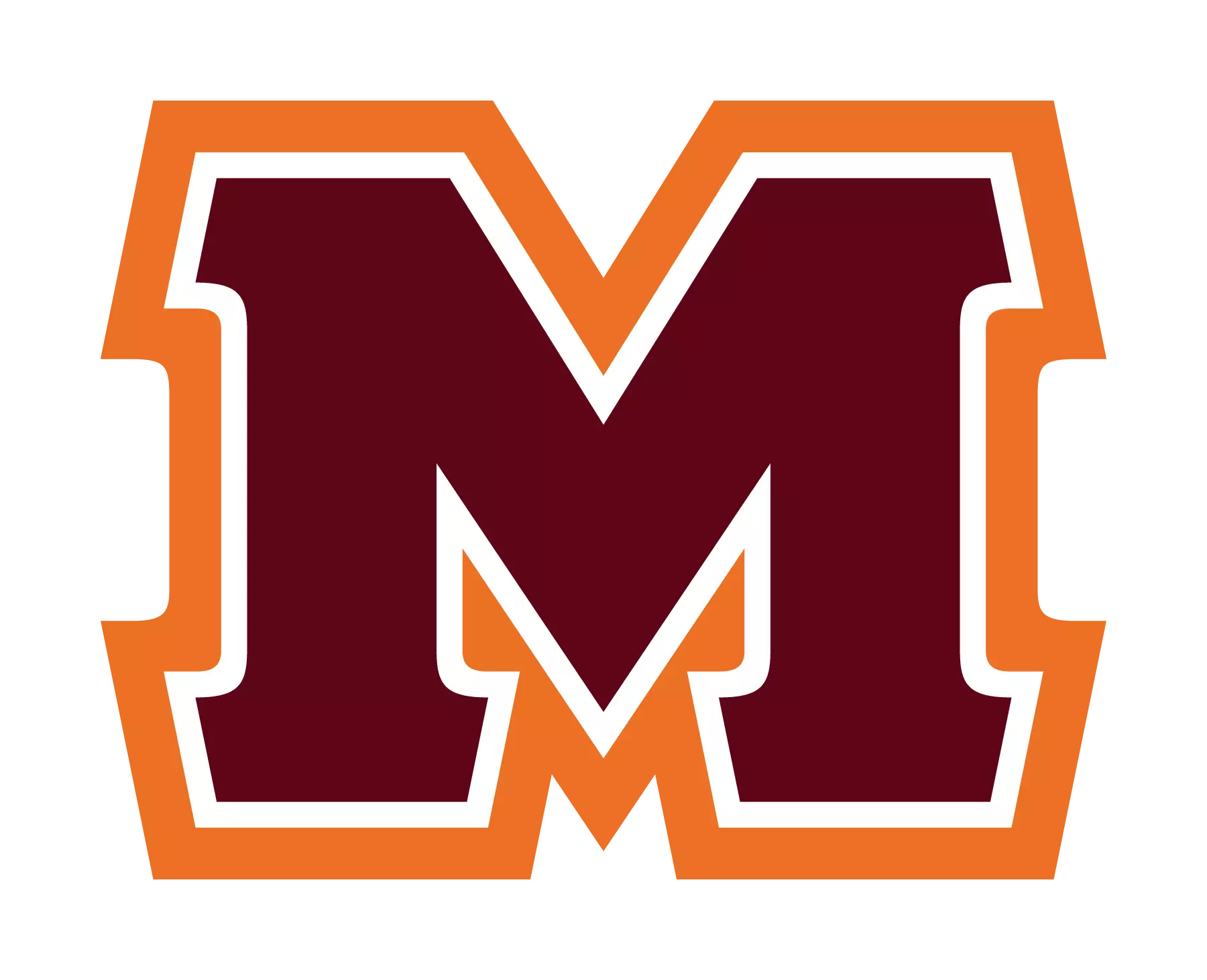
- Interactive map of Lloyd L. Thornton Stadium
- Full name: Honaker Field at Lloyd L. Thornton Stadium
- Address: 502 E. Lamar Alexander Pkwy. Maryville, TN; USA
- Coordinates: 35.7490°N 83.9638°W
- Owner: Maryville College
- Operator: Maryville College
- Capacity: 3,000
- Surface: Bermuda turf

Tenant
- Maryville Scots (NCAA) (1952–present)

Website
- mcscots.com/lloyd-thorton-stadium

The Lloyd L. Thornton Stadium is located in Maryville, Tennessee, and serves as the home stadium for the Maryville College Fighting Scots’ football team. The stadium has a maximum seating capacity of 3,000, and the field is called Honaker Field. The stadium was dedicated in 1993. The field itself was named after Maryville College's Coach Lombe Honaker, and it has been the Fighting Scots' home field since 1952.
