= Phillips Field (Florida) =

Stadium in Tampa, Florida, US

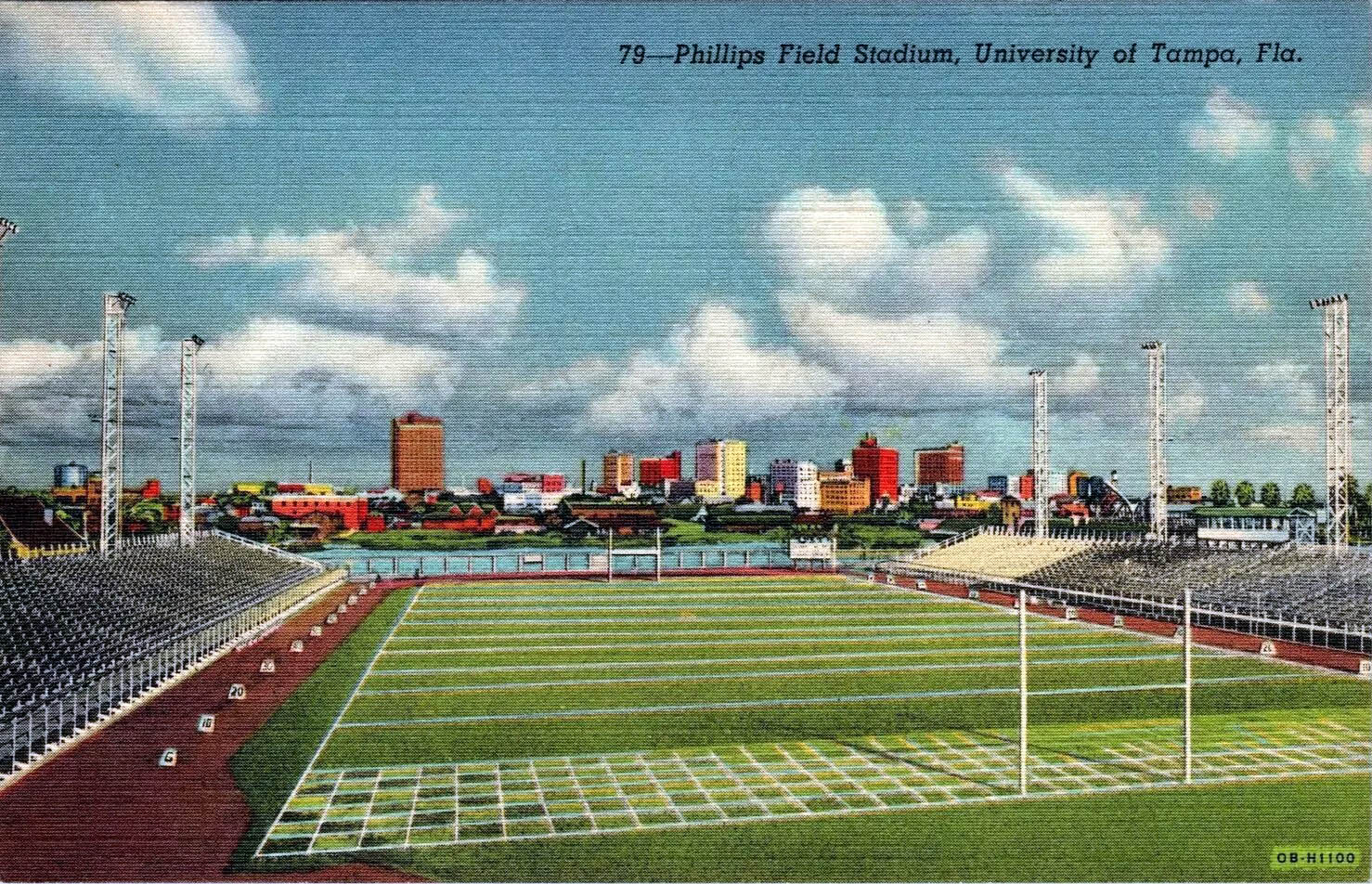
- View of the stadium in a postcard c. 1954
- Interactive map of Phillips Field
- Location: Tampa, Florida, U.S.
- Coordinates: 27.951144°N 82.467106°W
- Owner: University of Tampa (1937–1967)
- Capacity: 20,000
- Surface: Grass ringed by asphalt track

Construction
- Opened: October 4, 1937
- Closed: 1967; 59 years ago

Tenants
- Tampa Spartans football (1937–67); Cigar Bowl (1946–54)

Phillips Field was a medium-sized stadium (maximum capacity approximately 20,000) located on the west bank of the Hillsborough River across from downtown Tampa, immediately adjacent to the University of Tampa. It opened on October 4, 1937 and was the home field of the University of Tampa Spartans football program from 1937 to 1967. The facility was named for local businessman I. W. Phillips, who donated the land to the school so that the Spartans would not have to share nearby Plant Field, which was often unavailable due to its use for many different sports and community events.

== Overview ==
Though it was expressly built for Spartans football, Phillips Field nevertheless played host to other college football contests. It was the site of the Cigar Bowl, the area's first college bowl game, which was played from 1946 to 1954. The Florida Gators scheduled several home games at the facility during the 1930s and 1940s, and the Bethune-Cookman Wildcats also played several home games there in the 1950s and 1960s.

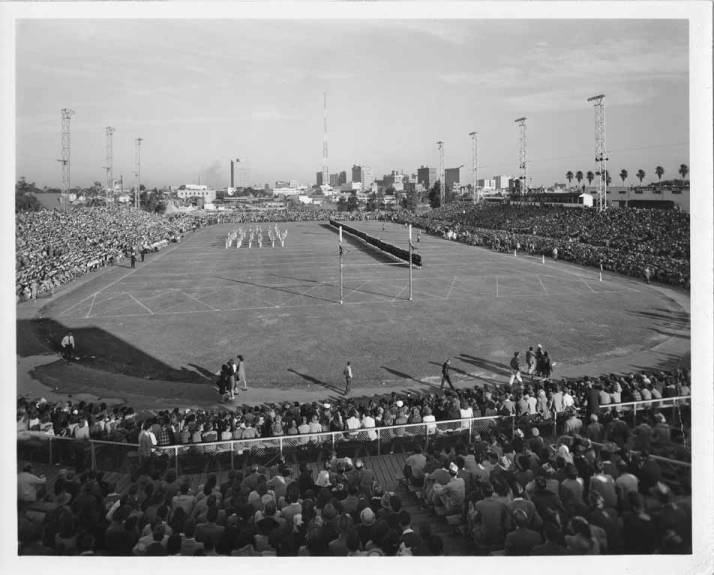
A high school game at Phillips Field in 1947

At the high school level, Middleton High School and Blake High School, two segregated local schools, shared Phillips Field for home games and ended their seasons there with a well-attended rivalry game. Hillsborough High School and Plant High School also played their annual rivalry at the site because neither schools' regular stadium could accommodate the large crowds that attended the game.

At the professional level, Phillips Field was used by various local semi-pro football squads and hosted barnstorming and other exhibition games, including several NFL preseason contests in the mid-1960s that helped Tampa earn an eventual expansion franchise.

Besides football, the field hosted stock car racing, boxing matches, and other sporting and community activities, though most such events were held at nearby Plant Field, which boasted a much larger playing surface.

When Tampa Stadium was completed in 1967, the University of Tampa acquired Plant Field from the city of Tampa and Phillips Field fell into disuse. The land was sold and the stadium razed in the early 1970s, and Tampa Preparatory School and Julian Lane Park were built at its former location.
