= Tiger Stadium (West Alabama) =

Stadium in Livingston, Alabama

Coordinates: 32.58882°N 88.18841°W

Tiger Stadium is a 7,000-capacity stadium located in Livingston, Alabama. It is home to the University of West Alabama West Alabama Tigers football team.

The stadium was built in 1952 to fill the need for an on-campus stadium - until 1952 the Tigers played home games at Livingston High School. It is built on a patch of land known as Crawdad Creek.
