= Veterans Memorial Stadium (Troy University) =

Stadium in Alabama, USA

Veterans Memorial Stadium, Larry Blakeney Field
- "The Vet"
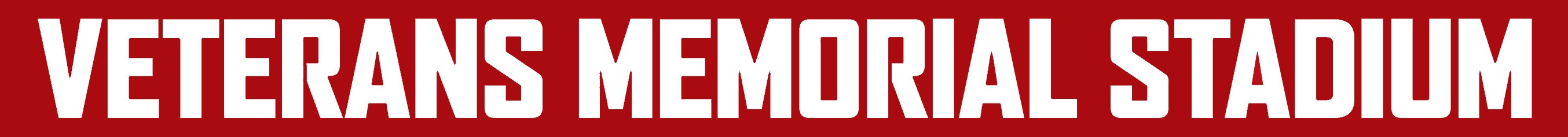

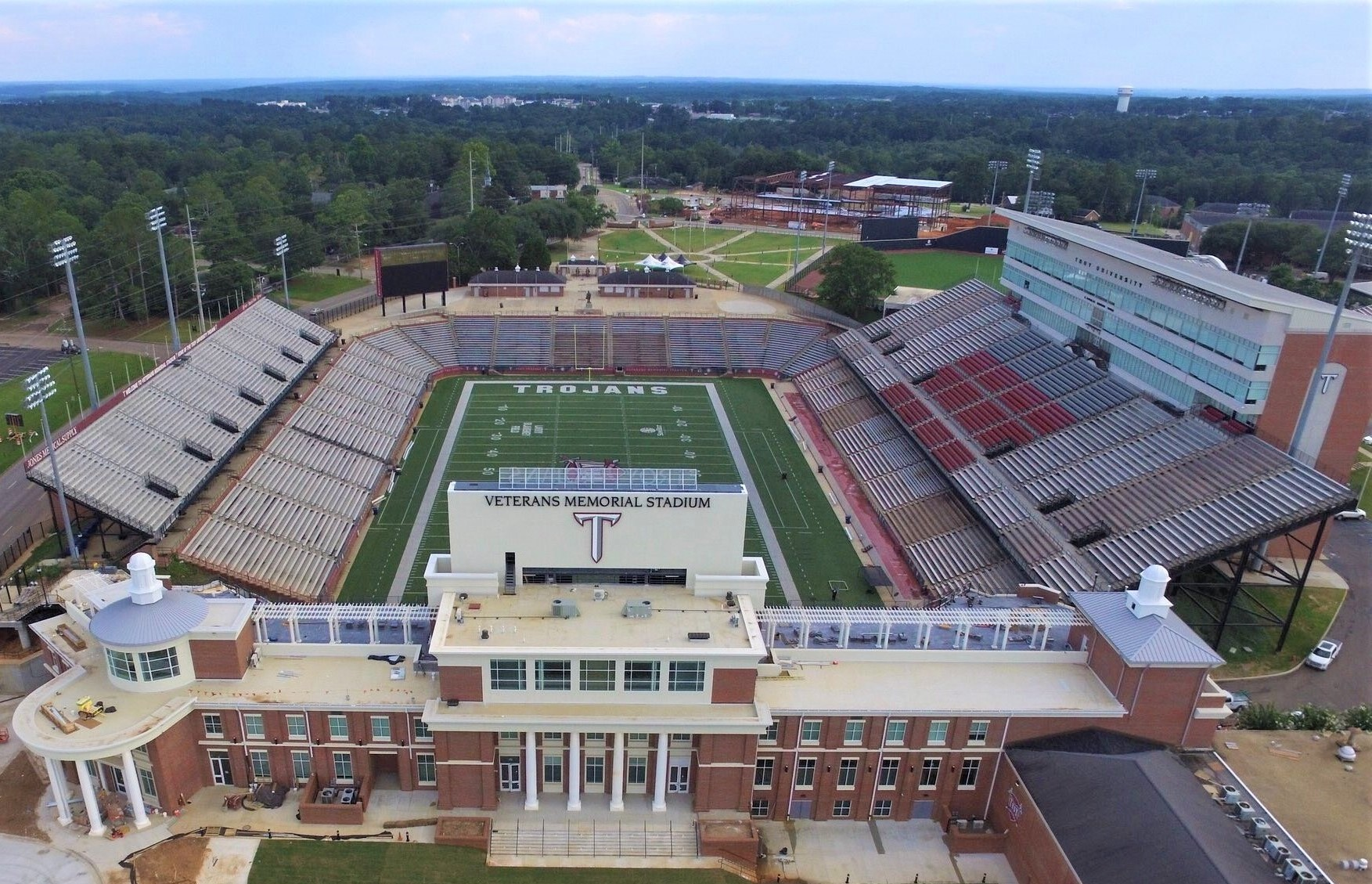
- The stadium as seen in July 2018

- Location in Alabama Location in the United States
- Former names: Veterans Memorial Stadium (1950–2002, 2010–present); Movie Gallery Stadium (2003–2010)
- Address: 338 Veterans Memorial Drive
- Location: Troy, Alabama
- Coordinates: 31°47′58″N 85°57′7″W
- Elevation: 508 ft (155 m)
- Owner: Troy University
- Operator: Troy University
- Capacity: 30,470
- Executive suites: 27
- Surface: Matrix Helix RealFill
- Scoreboard: 1 Daktronics 15HD (3,150 sq. ft.); 1 Daktronics 15HD (1,240 sq. ft.); 2 Daktronics Slim-LED Ribbon Boards
- Screen: 4
- Record attendance: 31,010 November 12, 2022 vs Army
- Public transit: Trojan Transportation

Construction
- Groundbreaking: 1950
- Opened: September 16, 1950
- Renovated: 2009, 2012, 2014
- Expanded: 1998, 2003, 2017
- Cost: $65,000 (Original) (1950); 1972 Renovation - $5 million 1992 Renovation - $15 million 1998 Renovation - $18 million 2002 Renovation - $18 million 2014 Renovation - $8.5 million 2017 Expansion - $24 million Accumulated cost - $88.6 million
- Architects: HOK Sport (2003 renovation); Goodwyn, Mills and Cawood (2017 renovation)
- Main contractor: Whaley Construction

Tenants
- Troy Trojans (NCAA) (1950–present); Charles Henderson High School; Blue-Gray Football Classic (2003)

Website
- troytrojans.com/veterans-memorial-stadium

Veterans Memorial Stadium at Larry Blakeney Field is a stadium in Troy, Alabama. It is primarily used for American football, and is the home field of the Troy University Trojans. The seating capacity is 30,470. The stadium was originally built in 1950, and has regularly been expanded, renovated and improved since then. The stadium was named in honor of the college students and local residents who gave their lives during World War II. The field received its name from retired head coach Larry Blakeney, the coach with the most wins in Troy history.

== History ==
=== Early history ===
Veterans Memorial Stadium was originally dedicated in 1950 to the Troy State Teachers College students and Pike County residents who had died in World War II. The stadium solely consisted of a small, 5,000-seat grandstand on the west side of the running track, and was built into the natural slope of the ground. It has been expanded or renovated several times over the past few decades.

=== 1998 expansion ===
In 1998, the stadium underwent a major renovation. A large upper deck was added on the west side of the stadium, increasing capacity from 12,000 seats to 17,500 seats. A new scoreboard with a small video board was also added.

Costs for the 1998 expansion of the stadium were financed in part by a substantial donation from HealthSouth founder Richard M. Scrushy. The playing field (but not the stadium) was renamed Richard M. Scrushy Field, but this became a public relations problem for Troy University when Scrushy was forced out of his position due to alleged financial misdeeds at HealthSouth in 2003; he was later tried for these, but acquitted. (Scrushy was later convicted of other unrelated crimes, along with former Alabama governor Don Siegelman.)

=== 2003 expansion ===
Renovations were again carried out in 2003, just two seasons after the Trojans made the move to Division I-A (FBS). The old press box area, which had cut into the 1998 upper deck, was filled in with chair-back seats. A much larger, 6-story press box/box tower was built behind the newly completed upper deck. The track was removed and the field was lowered, and permanent seating was placed over the old berm area behind the south grandstand. The east grandstand seating was removed and rebuilt, adding a new lower deck and upper deck. As a result of the seat additions and renovations, the stadium's seating capacity expanded to 30,000. The stadium was now a flattened "U" shape. A large-screen end zone replay board was installed in 2003 in the North end zone, along with a state-of-the-art Danley sound system.

The natural grass surface was also removed in 2003, being replaced with AstroPlay synthetic grass. Troy was one of the first schools to feature the synthetic grass on a football field. The AstroPlay surface was then replaced by the ProGrass synthetic turf system in 2012.

Construction costs for the 2003 renovation/expansion were financed in part by the sale of naming rights to the video rental chain Movie Gallery. Because of this, Scrushy's name was removed from the field, and the stadium was renamed Movie Gallery Veterans Stadium until 2010.

=== 2011 re-naming of field ===
After eight years of the field no longer having been named, the university decided to name the field Larry Blakeney Field. This naming was in honor of legendary and long-time coach Larry Blakeney, who was still coaching the Trojans football team at the time. The field remains Larry Blakeney Field to this day.

=== 2012/2014 renovations ===
During this time, no major expansions were performed that would affect seating capacity. A few moderate renovations were performed, with the first being that the AstroPlay synthetic grass surface was replaced by the new ProGrass synthetic turf system in 2012.

In 2014, the next renovation was to add a 1,240-square-foot (115 m^{2}) Daktronics 15HD LED video board in the eastern corner of the south end zone above the lower stands. In addition to this, new 300 feet (91 m) long Daktronics Slim-LED video ribbon boards were installed front of both the east and west upper decks. A new sound system was also installed.

=== 2017 expansion ===
On November 12, 2016, ground was broken on the $24-million North End zone Facility, which was completed in 2018. The facility added 402 club-level seats, a first-floor that houses a strength and conditioning area and nutrition station; a second-floor locker room, sports medicine facility, team lounge and "cool-down" plunge pool; and a third floor filled with coaches’ offices, meeting rooms, video services and a recruiting lounge. A 3,150-square-foot (293 m^{2}) Daktronics 15HD LED video board was also installed on the top of the facility, which is the largest video board in the Sun Belt Conference, as well as one of the largest video boards among Group of Five programs.

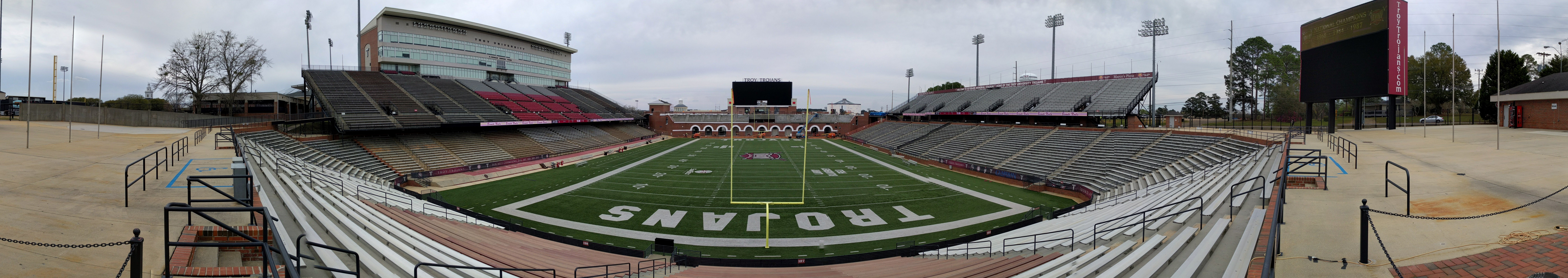
2018 Panorama of Veterans Memorial Stadium at Larry Blakeney Field

== Features ==
- Six-story box/press box tower that houses 27 sky-boxes, a media hosting facility, a Club area that houses more than 1,000 guests, and floors dedicated to sports medicine, academics, strength and conditioning, and media relations.
- Three-story north end zone facility with 402 stadium-club seats, locker rooms, strength & conditioning center, athletic training facility, nutrition station, cool-down pools, team lounge, recruiting lounge, football staff offices, and meeting rooms. with Daktronics installed a 1,250-square-foot (116 m^{2}) video board in the corner of the south end zone. Also installed were 1,800-square-foot (170 m^{2}) of video ribbon boards that were placed on the front of both the west and east upper decks from end zone to end zone. A new sound system was also installed.
- ProGrass synthetic grass turf.
- Daktronics 15HD LED video board in the north end zone (3,150 sq ft (293 m^{2}))
- Daktronics 15HD LED video board in the south end zone corner (1,240 sq ft (115 m^{2}))
- Two Daktronics Slim-LED ribbon boards on both east and west upper decks.
- Tailgate Terrace just outside of the stadium main entrance.
- Multiple concession areas serving a variety of foods and drinks, including Domino's Pizza and Chick-fil-A. Troy is also one of the less than 30 universities that sell alcoholic-drinks during football games. The university has an exclusive deal with Anheuser-Busch.

== Attendance records ==
The largest crowd to see a Troy football game in Veterans Memorial Stadium was 31,010 on November 12, 2022, when the Trojans hosted Army on Veterans Day Weekend. Troy won by a final score of 10–9.

Rank	Date	Attendance	Opponent	Result
1	November 12, 2022	31,010	Army	W 10–9
2	September 1, 2018	29,612	No. 22 Boise State	L, 20–59
3	September 9, 2017	29,278	Alabama State	W 34–7
4	September 22, 2024	29,024	Florida A&M	W, 34–12
5	September 15, 2012	29,013	Mississippi State	L, 24–30

== Gameday traditions ==
=== Trojan Walk ===
Before each Troy home football game, hundreds of Troy fans and students line University Avenue on campus to cheer on the team as they march with the Sound of the South band and cheerleaders from the Quad to Tailgate Terrace, surrounded by fans who pat them on the back and shake their hands as they walk toward Veterans Memorial Stadium.

=== Trojan Fanfare ===
During the pre-game show at Veterans Memorial Stadium, the Sound of the South will perform what is known as the "Trojan Fanfare." It is a favorite among most fans and energizes the fanbase leading up to kickoff.

=== "Havoc!" ===
One of the more popular traditions of gameday, during the pre-game show the band marches onto the field to prepare for the football team to run out of the gates. The band falls silent, and the announcer then recites the phrase from William Shakespeare's Julius Caesar. Fans in the stadium will yell out "Havoc!" in unison along with the announcer before the last line of the phrase:

And so, with mighty warriors clad in strongest armor
and well prepared to receive the lot dealt by fate
the contest is at hand.
And the commander's spirit, ranging for revenge
shall in a monarch's voice cry, 'Havoc!'
and let slip the dogs of war.

=== Trojan Warrior ===
Before every game and after every touchdown, the Trojan Warrior or Trojan Princess would blaze down the football field on a horse named "Big Red." This tradition is no longer used because the football field turf was changed from real grass to artificial grass.

== Blue–Gray Football Classic ==
The stadium hosted the last Blue–Gray Football Classic in 2003 after moving from Cramton Bowl in Montgomery, Alabama, where the game had been played for nearly 62 straight years. The annual college football all-star game was cancelled by the Lions Club of Montgomery, Alabama due to the lack of a title sponsor.

== Gallery ==
Veterans Memorial Stadium at Larry Blakeney Field
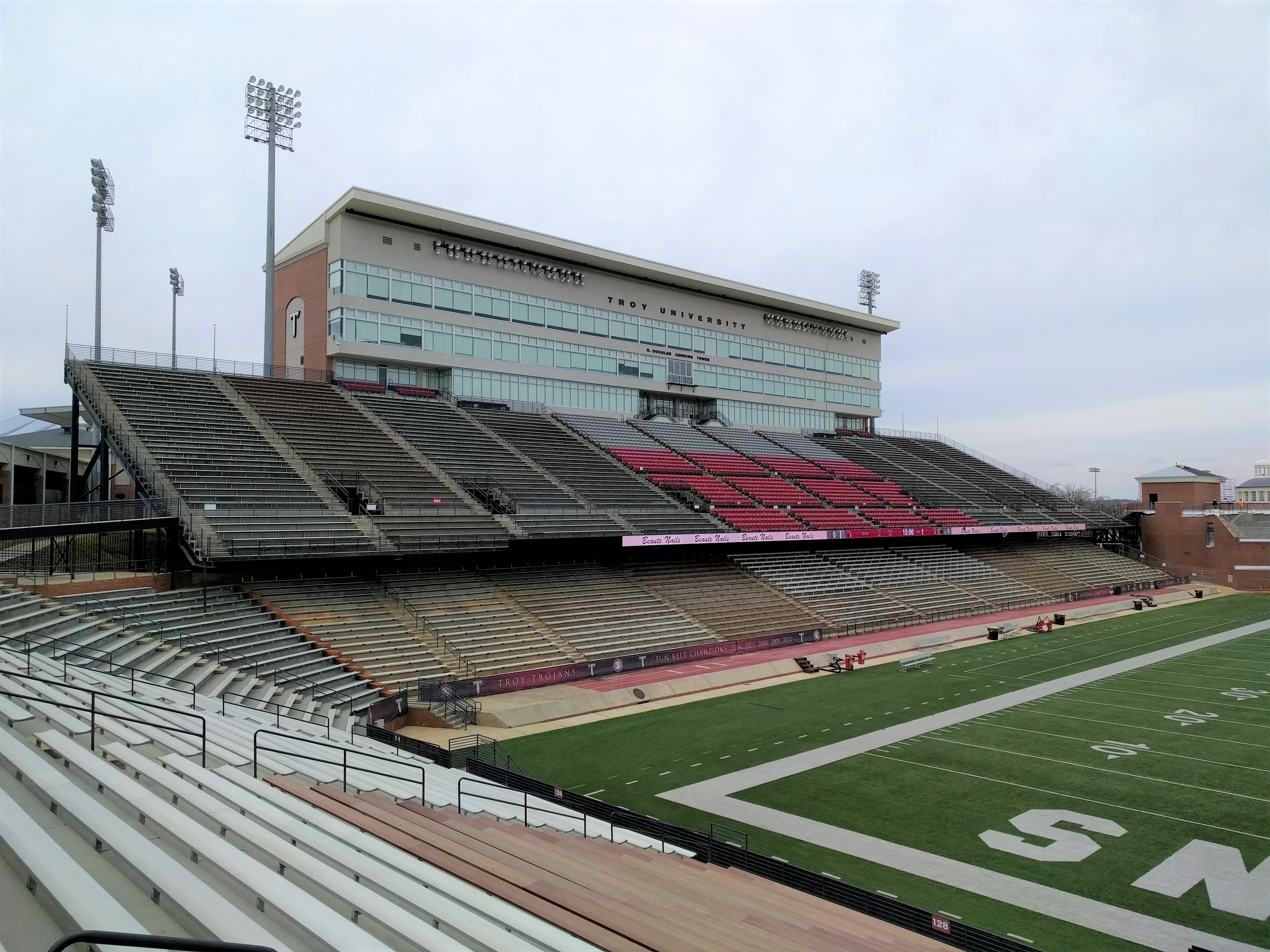
Grandstands

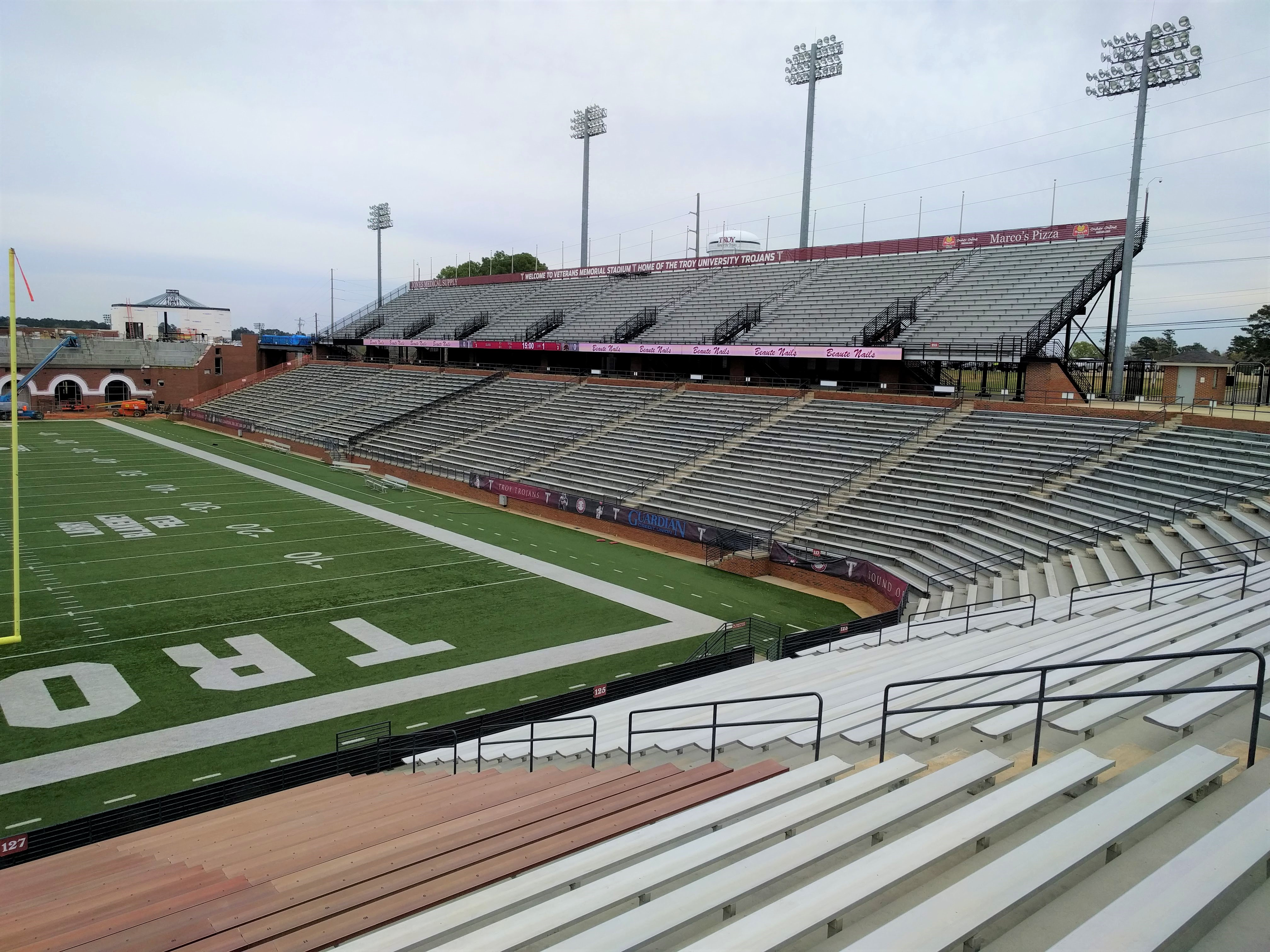

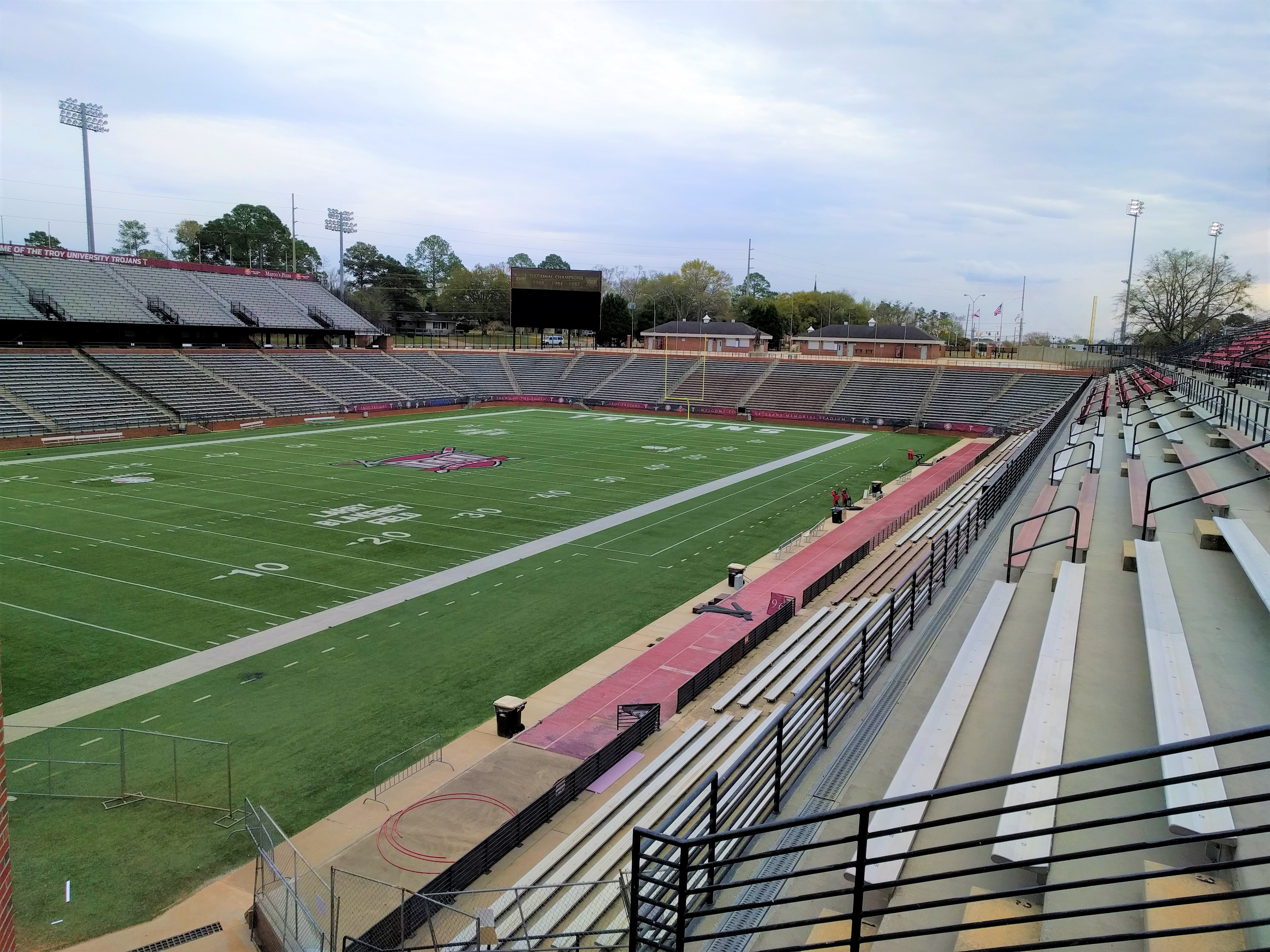

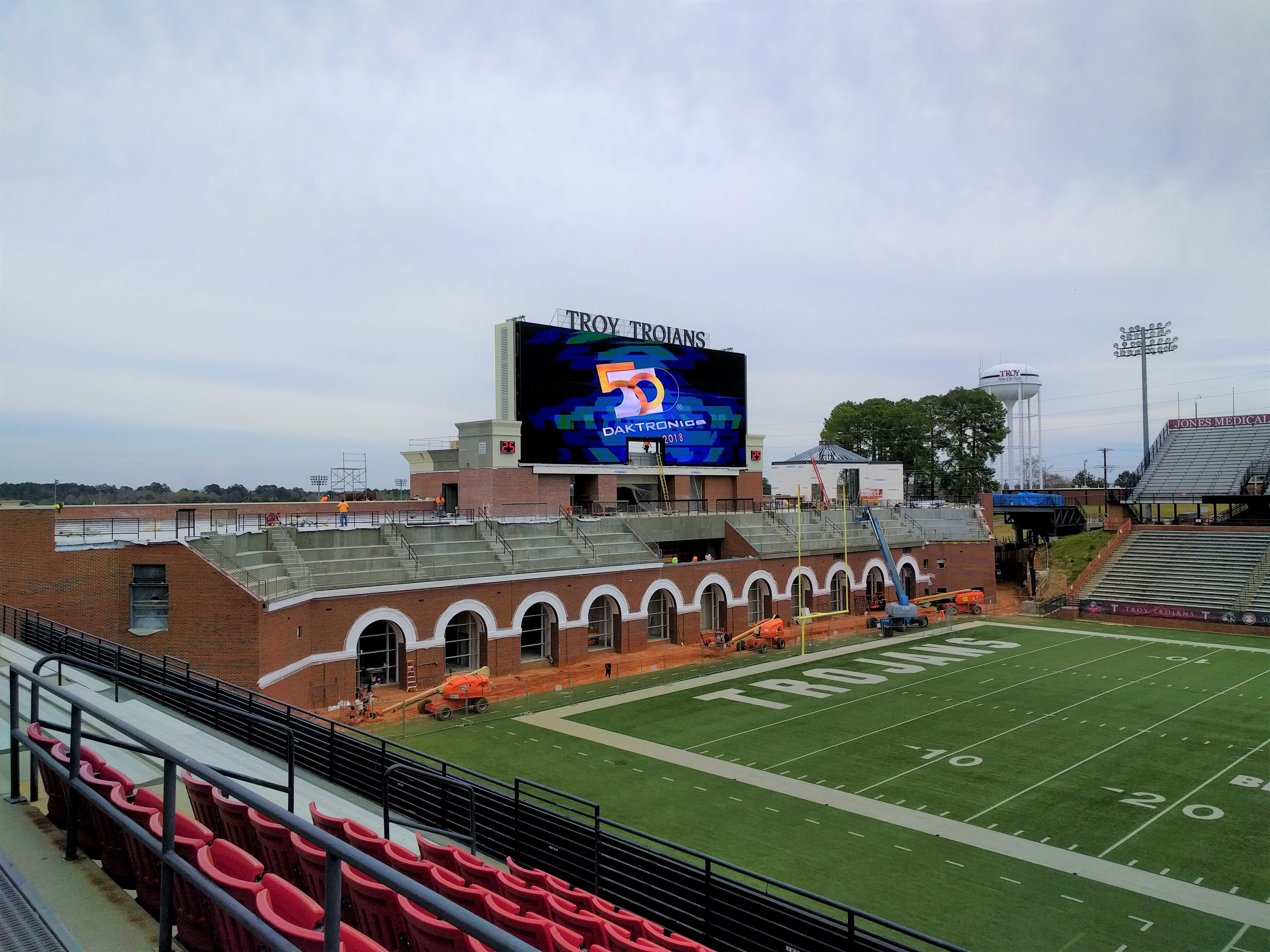

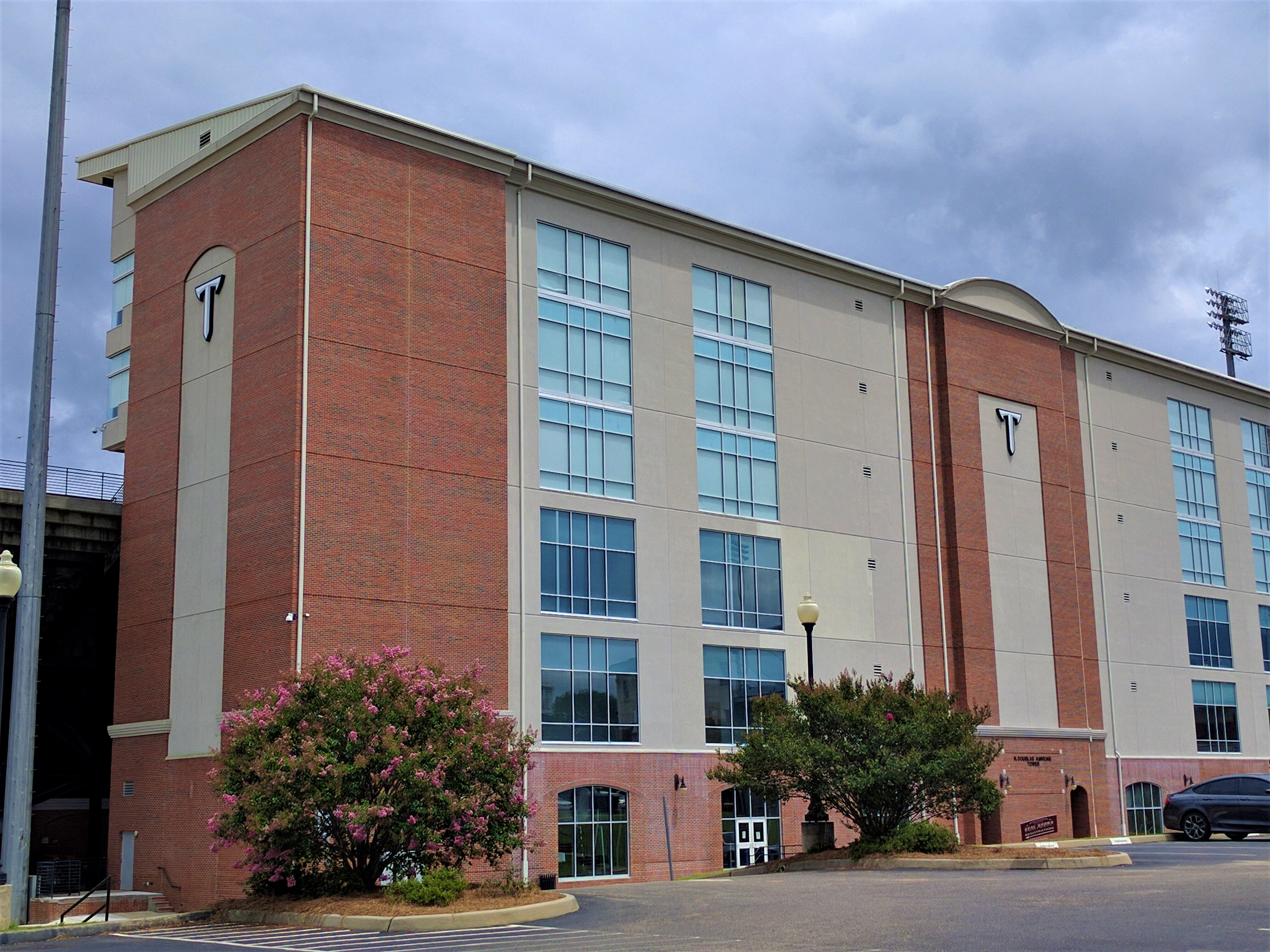
Press box tower

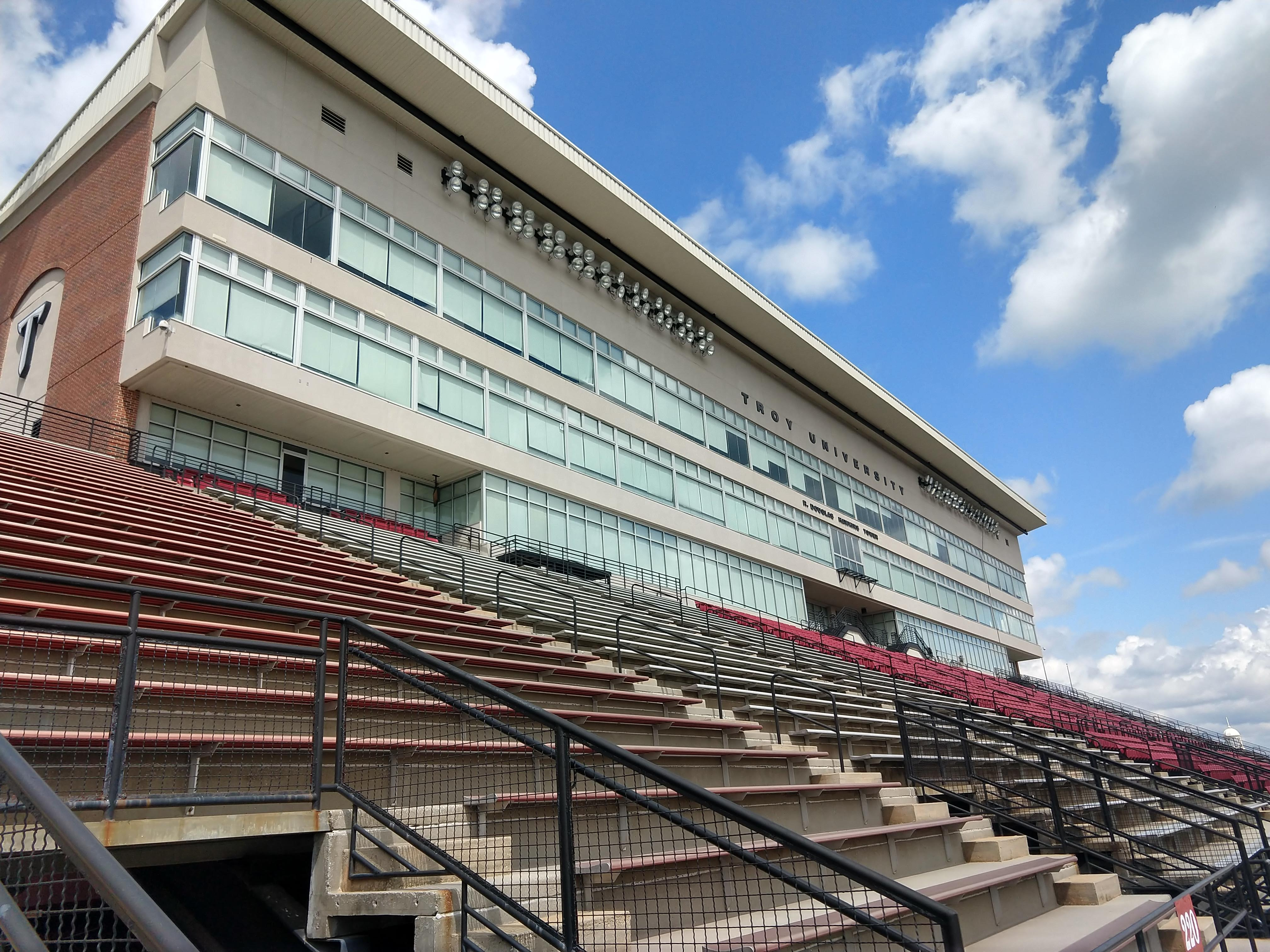
Suites and press box

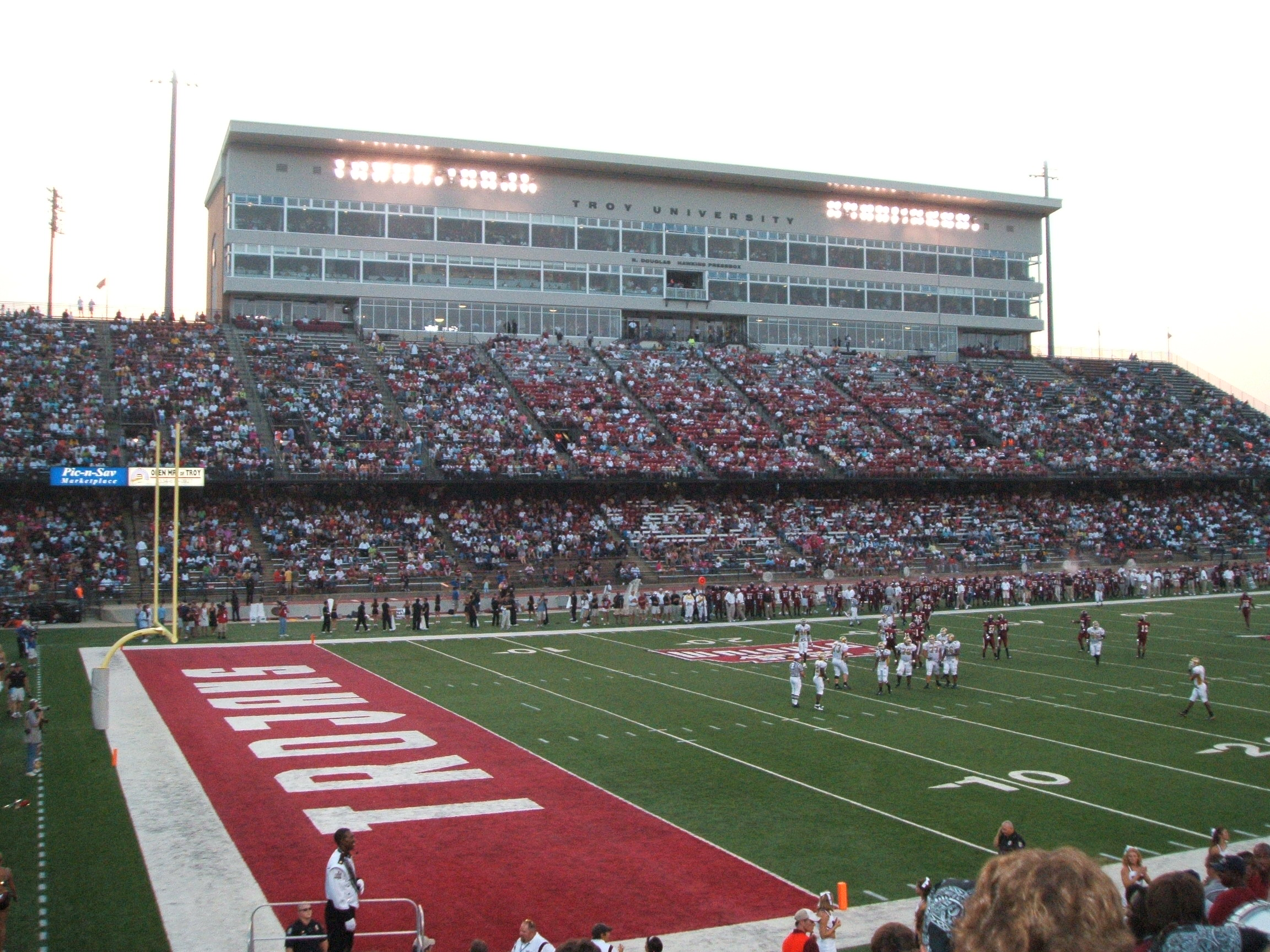

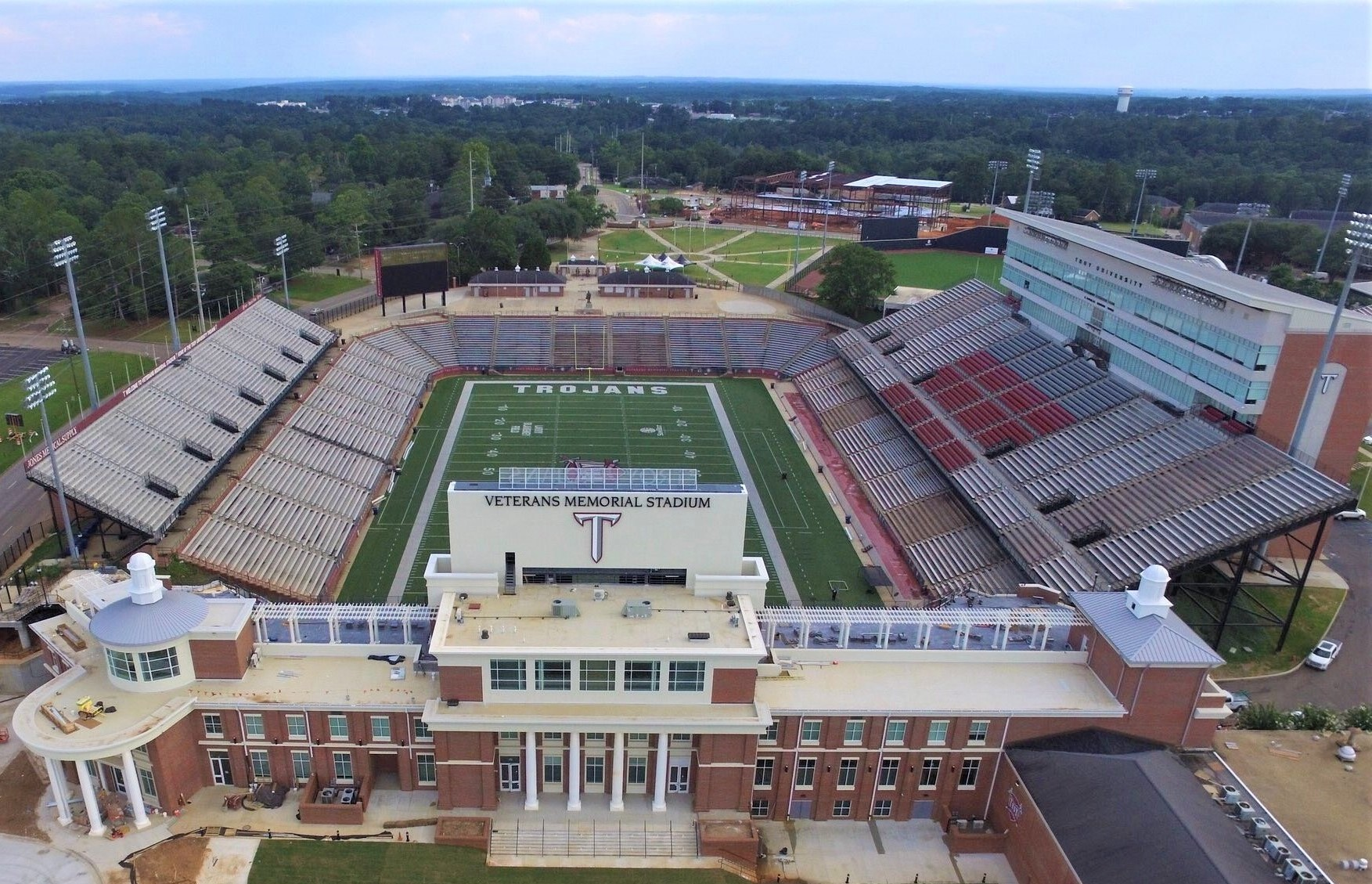

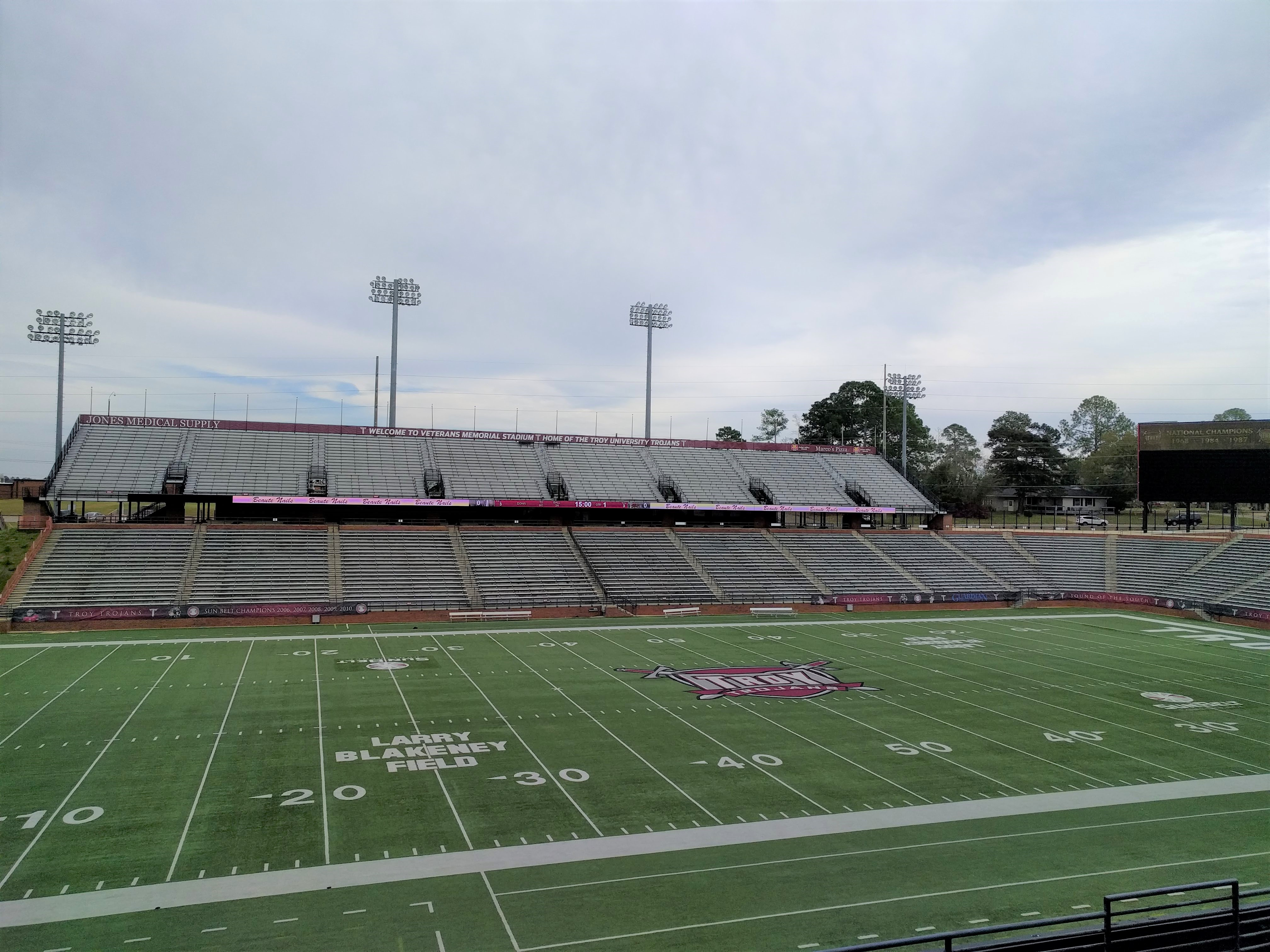
Playing surface

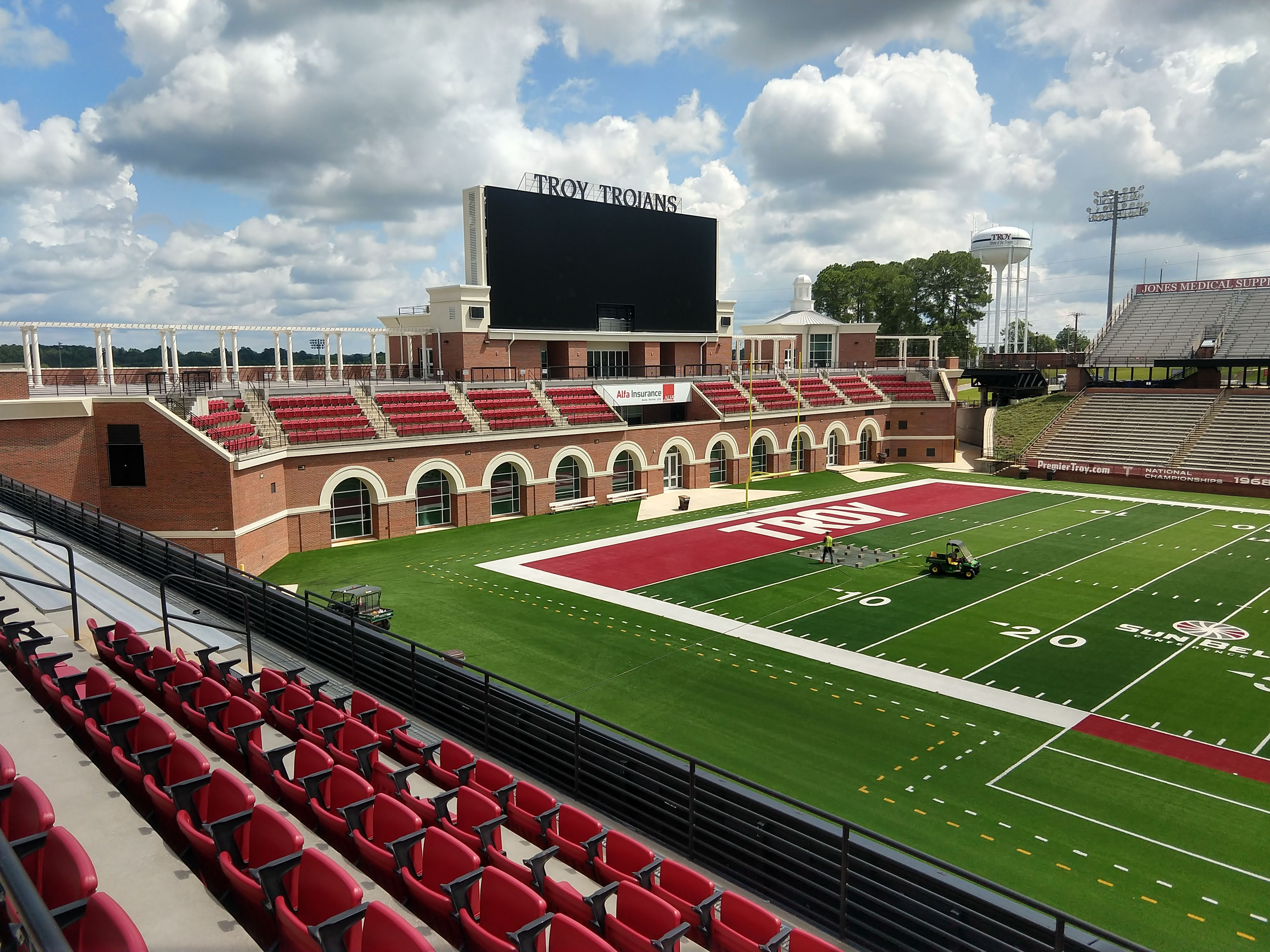
View of the North Endzone Facility

== See also ==
- List of NCAA Division I FBS football stadiums
