= AmFirst Stadium =

Multi-purpose stadium in Alabama, US

Burgess-Snow Field at AmFirst Stadium
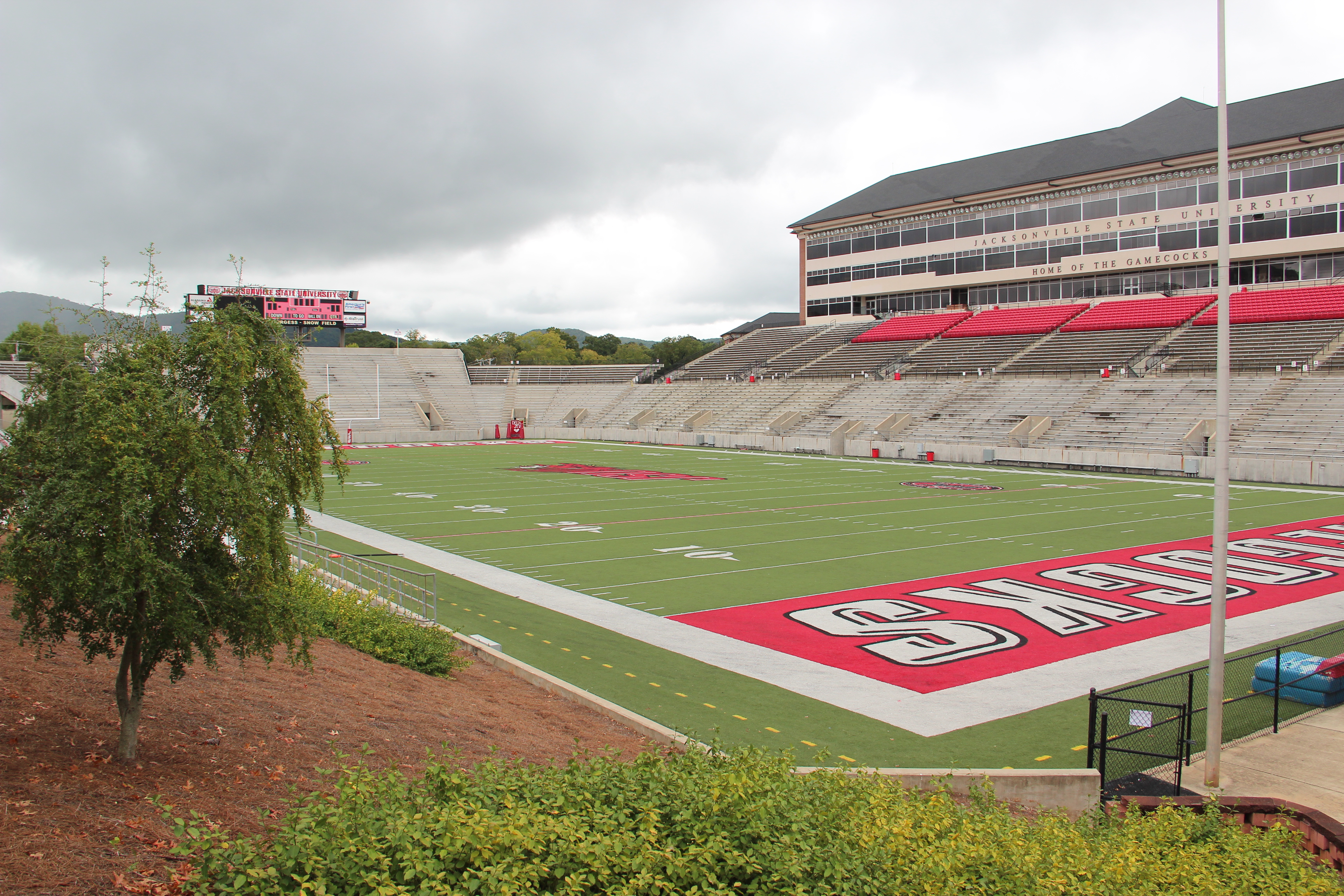
- Interactive map of Burgess-Snow Field at AmFirst Stadium
- Full name: Burgess–Snow Field at AmFirst Stadium
- Former names: College Bowl (1947–1960); Paul Snow Stadium (1961–2009); Burgess–Snow Field at JSU Stadium (2010–2023)
- Location: 700 Pelham Road; Jacksonville, AL 36265
- Coordinates: 33°49′13″N 85°45′59″W
- Owner: Jacksonville State University
- Operator: Jacksonville State University
- Capacity: 22,500 (2024–present); 24,000 (2010–2023); 15,000 (1978–2009); 8,500 (1965–1977); 5,000 (1947–1964)
- Executive suites: 33 Suites with up to 20 seats each
- Surface: ProGrass
- Record attendance: 24,166; Nov. 15, 2025 vs Kennesaw State Owls

Construction
- Groundbreaking: January 1947
- Opened: November 15, 1947
- Expanded: 1965, 1978, 2010
- Cost: $47 million (renovation)
- Architects: McKee and Associates (renovation)

Tenants
- Jacksonville State Gamecocks (NCAA) 1947–present Jacksonville High School Golden Eagles (AHSAA) until 2004; Jacksonville Christian Academy Thunder (AHSAA) 2005–2007

Burgess–Snow Field at AmFirst Stadium is a 22,500-seat stadium in Jacksonville, Alabama. It opened in 1947 and is home to the Jacksonville State Gamecocks football team. It was also home to the Jacksonville High School Golden Eagles football team until 2004, when they moved to a new stadium on the grounds of the high school campus. It also served as home to Jacksonville Christian Academy's football team from 2005 until September 27, 2007, when JCA opened an on campus football field.

== History ==
Jacksonville State was originally known as the Jacksonville Teachers College Eagle Owls. The football team played its games next to John Forney National Guard Armory.

The College Bowl, as it was known originally, was built on a site behind Stephenson Hall and dedicated at homecoming 1947. The Gamecocks, as they had come to be known, opened the new stadium with a win over Pembroke. The initial season at the College Bowl was as successful one, as the Gamecocks completed the season undefeated (and untied) with 9 wins.

The College Bowl officially became Paul Snow Stadium in 1961. That year, the stadium was dedicated to longtime Jacksonville State supporter Paul Snow.

Burgess-Snow Stadium was renovated in 1965 when seating was expanded from 5,000 to 8,500. A new press box was installed on the north side of the facility. Under the supervision of longtime Athletic Director Jerry N. Cole, a field house was constructed in 1977. A student section was added in 1978, bringing the total capacity to 15,000. In 2010, an expansion project including additional seating to the south stands and east endzone and the seven-story Stadium Tower (floors 1-4 function as a residence hall for students, while floors 5-7 house skyboxes and the press box) was completed, increasing the seating capacity to 24,000. In 2015, Stadium Tower was renamed William A. Meehan Hall in honor of former Jacksonville State President William A. Meehan, who retired that year.

In 2010, the name of Paul Snow Stadium was changed to Burgess–Snow Field at JSU Stadium, in honor of former Jacksonville State coach Bill Burgess who coached the team to the 1992 Division II championship.

In July 2024, AmFirst announced a five-year naming rights deal to rebrand the stadium as AmFirst Stadium.

== Improvements ==
Artificial turf was placed in Burgess–Snow Field in time for the 2005 Football season. The turf is the same used by many colleges, high schools and pro teams (ProGrass). This was the first renovation to the stadium. In early 2007, a new scoreboard with video screens was placed over the seats in the east endzone.

== Memorable dates ==
- 1947: Jacksonville State defeats Pembroke 48–0 in the stadium's (then known as College Bowl) initial game.
- November 27, 1982: Jacksonville State defeats Northeastern Missouri 34–21 in the stadium's first NCAA postseason football game.
- November 21, 1987 to September 15, 1990: Jacksonville State wins 15 consecutive home games.
- September 9, 1995: Jacksonville State defeats the University of West Georgia in the stadium's first Division I NCAA football game.
- November 11, 1995: Freshman quarterback JeDarius Isaac completes a 42-yard touchdown pass to Patrick Plott with three seconds remaining in the game to secure a 32–27 homecoming victory for JSU over Western Illinois University.
- September 6, 1997: Montressa Kirby throws five touchdown passes in JSU's 42–47 loss to Southwest Missouri State.
- November 15, 1997: Southwest Texas State running back Claude Mathis rushes for 308 yards in a 35–27 victory over Jacksonville State.
- August 30, 2001: Ashley Martin kicks two PAT's in Jacksonville States's 72–10 win over Cumberland University to become the first female to play and score in an NCAA football game.
- August 31, 2002: Jacksonville State defeats Alabama A&M 20–17 before 16,851 in attendance; at that time the largest crowd to attend a single football game at Paul Snow Stadium.
- November 6, 2004: Jacksonville State accumulates 646 total yards of offense in a 51–18 homecoming victory over Samford University.
- October 15, 2005: Jacksonville State intercepts Tennessee-Martin quarterback Brady Wahlberg five times in a 37–17 Gamecock victory over the Skyhawks.
- September 11, 2010: The newly renovated Burgess–Snow Field is dedicated as the Gamecocks defeat Chattanooga before a then-record crowd of 22,186.
- December 19, 2015: Jacksonville State defeats Sam Houston State 62–10 in the NCAA Division I Semifinals before a record crowd of 23,692.
- August 26, 2023: Jacksonville State defeats UTEP 17–14 in the stadium's first Division I FBS football game.

== See also ==
- List of NCAA Division I FBS football stadiums
