= Southern States Conference =

- Formerly: Alabama Intercollegiate Conference (1938–1959); Alabama Collegiate Conference (1959–1972); Southern States Conference (1972–1997)
- Conference: NAIA
- Founded: 1938
- Folded: 1997
- Commissioner: Larry Maples (1996–1997)
- Headquarters: Marion, Alabama
- Region: Southern United States

Locations
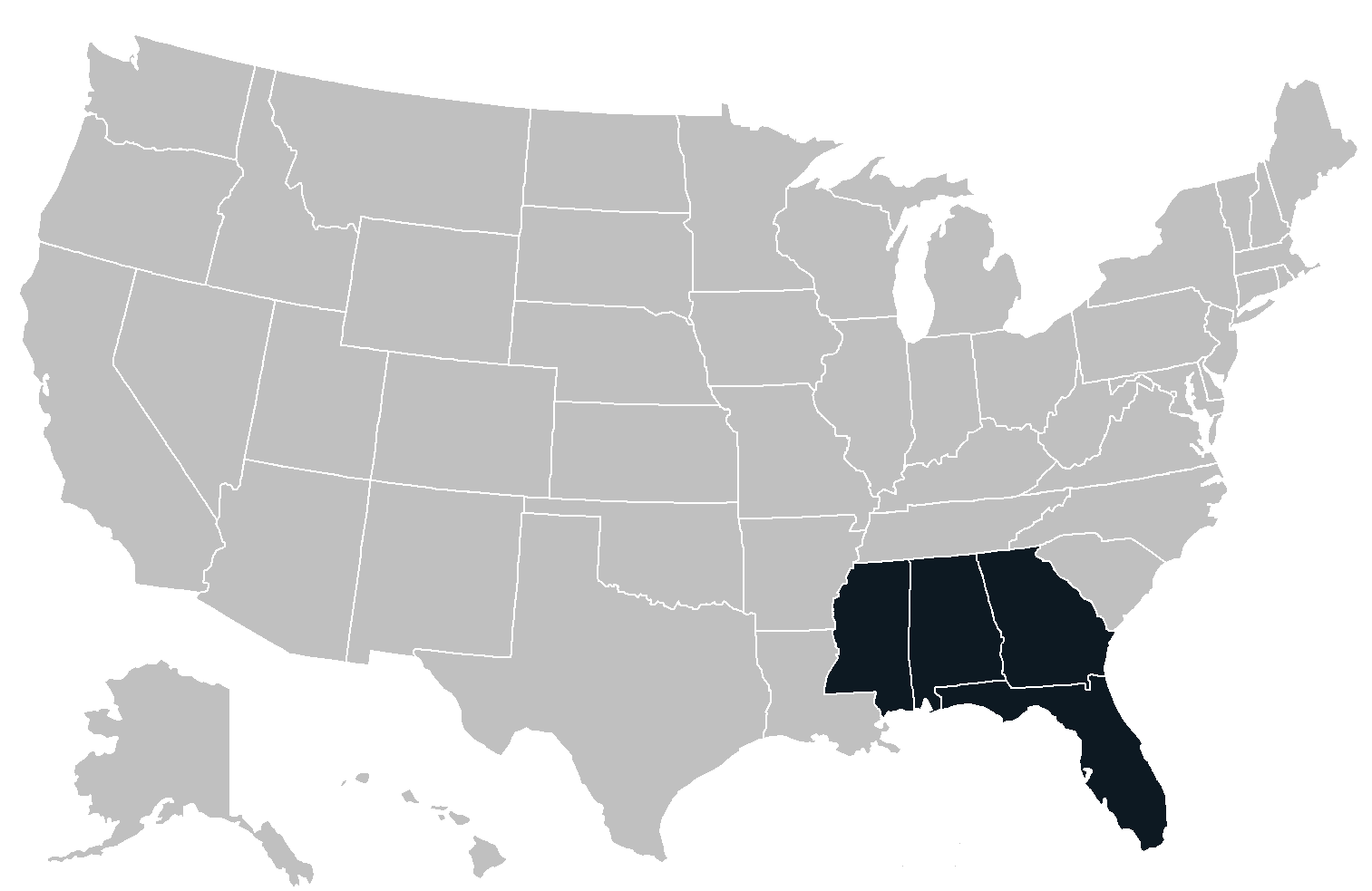

The Southern States Conference (SSC) was an affiliate of the National Association of Intercollegiate Athletics (NAIA) that included member institutions in the U.S. states of Alabama, Georgia, Mississippi, and Florida. The league existed from 1938 to 1997.

== History ==
The league was established in December 1938 as the Alabama Intercollegiate Conference (AIC), comprising schools from just that state. The six charter members were: Jacksonville State Teachers College, Saint Bernard College, Troy State Teachers College, Snead Junior College, Livingston State Teachers College, and Marion Military Institute. The league ceased operations in 1942 because of World War II and because several member schools dropped their intercollegiate athletics programs. The AIC was reformed again in January 1948 after a five year lapse. In 1959 it was renamed the Alabama Collegiate Conference (ACC), and then in May 1972, the league was rebranded as Southern States Conference.

At the conclusion of the 1994–95 school year, two schools left the SSC, causing league membership to dip below the six required to have an NAIA championship in every sport except basketball. The SSC then existed in 1995–96 as a basketball-only conference. It returned to an all-sports conference for 1996–97 before dissolving.

== Member schools ==
Institution	Location	Founded	Nickname	Joined (Note: Represents the calendar year when fall sports competition begins.)	Left (Note: Represents the calendar year when spring sports competition ends.)	Current conference	Ref.
Alabama Christian College / Faulkner University	Montgomery, Alabama	1942	Eagles	1981	1997	Southern States (SSAC)	
Alabama College / University of Montevallo	Montevallo, Alabama	1896	Falcons	1960	1995	Gulf South (GSC) (Note: Currently an NCAA Division II athletic conference.)	
University of Alabama in Huntsville	Huntsville, Alabama	1950	Chargers	1973	1993	Gulf South (GSC)	
Athens College	Athens, Alabama	1822	Bears	1948	1997	N/A	
Auburn University at Montgomery	Montgomery, Alabama	1967	Warhawks	1975	1997	Gulf South (GSC)	
Belhaven College	Jackson, Mississippi	1883	Blazers	1974	1981	C.C. South (CCS) (Note: Currently an NCAA Division III athletic conference.)	
Birmingham–Southern College	Birmingham, Alabama	1856	Panthers	1977	1996	N/A	
Columbus College	Columbus, Georgia	1958	Cougars	1972	1973	Peach Belt (PBC)	
Eldridge Baptist Academy / Eldridge Junior College	Eldridge, Alabama	1890	?	1939	1940	N/A	
Florence State Teachers College / University of North Alabama	Florence, Alabama	1830	Lions	1949	1971	United (UAC) (Note: Currently an NCAA Division I athletic conference.) (Note: The Western Athletic Conference was rebranded as the United Athletic Conference in July 2026.)	
Huntingdon College	Montgomery, Alabama	1854	Hawks	1960	1995	C.C. South (CCS)	
Jacksonville State Teachers College / Jacksonville State College / Jacksonville State University	Jacksonville, Alabama	1883	Gamecocks	1938	1970	Conference USA (CUSA)	
Life College	Marietta, Georgia	1974	Running Eagles	1996	1997	Southern States (SSAC)	
Livingston State Teachers College / Livingston State College	Livingston, Alabama	1835	Tigers	1938	1970	Gulf South (GSC)	
Marion Military Institute	Marion, Alabama	1842	Tigers	1938	1956	Alabama (ACCC) (Note: Currently an NJCAA athletic conference.)	
Saint Bernard College / Southern Benedictine College	Cullman, Alabama	1929	Saints	1938	1979	N/A	
Selma University	Selma, Alabama	1878	Bulldogs	c. 1990	1997	N/A	
Snead State Junior College	Boaz, Alabama	1898	Parsons	1938	1956	Alabama (ACCC)	
Southern Union Junior College	Wadley, Alabama	1922	Bison	1940	1956	Alabama (ACCC)	
Spring Hill College	Mobile, Alabama	1830	Badgers	1942	1981	Southern (SIAC)	
Talladega College	Talladega, Alabama	1867	Tornadoes	c. 1982	1997	HBCU (HBCUAC)	
Thomas College	Thomasville, Georgia	1950	Night Hawks	1996	1997	Southern States (SSAC)	
Troy State Teachers College / Troy State College / Troy State University	Troy, Alabama	1887	Trojans	1938	1972	Sun Belt (SBC)	
William Carey College	Hattiesburg, Mississippi	1892	Crusaders	1972	1981	Southern States (SSAC)	
University of West Florida	Pensacola, Florida	1963	Argonauts	1975	1994	Atlantic Sun (ASUN)	

== Champions ==
=== Football ===
- 1939 – Troy State
- 1940 – Livingston State
- 1941 – Troy State
- 1942–1946 – None (WWII)
- 1947 – Jacksonville State
- 1948 – Jacksonville State
- 1949 – Livingston State, Troy State
- 1950 – Livingston State
- 1951 – Livingston State
- 1952 – Florence State
- 1953 – Florence State
- 1954 – Florence State
- 1955 – Florence State
- 1956 – Florence State
- 1957 – Florence State, Jacksonville State
- 1958 – Florence State
- 1959 – Florence State, Jacksonville State
- 1960 – Florence State
- 1961 – Florence State
- 1962 – Florence State, Jacksonville State
- 1963 – Florence State, Jacksonville State
- 1964 – Jacksonville State
- 1965 – Jacksonville State
- 1966 – Jacksonville State
- 1967 – Troy State
- 1968 – Troy State
- 1969 – Troy State
