= Battle for the Ol' School Bell =

American college football rivalry

- Jacksonville State Gamecocks Troy Trojans
- Sport: Football
- First meeting: November 27, 1924; Jacksonville State, 14–9
- Latest meeting: December 16, 2025; Jacksonville State, 17–13
- Trophy: Ol' School Bell

Statistics
- Total meetings: 64
- All-time series: Jacksonville State leads, 34–28–2
- Largest victory: Troy State, 49–0 (1997)
- Longest win streak: Jacksonville State, 13 (1954–1966)
- Current win streak: Jacksonville State, 1 (2025–present)
- Locations in Alabama

The Battle for the Ol' School Bell is a rivalry between the Troy Trojans (formerly the Troy State Trojans) and the Jacksonville State Gamecocks when the two schools started playing together in Division II. The idea for a school bell trophy stemmed from the two schools' common origins as teachers' colleges.

The series continued as the Trojans moved to Division I-AA (now the FCS), with the Gamecocks moving to the division soon after. The series came to a halt when Troy moved to what is now the Division I FBS, with their last meeting before the hiatus taking place in 2001.

In 2023, Jacksonville State moved to the FBS after joining Conference USA; the two teams met for the first time in FBS play on December 16, 2025, during the 2025 Salute to Veterans Bowl.

== History ==
The two teams first met in 1924 in Jacksonville, Alabama. The series was halted after the 2001 game with Troy State move to FBS. Jacksonville State leads the series 34–28–2. Troy has gone 12–4 since 1983 against the Gamecocks. The teams faced each other in the Salute to Veterans Bowl on December 16, 2025 at Cramton Bowl in Montgomery, Alabama, with Jacksonville State prevailing 17–13.

== Game results ==
Jacksonville State victories	Troy victories	Tie games

No.	Date	Location	Winner	Score
1	November 27, 1924	Jacksonville, AL	Jacksonville State	14–9
2	October 28, 1927	Troy, AL	Jacksonville State	26–12
3	November 16, 1928	Troy, AL	Jacksonville State	20–0
4	October 3, 1931	Jacksonville, AL	Troy State	24–6
5	November 12, 1932	Montgomery, AL	Troy State	20–0
6	November 10, 1933	Jacksonville, AL	Troy State	18–7
7	October 26, 1934	Troy, AL	Troy State	32–0
8	November 11, 1938	Jacksonville, AL	Tie	6–6
9	November 11, 1939	Troy, AL	Troy State	27–0
10	November 8, 1940	Troy, AL	Jacksonville State	7–0
11	October 17, 1946	Anniston, AL	Troy State	12–0
12	October 17, 1947	Troy, AL	Jacksonville State	14–0
13	October 14, 1948	Jacksonville, AL	Jacksonville State	25–13
14	December 18, 1948	Pensacola, FL	Jacksonville State	19–0
15	October 15, 1949	Troy, AL	Troy State	27–6
16	October 14, 1950	Montgomery, AL	Jacksonville State	9–0
17	October 13, 1951	Troy, AL	Jacksonville State	13–7
18	October 18, 1952	Jacksonville, AL	Troy State	19–6
19	October 17, 1953	Troy, AL	Troy State	13–7
20	October 16, 1954	Jacksonville, AL	Jacksonville State	38–7
21	October 15, 1955	Troy, AL	Jacksonville State	12–0
22	October 13, 1956	Jacksonville, AL	Jacksonville State	27–14
23	October 12, 1957	Troy, AL	Jacksonville State	13–0
24	October 11, 1958	Jacksonville, AL	Jacksonville State	20–7
25	October 10, 1959	Troy, AL	Jacksonville State	35–12
26	October 8, 1960	Jacksonville, AL	Jacksonville State	27–6
27	October 7, 1961	Troy, AL	Jacksonville State	22–21
28	October 6, 1962	Jacksonville, AL	Jacksonville State	21–14
29	October 5, 1963	Troy, AL	Jacksonville State	15–8
30	October 3, 1964	Jacksonville, AL	Jacksonville State	38–0
31	October 2, 1965	Troy, AL	Jacksonville State	9–7
32	October 15, 1966	Jacksonville, AL	Jacksonville State	27–6
33	October 14, 1967	Troy, AL	Troy State	46–0

No.	Date	Location	Winner	Score
34	October 19, 1968	Jacksonville, AL	Troy State	31–0
35	October 18, 1969	Troy, AL	Troy State	37–6
36	October 17, 1970	Jacksonville, AL	Jacksonville State	55–10
37	October 16, 1971	Troy, AL	Troy State	42–28
38	November 11, 1972	Jacksonville, AL	Tie	14–14
39	November 10, 1973	Troy, AL	Jacksonville State	38–14
40	November 16, 1974	Jacksonville, AL	Jacksonville State	23–12
41	November 15, 1975	Troy, AL	Troy State	26–10
42	November 13, 1976	Jacksonville, AL	Troy State	19–16
43	November 12, 1977	Troy, AL	Jacksonville State	17–9
44	November 11, 1978	Jacksonville, AL	Jacksonville State	42–21
45	November 10, 1979	Troy, AL	Troy State	12–10
46	November 15, 1980	Jacksonville, AL	Jacksonville State	13–8
47	November 14, 1981	Troy, AL	Jacksonville State	31–24
48	November 13, 1982	Jacksonville, AL	Jacksonville State	49–14
49	November 12, 1983	Troy, AL	Troy State	45–3
50	November 10, 1984	Jacksonville, AL	Troy State	42–39
51	November 16, 1985	Troy, AL	Troy State	31–14
52	November 15, 1986	Jacksonville, AL	Troy State	45–43
53	November 14, 1987	Troy, AL	Troy State	14–9
54	November 5, 1988	Jacksonville, AL	Jacksonville State	31–3
55	November 4, 1989	Troy, AL	Jacksonville State	38–3
56	November 3, 1990	Jacksonville, AL	Jacksonville State	21–10
57	October 21, 1995	Troy, AL	Troy State	35–7
58	October 26, 1996	Jacksonville, AL	Troy State	31–21
59	November 22, 1997	Troy, AL	Troy State	49–0
60	November 21, 1998	Jacksonville, AL	Troy State	31–7
61	November 20, 1999	Troy, AL	Troy State	35–16
62	November 18, 2000	Jacksonville, AL	Troy State	28–0
63	November 17, 2001	Troy, AL	Troy State	21–3
64	December 16, 2025	Montgomery, AL	Jacksonville State	17–13
Series: Jacksonville State leads 34–28–2

== See also ==
- List of NCAA college football rivalry games
