= Jacksonville State Gamecocks football statistical leaders =

The Jacksonville State Gamecocks football statistical leaders are individual statistical leaders of the Jacksonville State Gamecocks football program in various categories, including passing, rushing, receiving, total offense, defensive stats, and kicking. Within those areas, the lists identify single-game, single-season, and career leaders. Since 2023, the Gamecocks have represented Jacksonville State University (JSU or Jax State) in the NCAA Division I FBS Conference USA (CUSA).

Although Jacksonville State began competing in intercollegiate football in 1904, the school's official record book considers the "modern era" to have begun in 1964. Records from before this year are often incomplete and inconsistent, and they are generally not included in these lists.

JSU has played at four different levels of competition in its modern football history. In 1964, it was a member of the NAIA. which then held a single football championship. In 1970, the NAIA split into two divisions for football, with the Gamecocks joining the higher level of Division I. In 1973, the Gamecocks joined the NCAA as a Division II member, but maintained dual membership with the NAIA until aligning completely with the NCAA in 1982. After the 1994 season, it moved from Division II to Division I-AA, the latter of which was renamed Division I FCS in 2006. Jax State began a transition to FBS in advance of the 2022 season, joining CUSA in 2023 and becoming a full FBS member in 2024.

These lists are dominated by more recent players for several reasons:

- Since 1964, regular seasons have increased from 10 games to 11 and later 12 games in length. While the FCS limit was normally 11 games before a coming expansion to 12 in 2026 (matching the FBS limit), two aspects of the FCS season have allowed teams at that level more games.
  - Pre-2026 NCAA rules allowed FCS teams to schedule 12 regular-season games in years when the period starting with the Thursday before Labor Day and ending with the final Saturday in November contains 14 Saturdays.
  - The NCAA organizes an FCS championship tournament, currently called the NCAA Division I Football Championship. However, it did not include I-AA/FCS playoff games toward official season statistics until the 2002 season. During its FCS tenure, the Gamecocks reached the playoffs 10 times, giving many recent players extra games to accumulate statistics.
- Bowl games in FBS also did not count toward official season statistics until the 2002 season. Jax State has played in bowls in each of its first two CUSA seasons, and will make a third bowl appearance in 2025. (Note: Jax State would have been ineligible to play in a bowl game in 2023 as a second-year transitional FBS school, but was allowed to play due to a lack of bowl-eligible teams.)
- The NCAA did not allow freshmen to play varsity football until 1972 (with the exception of the World War II years), allowing players to have four-year careers.
- Since 2018, players in both FBS and FCS have been allowed to participate in as many as four games in a redshirt season; previously, playing in even one game "burned" the redshirt. Since 2024, postseason games have not counted against the four-game limit. These changes to redshirt rules have given very recent players several extra games to accumulate statistics.
- CUSA has held a championship game since 2005. Jax State played in and won this game in its first season of championship eligibility in 2024, and will play in the 2025 edition.
- Due to COVID-19 issues, the NCAA ruled that the 2020 season would not count against the athletic eligibility of any football player, giving everyone who played in that season the opportunity for five years of eligibility instead of the normal four.

These lists are updated through the end of the 2025 regular season. Players active for JSU in 2025 are in bold.

== Passing ==
=== Passing yards ===
Career
Rk	Player	Yards	Years
1	Zerrick Cooper	9,628	2018 2019 2020 2021
2	Eli Jenkins	7,652	2013 2014 2015 2016
3	Ed Lett	7,145	1979 1980 1981 1982
4	Montressa Kirby	6,587	1995 1996 1997 1998
5	Zion Webb	5,543	2018 2019 2020 2022 2023
6	Reggie Stancil	5,182	1999 2000 2001 2002
7	David Coffey	5,145	1983 1984 1985 1986
8	Marques Ivory	4,832	2008 2009 2010 2011 2012
9	Ryan Perrilloux	4,668	2008 2009
10	Doc Lett	4,625	1968 1969 1970 1971

Single season
Rk	Player	Yards	Year
1	Zerrick Cooper	3,416	2018
2	Zerrick Cooper	3,404	2019
3	Montressa Kirby	2,817	1997
4	Eli Jenkins	2,788	2015
5	Tyler Huff	2,543	2024
6	Ed Lett	2,484	1982
7	Ryan Perrilloux	2,350	2009
8	Ryan Perrilloux	2,318	2008
9	Montressa Kirby	2,271	1998
10	Marques Ivory	2,248	2010

Single game
Rk	Player	Yards	Year	Opponent
1	Marques Ivory	444	2010	Eastern Kentucky
2	Montressa Kirby	417	1997	Southwest Missouri State
	Zerrick Cooper	417	2018	Kennesaw State
4	Zerrick Cooper	414	2019	Southeastern Louisiana
5	Montressa Kirby	380	1997	Northwestern State
6	Montressa Kirby	379	1997	Middle Tennessee State
7	Zerrick Cooper	365	2018	Maine (FCS Playoffs)
8	Tyler Huff	362	2024	Ohio
9	Montressa Kirby	354	1997	Sam Houston State
10	Zerrick Cooper	347	2019	Southeast Missouri State

=== Passing touchdowns ===
Career
Rk	Player	TDs	Years
1	Zerrick Cooper	74	2018 2019 2020 2021
2	Ed Lett	61	1979 1980 1981 1982
3	Eli Jenkins	47	2013 2014 2015 2016
4	Montressa Kirby	43	1995 1996 1997 1998
5	Ryan Perrilloux	42	2008 2009
6	Marques Ivory	41	2008 2009 2010 2011 2012
7	Reggie Stancil	35	1999 2000 2001 2002
	Zion Webb	35	2018 2019 2020 2022 2023
9	Bobby Ray Green	29	1977 1978
	David Coffey	29	1983 1984 1985 1986
	Doc Lett	29	1968 1969 1970 1971

Single season
Rk	Player	TDs	Year
1	Zerrick Cooper	32	2018
2	Zerrick Cooper	28	2019
3	Ryan Perrilloux	23	2009
4	Ed Lett	22	1982
5	Eli Jenkins	21	2015
6	Ed Lett	20	1981
7	Ryan Perrilloux	19	2008
8	Ed Lett	18	1980
	Marques Ivory	18	2010

Single game
Rk	Player	TDs	Year	Opponent
1	Marques Ivory	6	2012	UT Martin
2	Montressa Kirby	5	1997	Southwest Missouri State
	Caden Creel	5	2026	Eastern Kentucky
4	Tim Gallahan	4	1999	Union
	Ryan Perrilloux	4	2008	Murray State
	Ryan Perrilloux	4	2009	Nicholls State
	Ryan Perrilloux	4	2009	UT Martin
	Zerrick Cooper	4	2018	Kennesaw State

== Rushing ==
=== Rushing yards ===
Career
Rk	Player	Yards	Years
1	Boyce Callahan	4,237	1970 1971 1972 1973
2	Eli Jenkins	3,796	2013 2014 2015 2016
3	DaMarcus James	3,554	2011 2012 2013 2014
4	Troymaine Pope	3,376	2012 2013 2014 2015
5	Rondy Rogers	3,143	1999 2000 2001 2002
6	Clay Green	2,914	2003 2004 2005 2006
7	Reginald Goodloe	2,628	1980 1981 1982 1983
8	David Gulledge	2,389	1987 1988 1989 1990
9	Terry Thomas	2,334	1985 1986 1987 1988
10	Zion Webb	2,278	2018 2019 2020 2022 2023

Single season
Rk	Player	Yards	Year
1	Troymaine Pope	1,788	2015
2	**Cam Cook**	1,659	2025
3	Tre Stewart	1,639	2024
4	DaMarcus James	1,477	2013
5	Rondy Rogers	1,417	2001
6	Clay Green	1,352	2005
7	Tyler Huff	1,344	2024
8	Boyce Callahan	1,293	1970
9	Kory Chapman	1,285	2003
10	Oscar Bonds	1,263	2004

Single game
Rk	Player	Yards	Year	Opponent
1	Kory Chapman	298	2003	UT Martin
2	Troymaine Pope	250	2015	Charleston Southern
3	Troymaine Pope	234	2015	Chattanooga
4	Tre Stewart	232	2024	Liberty
5	Rondy Rogers	224	2000	Northwestern State
6	**Cam Cook**	218	2025	Sam Houston
7	Washaun Ealey	217	2011	Eastern Kentucky
8	Caden Creel	211	2026	New Mexico State
9	Tre Stewart	210	2024	Middle Tennessee
10	DaMarcus James	206	2013	Southeast Missouri State

=== Rushing touchdowns ===
Career
Rk	Player	TDs	Years
1	DaMarcus James	49	2011 2012 2013 2014
2	David Gulledge	48	1987 1988 1989 1990
3	Eli Jenkins	42	2013 2014 2015 2016
4	Boyce Callahan	40	1970 1971 1972 1973
5	Troymaine Pope	34	2012 2013 2014 2015
6	Zion Webb	32	2018 2019 2020 2022 2023
7	Clay Green	30	2003 2004 2005 2006
8	Rondy Rogers	28	1999 2000 2001 2002
9	Terry Thomas	26	1985 1986 1987 1988
	Walter Broughton	26	1980 1981 1982 1983

Single season
Rk	Player	TDs	Year
1	DaMarcus James	29	2013
2	Tre Stewart	25	2024
3	Troymaine Pope	19	2015
	Oscar Bonds	19	2004
5	David Gulledge	16	1988
	David Gulledge	16	1989
	**Cam Cook**	16	2025
8	Eli Jenkins	15	2015
	Tyler Huff	15	2024
10	Walter Broughton	14	1982
	DaMarcus James	14	2014

Single game
Rk	Player	TDs	Year	Opponent
1	DaMarcus James	5	2013	Austin Peay
2	Cedric Johnson	4	2007	Austin Peay
	Eli Jenkins	4	2016	UT Martin
	Tre Stewart	4	2024	Kennesaw State
	Tre Stewart	4	2024	Liberty

== Receiving ==
=== Receptions ===
Career
Rk	Player	Rec	Years
1	Josh Barge	247	2013 2014 2015 2016
2	Joey Hamilton	178	1996 1997 1998 1999
3	Jamari Hester	161	2016 2017 2018 2019
4	Josh Pearson	126	2018 2019
5	Donald Young	125	1975 1976 1977 1978
6	Rusty Fuller	120	1980 1981 1982 1983
7	Alan Bonner	114	2009 2010 2011 2012
8	Butch Barker	104	1975 1976 1977 1978
9	Ronald Bonner	100	1997 1998
	James Wilkerson	100	2006 2007 2008 2009
	Trae Berry	100	2017 2018 2019 2020

Single season
Rk	Player	Rec	Year
1	Josh Barge	92	2015
2	Josh Pearson	67	2018
3	Ronald Bonner	62	1997
4	Donald Young	60	1977
5	Jamari Hester	59	2018
	Jamari Hester	59	2019
	Josh Pearson	59	2019
8	Joey Hamilton	58	1999
	Josh Barge	58	2013
10	Josh Barge	56	2014

Single game
Rk	Player	Rec	Year	Opponent
1	Josh Barge	14	2015	Auburn
2	Ronald Bonner	12	1997	Sam Houston State
	Jamari Hester	12	2018	Kennesaw State
4	Joey Hamilton	11	1999	Nicholls State
5	Joey Hamilton	10	1997	Middle Tennessee
	Jeffrey Cameron	10	2010	Eastern Kentucky
	Alan Bonner	10	2012	UT Martin
	Trae Barry	10	2019	Southeastern Louisiana
	Cam Vaughn	10	2024	Ohio

=== Receiving yards ===
Career
Rk	Player	Yards	Years
1	Josh Barge	3,611	2013 2014 2015 2016
2	Joey Hamilton	2,903	1996 1997 1998 1999
3	Jamari Hester	2,399	2016 2017 2018 2019
4	Josh Pearson	2,066	2018 2019
5	Alan Bonner	1,986	2009 2010 2011 2012
6	Derrick Thomas	1,976	1982 1983 1984 1985
7	James Wilkerson	1,780	2006 2007 2008 2009
8	Ralph Jenkins	1,738	2000 2001 2002 2003
9	Donald Young	1,650	1975 1976 1977 1978
10	Ronald Bonner	1,639	1997 1998

Single season
Rk	Player	Yards	Year
1	Josh Barge	1,145	2015
2	Josh Pearson	1,123	2018
3	Ronald Bonner	1,010	1997
4	Jamari Hester	1,002	2019
5	Joey Hamilton	943	1998
	Josh Pearson	943	2019
7	Josh Barge	919	2014
8	Josh Barge	885	2013
9	Jamari Hester	864	2018
10	Alan Bonner	859	2012

Single game
Rk	Player	Yards	Year	Opponent
1	Ronald Bonner	247	1997	Northwestern State
2	Alan Bonner	235	2012	UT Martin
3	Ronald Bonner	210	1997	Southwest Texas State
4	Alan Bonner	205	2011	Eastern Kentucky
5	Lorenzo Banks	192	1999	Troy State
6	Jeffrey Cameron	190	2010	Eastern Kentucky
7	Jamari Hester	186	2019	Eastern Kentucky
8	Cam Vaughn	184	2024	Ohio
9	Maurice Dupree	161	2008	Eastern Kentucky
	Joey Hamilton	161	1999	Nicholls State

=== Receiving touchdowns ===
Career
Rk	Player	TDs	Years
1	Josh Pearson	30	2018 2019
2	Joey Hamilton	23	1996 1997 1998 1999
3	Jamari Hester	22	2016 2017 2018 2019
4	Alan Bonner	20	2009 2010 2011 2012
5	Josh Barge	19	2013 2014 2015 2016
6	Derrick Thomas	18	1982 1983 1984 1985
	Rusty Fuller	17	1980 1981 1982 1983
	Ralph Jenkins	17	2000 2001 2002 2003

Single season
Rk	Player	TDs	Year
1	Josh Pearson	17	2018
2	Josh Pearson	13	2019
3	Josh Barge	11	2015
	Jamari Hester	11	2018
5	Maurice Dupree	10	2008
6	Derrick Thomas	9	1985

Single game
Rk	Player	TDs	Year	Opponent
1	Alan Bonner	5	2012	UT Martin
2	Jamill Williams	4	2026	Eastern Kentucky
3	Joey Hamilton	3	1999	Union
	Josh Barge	3	2014	West Alabama
	Josh Barge	3	2015	UT Martin
	Josh Pearson	3	2018	Eastern Illinois
	Josh Pearson	3	2018	Murray State
	Shaq Davidson	3	2018	East Tennessee State
	Josh Pearson	3	2019	North Alabama
	KJ Stepherson	3	2019	Eastern Kentucky

== Total offense ==
Total offense is the sum of passing and rushing statistics. It does not include receiving or returns.

=== Total offense yards ===
Career
Rk	Player	Yards	Years
1	Zerrick Cooper	10,563	2018 2019 2020 2021
2	Eli Jenkins	11,448	2013 2014 2015 2016
3	Zion Webb	7,821	2018 2019 2020 2022 2023
4	Montressa Kirby	7,688	1995 1996 1997 1998
5	Ed Lett	6,774	1979 1980 1981 1982
6	Reggie Stancil	6,276	1999 2000 2001 2002
7	Ryan Perrilloux	5,479	2008 2009
8	David Gulledge	5,339	1987 1988 1989 1990
9	Maurice Mullins	5,138	2002 2003 2004 2005
10	Marques Ivory	5,084	2008 2009 2010 2011 2012

Single season
Rk	Player	Yards	Year
1	Eli Jenkins	3,949	2015
2	Tyler Huff	3,887	2024
3	Zerrick Cooper	3,782	2018
4	Zerrick Cooper	3,274	2019
5	Eli Jenkins	3,091	2016
6	Montressa Kirby	2,954	1997
7	Ryan Perrilloux	2,793	2009
8	Ryan Perrilloux	2,686	2008
9	Caden Creel	2,589	2025
10	Montressa Kirby	2,581	1998

Single game
Rk	Player	Yards	Year	Opponent
1	Marques Ivory	451	2010	Eastern Kentucky
2	Montressa Kirby	433	1997	Southwest Missouri State
3	Montressa Kirby	428	1997	Sam Houston State
4	Zerrick Cooper	423	2018	Kennesaw State
5	Zerrick Cooper	405	2019	Southeastern Louisiana
6	Eli Jenkins	403	2015	Chattanooga (FCS Playoffs)
7	Montressa Kirby	400	1997	Middle Tennessee State
8	Zerrick Cooper	396	2018	Maine (FCS Playoffs)
9	Reggie Stancil	391	2001	Nicholls State
	Tyler Huff	391	2024	Eastern Michigan

=== Touchdowns responsible for ===
"Touchdowns responsible for" is the NCAA's official term for combined passing and rushing touchdowns.

Career
Rk	Player	TDs	Years
1	Zerrick Cooper	94	2018 2019 2020 2021
2	Eli Jenkins	89	2013 2014 2015 2016
3	Zion Webb	67	2018 2019 2020 2022 2023
4	Ed Lett	65	1979 1980 1981 1982
5	David Gulledge	61	1987 1988 1989 1990
6	Ryan Perrilloux	57	2008 2009
	Montressa Kirby	57	1995 1996 1997 1998
8	DaMarcus James	50	2011 2012 2013 2014
9	Marques Ivory	44	2008 2009 2010 2011 2012
	Reggie Stancil	44	1999 2000 2001 2002

Single season
Rk	Player	TDs	Year
1	Zerrick Cooper	38	2018
2	Eli Jenkins	36	2015
3	Zerrick Cooper	34	2019
4	Ryan Perrilloux	31	2009
5	DaMarcus James	29	2013
	Tyler Huff	29	2024
7	Ryan Perrilloux	26	2008
8	Tre Stewart	25	2024
9	Eli Jenkins	24	2016

== Defense ==
=== Interceptions ===
Career
Rk	Player	Ints	Years
1	Ray Vinson	16	1964 1965 1966
2	Terry Harris	13	1965 1966 1967
	Wayne Carden	13	1969 1970 1971 1972
	Darrell Malone	13	1987 1988 1989 1990
	Eurosius Parker	13	1995 1996 1997 1998
	Jaylen Hill	13	2013 2014 2015 2016
7	Doug Wheeler	12	1964 1965 1966

Single season
Rk	Player	Ints	Year
1	Ray Vinson	10	1966
2	Terry Harris	7	1967
	Gary Godfrey	7	1970
	Tim Sudduth	7	1992
	Eril McCollough	7	2000

Single game
Rk	Player	Ints	Year	Opponent
1	Darron Edwards	4	1995	Samford
2	T. J. Heath	3	2009	UT Martin

=== Tackles ===
Career
Rk	Player	Tackles	Years
1	Eric Mims	378	1995 1996 1997
2	Natarsha James	372	1997 1998 1999 2000
3	Marlon Bridges	296	2016 2017 2018 2019
4	Alexander Henderson	290	2006 2007 2008 2009
5	Alton Murphy	286	1996 1997 1998 1999
6	Jeremiah Harris	262	2018 2019 2020 2021 2022 2023
7	Rashad Smith	259	2010 2011 2012 2013
8	Fred Perry	256	2022 2023 2024
9	Cornell Buford	247	1997 1998 1999 2000
10	Jonathan Crutcher	237	2001 2002 2003 2004

Single season
Rk	Player	Tackles	Year
1	Eric Mims	145	1997
2	Eric Mims	129	1996
3	Sidney Tyus	122	1995
4	Alexander Henderson	116	2009
5	Natarsha James	111	2000
6	Natarsha James	110	1999
7	Ben Endress	109	2014
	Fred Perry	109	2024
9	Kelcey Lucas	107	1996
10	Eric Mims	104	1995

Single game
Rk	Player	Tackles	Year	Opponent
1	Eric Mims	33	1996	Nicholls State
2	Eric Mims	21	1997	Southwest Texas State
	Alexander Henderson	21	2008	Murray State
	Alexander Henderson	21	2008	UT Martin
5	Eric Mims	20	1996	UAB
6	Fred Perry	19	2024	Eastern Michigan
7	Sidney Tyus	18	1995	Western Kentucky
	Eric Mims	18	1996	West Georgia
	Eric Mims	18	1997	Sam Houston STate
	Natarsha James	18	2000	Samford
	Kolbi Fuqua	18	2023	Coastal Carolina

=== Sacks ===
Career
Rk	Player	Sacks	Years
1	Darius Jackson	27.5	2014 2015 2016 2017
2	Chris Hardie	21.5	2019 2020 2021 2022 2023
3	DJ Coleman	17.5	2018 2019 2020 2021
4	Warren Blair	16.0	1995 1996 1997 1998
	Chris Landrum	16.0	2013 2014 2015
6	Jaylen Swain	15.0	2020 2021 2022 2023 2024
7	Mark Word	14.5	1998
8	Devin Phillips	11.5	2005 2006 2007
	Randy Robinson	11.5	2015 2016 2017 2018
10	Derrick Sistrunk	11.0	2002 2003 2004 2005

Single season
Rk	Player	Sacks	Year
1	Mark Word	14.5	1998
2	Darius Jackson	10.0	2016
3	Chris Landrum	8.5	2015
	Chris Hardie	8.5	2023
5	Riley Reynolds	8.0	1995
	Warren Blair	8.0	1997

Single game
Rk	Player	Sacks	Year	Opponent
1	Mark Word	4.0	1998	Middle Tennessee STate
2	Derrick Sistrunk	3.0	2003	Murray State
	Devin Phillips	3.0	2007	UT Martin
	Santez Mays	3.0	2009	Murray State
	Dustin Gayton	3.0	2013	McNeese State (FCS Playoffs)
	Robert Gray	3.0	2013	McNeese State (FCS Playoffs)

== Kicking ==
=== Field goals made ===
Career
Rk	Player	FGs	Years
1	Gavin Hallford	49	2004 2005 2006 2007 2008
2	Alen Karajic	48	2020 2021 2022 2023
3	**Garrison Rippa**	37	2023 2024 2025
4	Slade Stinnett	36	1989 1990 1991 1992
	Griffin Thomas	36	2010 2011 2012 2013
	Cade Stinnett	36	2014 2015 2016 2017 2018
7	Chris Hobbs	32	1981 1982 1983 1984
8	Steven Lee	30	2001 2002 2003
	Joe Hix	30	1972 1973 1974 1975
10	Connor Rouleau	28	2013 2014 2015 2016
	Rocky Riddle	28	1976 1977 1978 1979

Single season
Rk	Player	FGs	Year
1	Griffin Thomas	24	2013
2	Gavin Hallford	22	2007
3	**Garrison Rippa**	21	2025
4	Connor Rouleau	17	2015
5	Alen Karajic	14	2020
	Alen Karajic	14	2023
	**Garrison Rippa**	14	2024
8	Joe Hix	13	1974
	James Esco	13	2010
	Cade Stinnett	13	2017
	Alen Karajic	13	2022

Single game
Rk	Player	FGs	Year	Opponent
1	Griffin Thomas	5	2013	North Alabama
2	Gavin Hallford	4	2007	Alabama State
	Gavin Hallford	4	2007	Chattanooga
	Gavin Hallford	4	2007	Murray State
	Alen Karajic	4	2020	Florida International
	Alen Karajic	4	2022	North Alabama
	**Garrison Rippa**	4<	2024	Eastern Michigan

=== Field goal percentage ===
Career
Rk	Player	FG%	Years
1	Bruce Peck	100.0%	1964 1965 1966 1967
2	Danny Kemp	93.3%	1970 1971
3	**Garrison Rippa**	75.5%	2023 2024 2025
4	James Esco	73.3%	2010 2011
5	Alen Karajic	71.6%	2020 2021 2022 2023
6	Shane Seamons	70.0%	1995 1996
7	Chris Hobbs	69.6%	1981 1982 1983 1984
8	Gavin Hallford	68.1%	2004 2005 2006 2007 2008
9	Griffin Thomas	67.9%	2010 2011 2012 2013
10	Cade Stinnett	66.7%	2014 2015 2016 2017 2018

Single season
Rk	Player	FG%	Year
1	Bruce Peck	100.0%	1965
2	James Esco	90.0%	2011
3	Alen Karajic	81.3%	2022
4	Rocky Riddle	80.0%	1976
	Lee Sutherland	80.0%	1995
6	Joe Hix	77.8%	1973
	Brad Hopkins	77.8%	1999
	Gavin Hallford	77.8%	2008
9	Gavin Hallford	75.9%	2007
10	Griffin Thomas	75.0%	2013
	**Garrison Rippa**	75.0%	2025
