= List of Jacksonville State Gamecocks football seasons =

This is a list of seasons completed by the Jacksonville State Gamecocks football team of the National Collegiate Athletic Association (NCAA) Division I Football Championship Subdivision (FCS). Jacksonville State's first football team was fielded in 1904.

Jacksonville State originally competed as a football independent. In 1970, Jacksonville State dropped down to NCAA Division II and joined the Gulf South Conference, where they won a national championship in 1992. The Gamecocks moved to the Division I-AA's Southland Conference in 1996, before joining the Ohio Valley Conference in 2003. On November 5, 2021, the school accepted an invitation to join Conference USA (C-USA) of the NCAA Division I Football Bowl Subdivision (FBS) beginning with the 2023 season.

== Seasons ==
Statistics correct as of the end of the 2024 college football season

NCAA Division I champions	NCAA Division I FCS champions	NCAA Division II champions	Conference champions	Division champions	Bowl Eligible	Undefeated Season

Year	NCAA Division	Conference	Conference Division	Overall					Conference						Coach	Final Ranking
Year	NCAA Division	Conference	Conference Division	Games	Wins	Losses	Ties	Pct.	Games	Wins	Losses	Ties	Pct.	Standing	Coach	Final Ranking
1904	N/A	Independent	N/A	5	1	4	0	.200	0	0	0	0	.000	N/A	C. A. Holton	-
1905	N/A	Independent	N/A	2	1	1	0	.500	0	0	0	0	.000	N/A	C. A. Holton	-
1906	No team															
1907	No team															
1908	N/A	Independent	N/A	7	4	3	0	.571	0	0	0	0	.000	N/A	Earl Wells	-
1909	N/A	Independent	N/A	2	0	2	0	.000	0	0	0	0	.000	N/A	F. A. Harwood	-
1910	N/A	Independent	N/A	6	1	3	2	.333	0	0	0	0	.000	N/A	George Penton	-
1911	N/A	Independent	N/A	6	3	2	1	.583	0	0	0	0	.000	N/A	Ben Harris	-
1912	N/A	Independent	N/A	5	1	4	0	.200	0	0	0	0	.000	N/A	Ben Harris	-
1913	N/A	Independent	N/A	8	5	2	1	.688	0	0	0	0	.000	N/A	Ben Harris	-
1914	N/A	Independent	N/A	4	3	1	0	.750	0	0	0	0	.000	N/A	Ben Harris	-
1915	N/A	Independent	N/A	7	5	2	0	.714	0	0	0	0	.000	N/A	Ben Harris	-
1916	N/A	Independent	N/A	7	2	4	1	.357	0	0	0	0	.000	N/A	Ben Harris	-
1917	N/A	Independent	N/A	10	9	0	1	.950	0	0	0	0	.000	N/A	Ben Harris	-
1918	N/A	Independent	N/A	4	1	2	1	.375	0	0	0	0	.000	N/A	Ben Harris	-
1919	N/A	Independent	N/A	8	3	4	1	.438	0	0	0	0	.000	N/A	Ben Harris	-
1920	N/A	Independent	N/A	9	7	1	1	.833	0	0	0	0	.000	N/A	J. W. Stephenson	-
1921	N/A	Independent	N/A	9	5	2	2	.667	0	0	0	0	.000	N/A	J. W. Stephenson	-
1922	N/A	Independent	N/A	8	4	4	0	.500	0	0	0	0	.000	N/A	C. C. Bush	-
1923	N/A	Independent	N/A	6	3	2	1	.583	0	0	0	0	.000	N/A	C. C. Bush	-
1924	N/A	Independent	N/A	9	6	3	0	.667	0	0	0	0	.000	N/A	C. C. Bush	-
1925	N/A	Independent	N/A	7	1	6	0	.143	0	0	0	0	.000	N/A	Earl Wren	-
1926	N/A	Independent	N/A	8	1	7	0	.125	0	0	0	0	.000	N/A	Al Clemens	-
1927	N/A	Independent	N/A	7	2	4	1	.357	0	0	0	0	.000	N/A	Al Clemens	-
1928	N/A	Independent	N/A	7	5	2	0	.714	0	0	0	0	.000	N/A	Al Clemens	-
1929	N/A	Independent	N/A	8	5	3	0	.625	0	0	0	0	.000	N/A	J. W. Stephenson	-
1930	N/A	Independent	N/A	8	4	3	1	.563	0	0	0	0	.000	N/A	J. W. Stephenson	-
1931	N/A	Independent	N/A	10	0	9	1	.050	0	0	0	0	.000	N/A	T. B. Shotts	-
1932	N/A	Independent	N/A	6	2	3	1	.417	0	0	0	0	.000	N/A	T. B. Shotts	-
1933	N/A	Independent	N/A	8	2	5	1	.313	0	0	0	0	.000	N/A	T. B. Shotts	-
1934	N/A	Independent	N/A	9	5	4	0	.556	0	0	0	0	.000	N/A	T. B. Shotts	-
1935	N/A	Independent	N/A	7	2	5	0	.286	0	0	0	0	.000	N/A	T. B. Shotts	-
1936	N/A	Independent	N/A	5	1	3	1	.300	0	0	0	0	.000	N/A	T. B. Shotts	-
1937	N/A	Independent	N/A	5	0	5	0	.000	0	0	0	0	.000	N/A	T. B. Shotts	-
1938	N/A	SIAA	N/A	8	1	6	1	.188	0	0	0	0	.000	N/A	Chet Dillon	-
1939	N/A	SIAA	N/A	9	0	7	2	.111	0	0	0	0	.000	N/A	Chet Dillon	-
1940	N/A	SIAA	N/A	8	3	5	0	.375	0	0	0	0	.000	N/A	Osmo Smith	-
1941	No team due to World War II															
1942	No team due to World War II															
1943	No team due to World War II															
1944	No team due to World War II															
1945	N/A	Alabama Intercollegiate Conference	N/A	2	1	1	0	.500	0	0	0	0	.000	N/A	Chet Dillon	-
1946	N/A	Alabama Intercollegiate Conference	N/A	9	3	5	1	.389	0	0	0	0	.000	N/A	Don Salls	-
1947	N/A	Alabama Intercollegiate Conference	N/A	9	9	0	0	1.000	0	0	0	0	.000	N/A	Don Salls	-
1948	N/A	Alabama Intercollegiate Conference	N/A	10	8	1	1	.850	0	0	0	0	.000	N/A	Don Salls	-
1949	N/A	Alabama Intercollegiate Conference	N/A	9	6	3	0	.667	0	0	0	0	.000	N/A	Don Salls	-
1950	N/A	Independent	N/A	9	6	2	1 (Note: The NCAA does not count pre-1960 Austin Peay games in official records, meaning this tie is not reflected in the official record.)	.722	0	0	0	0	.000	N/A	Don Salls	-
1951	N/A	Independent	N/A	8	3	3	2	.500	0	0	0	0	.000	N/A	Don Salls	-
1952	N/A	Independent	N/A	9	3	6	0	.333	0	0	0	0	.000	N/A	Don Salls	-
1953	N/A	Independent	N/A	9	3	5	1	.389	0	0	0	0	.000	N/A	Ray Wedgeworth	-
1954	N/A	Independent	N/A	10	7	2	1	.750	0	0	0	0	.000	N/A	Don Salls	-
1955	N/A	Independent	N/A	11	10	1	0	.909	0	0	0	0	.000	N/A	Don Salls	-
1956	N/A	Independent	N/A	8	5	3	0	.625	0	0	0	0	.000	N/A	Don Salls	-
1957	N/A	Independent	N/A	8	4	4	0	.500	0	0	0	0	.000	N/A	Don Salls	-
1958	N/A	Independent	N/A	9	5	4	0	.556	0	0	0	0	.000	N/A	Don Salls	-
1959	N/A	Independent	N/A	9	6	2	1	.722	0	0	0	0	.000	N/A	Don Salls	-
1960	N/A	Alabama Collegiate Conference	N/A	9	3	6	0	.333	0	0	0	0	.000	N/A	Don Salls	-
1961	N/A	Alabama Collegiate Conference	N/A	9	5	4	0	.556	0	0	0	0	.000	N/A	Don Salls	-
1962	N/A	Alabama Collegiate Conference	N/A	9	4	3	2	.556	0	0	0	0	.000	N/A	Don Salls	-
1963	N/A	Alabama Collegiate Conference	N/A	9	4	4	1	.500	0	0	0	0	.000	N/A	Don Salls	-
1964	N/A	Alabama Collegiate Conference	N/A	9	4	4	1	.500	0	0	0	0	.000	N/A	Don Salls	-
1965	N/A	Alabama Collegiate Conference	N/A	9	7	2	0	.778	0	0	0	0	.000	N/A	Jim Blevins	-
1966	N/A	Alabama Collegiate Conference	N/A	10	8	2	0	.800	0	0	0	0	.000	N/A	Jim Blevins	-
1967	N/A	Alabama Collegiate Conference	N/A	10	4	5	1	.450	0	0	0	0	.000	N/A	Jim Blevins	-
1968	N/A	Alabama Collegiate Conference	N/A	9	3	6	0	.333	0	0	0	0	.000	N/A	Jim Blevins	-
1969	N/A	Alabama Collegiate Conference	N/A	9	3	6	0	.333	0	0	0	0	.000	N/A	Charley Pell	-
1970	College	Mid-South	N/A	10	10	0	0	1.000	0	0	0	0	.000	N/A	Charley Pell	-
1971	College	Mid-South	N/A	9	6	3	0	.667	0	0	0	0	.000	N/A	Charley Pell	-
1972	College	Gulf South	N/A	10	7	2	1	.750	0	0	0	0	.000	N/A	Charley Pell	-
1973	II	Gulf South	N/A	9	7	2	0	.778	0	0	0	0	.000	N/A	Charley Pell	-
1974	II	Gulf South	N/A	11	7	4	0	.636	0	0	0	0	.000	N/A	Clarkie Mayfield	-
1975	II	Gulf South	N/A	10	7	3	0	.700	0	0	0	0	.000	N/A	Clarkie Mayfield	-
1976	II	Gulf South	N/A	10	6	4	0	.600	0	0	0	0	.000	N/A	Clarkie Mayfield	-
1977	II	Gulf South	N/A	14	11	3	0	.786	0	0	0	0	.000	N/A	Jim Fuller	-
1978	II	Gulf South	N/A	10	7	3	0	.700	0	0	0	0	.000	N/A	Jim Fuller	-
1979	II	Gulf South	N/A	10	4	6	0	.400	0	0	0	0	.000	N/A	Jim Fuller	-
1980	II	Gulf South	N/A	11	8	3	0	.727	0	0	0	0	.000	N/A	Jim Fuller	-
1981	II	Gulf South	N/A	11	8	3	0	.727	0	0	0	0	.000	N/A	Jim Fuller	-
1982	II	Gulf South	N/A	12	10	2	0	.833	0	0	0	0	.000	N/A	Jim Fuller	-
1983	II	Gulf South	N/A	11	6	5	0	.545	0	0	0	0	.000	N/A	Jim Fuller	-
1984	II	Gulf South	N/A	10	4	5	1	.450	0	0	0	0	.000	N/A	Joe Hollis	-
1985	II	Gulf South	N/A	10	3	6	1	.350	0	0	0	0	.000	N/A	Bill Burgess	-
1986	II	Gulf South	N/A	10	5	4	1	.550	0	0	0	0	.000	N/A	Bill Burgess	-
1987	II	Gulf South	N/A	10	5	4	1	.550	0	0	0	0	.000	N/A	Bill Burgess	-
1988	II	Gulf South	N/A	12	10	2	0	.833	0	0	0	0	.000	N/A	Bill Burgess	-
1989	II	Gulf South	N/A	14	13	1	0	.929	0	0	0	0	.000	N/A	Bill Burgess	-
1990	II	Gulf South	N/A	12	9	3	0	.750	0	0	0	0	.000	N/A	Bill Burgess	-
1991	II	Gulf South	N/A	13	12	1	0	.923	0	0	0	0	.000	N/A	Bill Burgess	-
1992	II	Gulf South	N/A	14	12	1	1	.893	0	0	0	0	.000	N/A	Bill Burgess	-
1993	II	Division II Independent	N/A	10	3	7	0	.300	0	0	0	0	.000	N/A	Bill Burgess	-
1994	II	Division II Independent	N/A	11	4	7	0	.364	0	0	0	0	.000	N/A	Bill Burgess	-
1995	II	Division II Independent	N/A	11	7	4	0	.636	0	0	0	0	.000	N/A	Bill Burgess	-
1996	I-AA	Southland	N/A	10	1	9	0	.100	3	0	3	0	.000	N/A	Bill Burgess	-
1997	I-AA	Southland	N/A	11	1	10	0	.091	7	1	6	0	.143	N/A	Mike Williams	-
1998	I-AA	Southland	N/A	11	7	4	0	.636	7	4	3	0	.571	N/A	Mike Williams	-
1999	I-AA	Southland	N/A	11	1	10	0	.091	7	1	6	0	.143	N/A	Mike Williams/Jeff Richards	-
2000	I-AA	Southland	N/A	10	4	6	0	.400	7	2	5	0	.286	N/A	Jack Crowe	-
2001	I-AA	Southland	N/A	11	5	6	0	.455	6	2	4	0	.333	N/A	Jack Crowe	-
2002	I-AA	Southland	N/A	11	5	6	0	.455	6	2	4	0	.333	N/A	Jack Crowe	-
2003	I-AA	OVC	N/A	12	8	4	0	.667	8	7	1	0	.875	N/A	Jack Crowe	-
2004	I-AA	OVC	N/A	11	9	2	0	.818	8	7	1	0	.875	N/A	Jack Crowe	-
2005	I-AA	OVC	N/A	11	6	5	0	.545	8	6	2	0	.750	N/A	Jack Crowe	-
2006	FCS	OVC	N/A	11	6	5	0	.545	8	5	3	0	.625	N/A	Jack Crowe	-
2007	FCS	OVC	N/A	11	6	5	0	.545	8	5	3	0	.625	N/A	Jack Crowe	-
2008	FCS	OVC	N/A	11	8	3	0	.727	7	5	2	0	.714	N/A	Jack Crowe	-
2009	FCS	OVC	N/A	11	8	3	0	.727	7	6	1	0	.857	1st	Jack Crowe	No. 16
2010	FCS	OVC	N/A	12	9	3	0	.750	8	6	2	0	.750	2nd	Jack Crowe	No. 12
2011	FCS	OVC	N/A	11	7	4	0	.636	8	6	2	0	.750	T-1st	Jack Crowe	-
2012	FCS	OVC	N/A	11	6	5	0	.545	8	5	3	0	.625	4th	Jack Crowe	-
2013	FCS	OVC	N/A	15	11	4	0	.733	8	5	3	0	.625	T-3rd	Bill Clark	No. 10
2014	FCS	OVC	N/A	12	10	2	0	.833	8	8	0	0	1.000	1st	John Grass	No. 9
2015	FCS	OVC	N/A	15	13	2	0	.867	8	8	0	0	1.000	1st	John Grass	No. 2
2016	FCS	OVC	N/A	12	10	2	0	.833	7	7	0	0	1.000	1st	John Grass	No. 6
2017	FCS	OVC	N/A	12	10	2	0	.833	8	8	0	0	1.000	1st	John Grass	No. 9
2018	FCS	OVC	N/A	13	9	4	0	.692	8	7	1	0	.875	1st	John Grass	No. 10
2019	FCS	OVC	N/A	12	6	6	0	.500	8	3	5	0	.375	6th	John Grass	-
2020	FCS	OVC	N/A	13	10	3	0	.857	7	6	1	0	.857	1st	John Grass	No. 8
2021	FCS	AQ7	N/A	11	5	6	0	.455	6	3	3	0	.500	5th	John Grass/Maxwell Thurmond	-
2022	FCS	ASUN	N/A	11	9	2	0	.818	5	5	0	0	1.000	1st	Rich Rodriguez	-
2023	FBS	C-USA	N/A	13	9	4	0	.692	8	6	2	0	.750	3rd	Rich Rodriguez	-
2024	FBS	C-USA	N/A	14	9	5	0	.643	8	7	1	0	.875	1st	Rich Rodriguez	-
2025	FBS	C-USA	N/A	13	8	5	0	.615	8	7	1	0	.875	T–1st	Charles Kelly	-
	Totals			1101	629	432	40	.589	218	150	68	0	.688			
