= 1983 Troy State Trojans football team =

American college football season

1983 Troy State Trojans football
- Conference: Gulf South Conference
- Record: 7–4 (4–3 GSC)
- Head coach: Chan Gailey (1st season)
- Offensive coordinator: Willie J. Slater (1st season)
- Defensive coordinator: Rick Rhoades (1st season)
- Home stadium: Veterans Memorial Stadium

1983 Gulf South Conference football standings
	Conf.					Overall
Team	W		L		T	W		L		T
No. 3 North Alabama $^	8	–	0	–	0	11	–	1	–	1
Mississippi College	4	–	3	–	0	8	–	3	–	0
Troy State	4	–	3	–	0	6	–	5	–	0
Livingston	4	–	4	–	0	6	–	4	–	0
Jacksonville State	4	–	4	–	0	6	–	5	–	0
Tennessee–Martin	3	–	4	–	0	4	–	7	–	0
Delta State	3	–	5	–	0	5	–	5	–	0
Valdosta State	2	–	5	–	0	5	–	6	–	0
West Georgia	1	–	5	–	0	4	–	6	–	0
$ – Conference champion; ^ – NCAA Division II playoff participant; Rankings from NCAA Division II Football Committee poll

The 1983 Troy State Trojans football team represented Troy State University (now known as Troy University) as a member of the Gulf South Conference (GSC) during the 1983 NCAA Division II football season. Led by first-year head coach Chan Gailey, the Trojans compiled an overall record of 7–4, with a mark of 4–3 in conference play, and finished tied for second in the GSC.

== Schedule ==
Date	Opponent	Rank	Site	Result	Attendance	Source
September 3	vs. Tuskegee*		Cramton Bowl; Montgomery, AL	W 33–6	6,500	
September 10	Nicholls State*		Veterans Memorial Stadium; Troy, AL	W 33–25	6,000	
September 17	Valdosta State		Veterans Memorial Stadium; Troy, AL	W 13–12	6,500	
September 24	at Georgia Southern*	No. 7	Womack Stadium; Statesboro, GA	W 28–27	7,378	
October 1	at No. 2 Mississippi College	No. T–6	Robinson Field; Clinton, MS	L 0–17	4,000	
October 8	Southeastern Louisiana*		Veterans Memorial Stadium; Troy, AL	L 15–34	4,000	
October 15	at Delta State		Delta Field; Cleveland, MS	W 26–21	5,500	
October 22	No. 6 North Alabama		Veterans Memorial Stadium; Troy, AL	L 21–42	8,500	
October 29	at Tennessee–Martin		Pacer Stadium; Martin, TN	L 14–17	6,500	
November 5	at Livingston		Tiger Stadium; Livingston, AL	W 35–22	5,500	
November 12	Jacksonville State		Veterans Memorial Stadium; Troy, AL (rivalry)	W 45–3	7,500	
*Non-conference game; Rankings from NCAA Division II Football Committee Poll released prior to the game
