= Joe Hollis =

American football and baseball coach (born 1947)

Biographical details
- Born: July 13, 1947 (age 79); Lawrenceburg, Tennessee, U.S.
- Education: Auburn University (1969)

Playing career

Baseball
- 1966–1969: Auburn
- Position: Catcher

Coaching career (HC unless noted)

Football
- 1970–1971: Coffee HS (AL) (assistant)
- 1972: Troy State (GA)
- 1973: Troy State (OB/WR)
- 1978: Auburn (GA)
- 1979: Auburn (OL)
- 1980 (spring): Auburn (DB)
- 1980: Tulsa (TE/OT)
- 1981–1982: Tulsa (OL)
- 1983: Tulsa (OC)
- 1984: Jacksonville State
- 1985–1990: Georgia (OL)
- 1991: Ohio State (OL)
- 1992–1996: Ohio State (OC)
- 1997–2001: Arkansas State
- 2004–2006: Florence HS (AL)

Baseball
- 1971–1972: Coffee HS (AL)
- 1972 (fall): Troy State (assistant)
- 1973–1974: Troy State
- 1976–1978: Troy State

Basketball
- 1976–1978: Troy State (assistant)

Administrative career (AD unless noted)
- 2000–2001: Arkansas State (interim AD)
- 2004–2007: Florence HS (AL)

Head coaching record
- Overall: 17–48–1 (college football); 106–75 (college baseball); 14–18 (high school football)

Accomplishments and honors

Awards
- Baseball; GSC Eastern Division Coach of the Year (1973)

Joe Hollis (born July 13, 1947) is an American former football and baseball coach. He served as the head football coach at Jacksonville State University in 1984 and at Arkansas State University from 1997 to 2001, compiling a career college football record of 17–48–1. Hollis was also the head baseball coach at Troy State University, now Troy University, from 1973 to 1974 and again from 1976 to 1978, tallying a mark of 106–75.

== Early life ==
Hollis grew up in Florence, Alabama, and graduated from Coffee High School in 1965. He played football, basketball, and baseball. On the football team he was a quarterback and was voted as team captain alongside leading the school to a state championship. He earned all-conference honors in all three sports. He accepted an athletic scholarship to play for Auburn University as a catcher. He graduated in 1969 with a bachelor's degree in physical education.

== Coaching career ==
=== Football ===
After graduating from Auburn, Hollis returned to his alma mater, Coffee High School, as the school's head baseball coach and an assistant football coach. He joined Troy State University—now known as Troy University—in 1973 as a graduate assistant on the football team as he pursued his master's degree in education. As a graduate assistant, he worked with the offensive backfield and wide receivers. After one season he was promoted to a full-time assistant. In his new role, Hollis was in charge of the offensive backs and wide receivers, which he had assistant with the previous year. He resigned in the spring of 1974.

In 1978, after four years away from coaching football, Hollis returned as a graduate assistant for his alma mater, Auburn. In 1979, he was promoted to offensive line coach. In the spring of 1980, he transitioned to defensive backs coach.

However, in March 1980, Hollis was hired by the University of Tulsa as the team's offensive tackles coach and tight ends coach. After one season he became the offensive line coach. He was promoted once again in 1983 and became the offensive coordinator. During Hollis's time alongside head coach John Cooper, the team went 32–12 and won five consecutive Missouri Valley Conference (MVC) championships including a 10–1 season in 1982.

With Cooper leaving for Arizona State, Hollis was hired as the head football coach for Jacksonville State University, where he replaced Jim Fuller who went 54–25 in seven seasons. The Gamecocks had gone 10–2 in 1982 before regressing down to a 6–5 record in Fuller's final season. In Hollis's first game as a head coach he faced another first-year head coach Ed Wyche of nonconference Alabama A&M. (Note: First year with Alabama A&M as it was Wyche's ninth-overall season as a head coach.) The game ended in a 6–6 tie. Despite finishing a tie, Hollis felt "generally optimistic about his team's chances in 1984." Following the game, Jacksonville State received a ranking of 17th in the NCAA Division II weekly coaches' poll. In week two, Jacksonville State played its home opener against nonconference opponent Middle Tennessee. Despite only throwing a total of 13 passes the previous week, Jacksonville State threw for 16 in the first half against the Blue Raiders and ultimately finished the 27–11 loss throwing 31 passes total. After beginning his rookie campaign with an 0–1–1, Hollis looked to bounce back against conference opponent West Georgia. Sophomore running back Hank Williams scored three touchdowns in a row to help lead the Gamecocks past the Braves to the tune of 24–15 in Hollis's first win as a head coach. In week four, the team traveled to Valdosta State where they rode the momentum from their previous win to defeat the Georgia team 12–5. The following week, the team faced Mississippi College for Jacksonville State's homecoming game. After back-to-back victories, Hollis dropped this game 28–0, ending a 38-year homecoming game win streak for the team in front of 9,500 fans. Against Delta State, the team led 21–0 at one point before almost allowing a devastating second half comeback to finish the game 27–26 over the Statesmen. After finishing the previous two games with less than 40 yards, Hollis attempted to regroup and put up a better rushing performance against fellow conference member North Alabama. Despite the attempt, Jacksonville State finished the 34–13 blowout loss with negative 50 total rushing yards against the Lions. The team did bounce back however, spoiling Tennessee–Martin's homecoming game to the tune of a 23–16 victory to improve the teams record to 4–3–1 overall and 3–2 in conference play. In the following week, Hollis faced off against his former team, #3 Troy State, in the Battle for the Ol' School Bell. Jacksonville State entered the fourth quarter of the game down 35–10, but managed to score 22 points in less than two-and-a-half minutes to cut the lead to 35–32. The team took a 39–35 lead with 6:43 remaining before allowing a ten-play 76-yard drive in the final four minutes to lose the rivalry game 42–39, allowing Troy State to win its first GSC championship since 1976. The Gamecocks and Hollis closed his rookie seasons with a 38–35 loss to Livingstone to bring his initial campaigns record to 4–5–1 and 4–4 in conference play.

After only one season, Hollis resigned from Jacksonville State to accepted the offensive line coach position for the University of Georgia under head coach Vince Dooley. Hollis filled the vacancy left by recently hired VMI head coach Eddie Williamson. After two seasons under new head coach overall, Ray Goff, and six seasons overall, Hollis, alongside assistant head coach and offensive coordinator George Haffner, mutually agreed to part ways from Georgia. In January 1991, Hollis rejoined John Cooper, who was now the head coach for Ohio State University, as his offensive line coach. After offensive coordinator Elliot Uzelac was hired by the Cleveland Browns of the National Football League (NFL), Hollis was promoted to the role.

After five, highly successful seasons with Ohio State, Hollis was hired as the head coach for Arkansas State University. He took over a team regarded as "the worst team in the United States of America" by Sports Illustrated. The team had only finished with one winning season in the previous ten seasons. His salary was $107,940. Part of Hollis's contract with the school was to allow for a larger spending limit for his assistants, including salary boosts for coordinators of over $30,000 from around $51,000 to $85,324.

=== Baseball ===
Hollis also initially served as an assistant baseball coach to Bob Boothe. He was promoted to head coach for the 1973 season. In his inaugural season, he led the team to its first winning record in more than four years at 15–12. He was also named Gulf South Conference Eastern Division Coach of the Year. He resigned after the 1974 season, following athletic director Tom Jones who resigned two weeks prior. In two seasons he led the team to a 35–25 record.

After two years out of coaching, Hollis returned to Troy State, again as the head baseball coach. He also served as an assistant basketball coach. He retained those positions until May 1978. He resigned after three more seasons as head baseball coach and led the team to an overall record of 106–75 in five seasons. In his final year, 1978, Hollis helped lead the team to the NCAA Division II South Central Region Tournament and an overall record of 31–8.

== Personal life ==
While not coaching in 1975, Hollis worked for a private business in his hometown of Florence.

== Head coaching record ==
=== College football ===
Year	Team	Overall	Conference	Standing	Bowl/playoffs
Jacksonville State Gamecocks (Gulf South Conference) (1984)
1984	Jacksonville State	4–5–1	4–4	5th	
Jacksonville State:		4–5–1	4–4		
Arkansas State Indians (NCAA Division I-A independent) (1997–1998)
1997	Arkansas State	2–9			
1998	Arkansas State	4–8			
Arkansas State Indians (Big West Conference) (1999–2000)
1999	Arkansas State	4–7	2–3	5th	
2000	Arkansas State	1–10	1–4	T–4th	
Arkansas State Indians (Sun Belt Conference) (2001)
2001	Arkansas State	2–9	2–4	T–4th	
Arkansas State:		13–43	5–11		
Total:		17–48–1			

=== College baseball ===
Record table
Season	Team	Overall	Conference	Standing	Postseason
Troy Trojans (Gulf South Conference) (1973–1974)
1973	Troy State	15–12	6–7		
1974	Troy State	20–13	9–5		
Troy Trojans (Gulf South Conference) (1976–1978)
1976	Troy State	19–19	10–6		
1977	Troy State	19–13	9–5		
1978	Troy State	33–18	8–5		
Troy State:		106–75	42–28		
Total:		106–75			

=== High school football ===
Year	Team	Overall	Conference	Standing	Bowl/playoffs
Florence Falcons () (2004–2006)
2004	Florence	3–7	2–4	5th	
2005	Florence	5–6	3–3	3rd	
2006	Florence	6–5	5–2	2nd	
Florence:		14–18	10–9		
Total:		14–18			
