= 1987 Troy State Trojans football team =

American college football season

1987 Troy State Trojans football

NCAA Division II champion GSC champion

NCAA Division II Championship, W 31–17 vs. Portland State
- Conference: Gulf South Conference
- Record: 12–1–1 (8–0 GSC)
- Head coach: Rick Rhoades (3rd season)
- Offensive coordinator: Willie J. Slater (2nd season)
- Offensive scheme: Wishbone
- Defensive coordinator: Robert Maddox (3rd season)
- Home stadium: Veterans Memorial Stadium

1987 Gulf South Conference football standings
	Conf.					Overall
Team	W		L		T	W		L		T
No. 4 Troy State $^	8	–	0	–	0	12	–	1	–	1
Mississippi College	5	–	3	–	0	6	–	5	–	0
North Alabama	4	–	3	–	1	7	–	3	–	1
Valdosta State	4	–	4	–	0	6	–	4	–	0
Delta State	3	–	4	–	1	6	–	4	–	1
Jacksonville State	3	–	4	–	1	5	–	4	–	1
Livingston	3	–	4	–	1	5	–	5	–	1
Tennessee–Martin	3	–	5	–	0	5	–	6	–	0
West Georgia	1	–	7	–	0	2	–	9	–	0
$ – Conference champion; ^ – NCAA Division II playoff participant; Rankings from NCAA Division II Football Committee poll

The 1987 Troy State Trojans football team represented Troy State University during the 1987 NCAA Division II football season, and completed the 67th season of Trojans football. The Trojans played their home games in at Veterans Memorial Stadium in Troy, Alabama. The 1987 team came off a 10–3 record from the previous season. The 1987 team was led by coach Rick Rhoades. The team finished the regular season with a 9–1–1 record and made the NCAA Division II playoffs. The Trojans defeated the Portland State Vikings 31–17 in the National Championship Game en route to the program's second NCAA Division II Football Championship and third overall national championship.

== Schedule ==
Date	Opponent	Rank	Site	TV	Result	Attendance	Source
September 5	at Southeast Missouri State*	No. 3	Houck Stadium; Cape Girardeau, MO		L 17–18	5,500	
September 12	Nicholls State*	No. 25	Veterans Memorial Stadium; Troy, AL		T 17–17	2,020	
September 19	West Texas State*	No. 24	Veterans Memorial Stadium; Troy, AL		W 45–0	6,100	
September 26	at Livingston	No. 24	Tiger Stadium; Livingston, AL		W 24–17	4,500	
October 3	West Georgia	No. 21	Veterans Memorial Stadium; Troy, AL		W 44–6	3,500	
October 10	at No. 7 Valdosta State	No. 18	Cleveland Field; Valdosta, GA		W 44–7	8,500	
October 17	Mississippi College	No. 12	Veterans Memorial Stadium; Troy, AL		W 48–21	8,000	
October 24	at Delta State	No. 11	Travis E. Parker Field; Cleveland, MS		W 38–6	2,750	
October 31	No. 8 North Alabama	No. 6	Veterans Memorial Stadium; Troy, AL		W 38–3	10,200	
November 7	at Tennessee–Martin	No. 6	Pacer Stadium; Martin, TN		W 31–21	6,800	
November 14	Jacksonville State	No. 4	Veterans Memorial Stadium; Troy, AL (Battle for the Ol' School Bell)		W 14–9	8,000	
November 28	No. 12 Winston–Salem State*	No. 4	Veterans Memorial Stadium; Troy, AL (NCAA Division II Quarterfinal)		W 45–14	3,000	
December 5	at No. 11 UCF*	No. 4	Florida Citrus Bowl; Orlando, FL (NCAA Division II Semifinal)		W 31–10	14,327	
December 12	vs. No. 3 Portland State*	No. 4	Braly Municipal Stadium; Florence, AL (NCAA Division II Championship)	ESPN	W 31–17	10,660	
*Non-conference game; Rankings from NCAA Division II Football Committee Poll released prior to the game
