= Montressa Kirby =

American football player (born 1976)

No. 8
- Position: Quarterback

Personal information
- Born: December 1, 1976 (age 49); Anniston, Alabama, U.S.
- Listed height: 6 ft 0 in (1.83 m)
- Listed weight: 198 lb (90 kg)

Career information
- High school: Anniston
- College: Jacksonville State (1995–1998)
- NFL draft: 1999: undrafted

Career history
- Hamilton Tiger-Cats (1999)

Awards and highlights
- Grey Cup champion (1999); Southland Offensive Player of the Year (1998)

Montressa Datone Kirby (born December 1, 1976) is an American former professional football quarterback who played for the Hamilton Tiger-Cats of the Canadian Football League (CFL). He played college football for the Jacksonville State Gamecocks.

== Early life ==
Montressa Datone Kirby was born on December 1, 1976, in Anniston, Alabama. He played high school football at Anniston High School. He threw for 1,900 yards and 20 touchdowns as a senior in 1994, helping Anniston win the class 6A state title while also earning first-team All-State honors.

== College career ==
Kirby enrolled at Jacksonville State University to play college football for the Gamecocks. He was a four-year letterman from 1995 to 1998, and a team co-captain in 1997 and 1998. 1995 was Jacksonville State's first season in Division I. As a true freshman in 1995, Kirby split time with JeDarius Isaac. On September 6, 1997, against Southwest Missouri State, Kirby completed 28 of 48 passes for 417 yards and five touchdowns, setting single-game school records in all four categories. He finished the 1997 season with school records in completions (218), passing attempts (418), and passing yards (2,817), earning All-Southland Football League honors.

Kirby earned Southland Offensive Player of the Year honors in 1998 after completing 168 of 318 passes for 2,271 yards and 15 touchdowns while also rushing for 310 yards and seven touchdowns. He was also named an All-American in 1998. He finished his college career as Jacksonville State's all-time leader in total offense with 7,688 yards. Kirby was inducted into the school's athletics hall of fame in 2015.

== Professional career ==
After going undrafted in the 1999 NFL draft, Kirby signed with the Hamilton Tiger-Cats of the Canadian Football League (CFL) on March 24, 1999. He was the third-string quarterback during the 1999 CFL season. He dressed in all 18 games, completing two of eight passes for 16 yards and one interception while also rushing five times for 45 yards. On November 28, 1999, the Tiger-Cats won the 87th Grey Cup against the Calgary Stampeders by a score of 32–21. In May 2000, Kirby hurt his shoulder throwing at home. He failed his physical in June 2000 and was released.

== Coaching career ==
Kirby was an assistant football coach at Jacksonville State from 2002 to 2005.

== See also ==
- Jacksonville State Gamecocks football statistical leaders
