= 1981 Troy State Trojans football team =

American college football season

1981 Troy State Trojans football
- Conference: Gulf South Conference
- Record: 3–7 (1–5 GSC)
- Head coach: Charlie Bradshaw (6th season)
- Home stadium: Veterans Memorial Stadium

1981 Gulf South Conference football standings
	Conf.					Overall
Team	W		L		T	W		L		T
No. 5 Jacksonville State $^	6	–	0	–	0	8	–	3	–	0
No. T–10 North Alabama	4	–	2	–	0	8	–	2	–	0
Livingston	4	–	2	–	0	6	–	3	–	0
Mississippi College	3	–	3	–	0	6	–	4	–	0
Tennessee–Martin	3	–	3	–	0	4	–	7	–	0
Troy State	1	–	5	–	0	3	–	7	–	0
Delta State	0	–	6	–	0	3	–	7	–	0
$ – Conference champion; ^ – NCAA Division II playoff participant; Rankings from NCAA Division II Football Committee poll

The 1981 Troy State Trojans football team represented Troy State University (now known as Troy University) as a member of the Gulf South Conference (GSC) during the 1981 NCAA Division II football season. Led by sixth-year head coach Charlie Bradshaw, the Trojans compiled an overall record of 3–7, with a mark of 1–5 in conference play, and finished sixth in the GSC.

== Schedule ==
Date	Opponent	Site	Result	Attendance	Source
September 12	at Tennessee–Martin	Pacer Stadium; Martin, TN	L 7–19	6,000	
September 19	Albany State*	Rip Hewes Stadium; Dothan, AL	W 43–0	6,500	
September 26	Nicholls State*	Veterans Memorial Stadium; Troy, AL	W 26–23	7,500	
October 3	at Mississippi College	Robinson Field; Clinton, MS	L 13–19	3,200	
October 10	Southeastern Louisiana*	Veterans Memorial Stadium; Troy, AL	L 21–22	6,000	
October 17	at Delta State	Delta Field; Cleveland, MS	W 7–0	1,714	
October 24	North Alabama	Veterans Memorial Stadium; Troy, AL	L 13–24	8,300	
October 31	at Tennessee Tech*	Tucker Stadium; Cookeville, TN	L 28–37	4,360	
November 7	at Livingston	Tiger Stadium; Livingston, AL	L 0–17	5,000	
November 14	No. 6 Jacksonville State	Veterans Memorial Stadium; Troy, AL (rivalry)	L 24–31	6,000	
*Non-conference game; Rankings from NCAA Division II Football Committee Poll released prior to the game
