= 1984 Jacksonville State Gamecocks football team =

American college football season

1984 Jacksonville State Gamecocks football
- Conference: Gulf South Conference
- Record: 4–5–1 (4–4 GSC)
- Head coach: Joe Hollis (1st season)
- Offensive coordinator: Britt Williams (1st season)
- Defensive coordinator: Jim Collins (1st season)
- Home stadium: Paul Snow Stadium

1984 Gulf South Conference football standings
	Conf.					Overall
Team	W		L		T	W		L		T
No. T–3 Troy State $^	7	–	1	–	0	12	–	1	–	0
No. 10 Mississippi College	5	–	2	–	1	6	–	2	–	1
North Alabama	4	–	1	–	3	7	–	1	–	3
Delta State	5	–	2	–	1	7	–	3	–	1
Jacksonville State	4	–	4	–	0	4	–	5	–	1
Livingston	3	–	5	–	0	5	–	5	–	0
Valdosta State	3	–	5	–	0	5	–	6	–	0
Tennessee–Martin	1	–	6	–	1	2	–	8	–	1
West Georgia	1	–	7	–	0	3	–	8	–	0
$ – Conference champion; ^ – NCAA Division II playoff participant; Rankings from NCAA Division II Football Committee poll

The 1984 Jacksonville State Gamecocks football team represented Jacksonville State University as a member of the Gulf South Conference (GSC) during the 1984 NCAA Division II football season. Led by first-year head coach Joe Hollis, the Gamecocks compiled an overall record of 4–5–1 with a mark of 4–4 in conference play, and finished fifth in the GSC. Hollis was hired as the Gamecocks' head coach in January 1984, and resigned a year later after only a single season to become offensive line coach at Georgia.

== Schedule ==
Date	Opponent	Site	Result	Attendance	Source
September 8	at Alabama A&M*	Milton Frank Stadium; Huntsville, AL	T 6–6	8,500	
September 15	Middle Tennessee*	Paul Snow Stadium; Jacksonville, AL	L 11–27	8,200	
September 22	West Georgia	Paul Snow Stadium; Jacksonville, AL	W 24–15	8,500	
September 29	at Valdosta State	Cleveland Field; Valdosta, GA	W 12–5	8,000	
October 6	Mississippi College	Paul Snow Stadium; Jacksonville, AL	L 0–28	9,500	
October 13	at Delta State	Delta Field; Cleveland, MS	W 27–26	3,500	
October 20	North Alabama	Paul Snow Stadium; Jacksonville, AL	L 13–34	8,000	
October 27	at Tennessee–Martin	Pacer Stadium; Martin, TN	W 23–16	6,500	
November 10	No. 3 Troy State	Paul Snow Stadium; Jacksonville, AL (rivalry)	L 39–42	4,000	
November 17	at Livingston	Tiger Stadium; Livingston, AL	L 35–38	3,000	
*Non-conference game; Rankings from NCAA Division II Football Committee Poll released prior to the game
