= Eli Jenkins (American football) =

American gridiron football player (born 1994)

Profile
- Position: Quarterback

Personal information
- Born: August 7, 1994 (age 32); Birmingham, Alabama, U.S.
- Listed height: 6 ft 2 in (1.88 m)
- Listed weight: 210 lb (95 kg)

Career information
- High school: Parker (AL)
- College: Jacksonville State
- NFL draft: 2017: undrafted

Career history
- Los Angeles Chargers (2017)*; Edmonton Eskimos (2018)*; Birmingham Iron (2019)*
- * Offseason or practice squad member only

Awards and highlights
- FCS Player of the Year (2015)

Eli Jenkins (born August 7, 1994) is an American former football quarterback.

== Early life ==
Jenkins attended A. H. Parker High School in Birmingham, Alabama. He committed to play college football at Jacksonville State University.

== College career ==
After redshirting as a freshman in 2012, Jenkins became the starting quarterback for the Jacksonville State Gamecocks football team, a position that he would remain in for the next four years. Jenkins led the Gamecocks to four consecutive FCS playoff appearances from 2013 to 2016, three consecutive Ohio Valley Conference championships from 2014 to 2016, and an appearance in the 2015 FCS Championship Game against North Dakota State.

== Professional career ==
Following the 2017 NFL draft, Jenkins signed as an undrafted free agent with the Los Angeles Chargers. Following the Chargers' trade with the Buffalo Bills to acquire Cardale Jones, Jenkins was released by the Chargers. He signed with the Edmonton Eskimos on December 11, 2017. He was released by the Eskimos on June 4, 2018.

In 2018, Jenkins signed for the Birmingham Iron of the Alliance of American Football (AAF) for the 2019 season. However, he was not selected in the 2019 AAF QB Draft.
