= 1988 Jacksonville State Gamecocks football team =

American college football season

1988 Jacksonville State Gamecocks football

GSC co-champion

NCAA Division II Quarterfinal, L 13–20 at Portland State
- Conference: Gulf South Conference
- Record: 10–2 (7–1 GSC)
- Head coach: Bill Burgess (4th season)
- Offensive coordinator: Charles Maniscalco (4th season)
- Defensive coordinator: Eddie Garfinkle (3rd season)
- Home stadium: Paul Snow Stadium

1988 Gulf South Conference football standings
	Conf.					Overall
Team	W		L		T	W		L		T
No. 9 Tennessee–Martin +^	7	–	1	–	0	11	–	2	–	0
No. 7 Jacksonville State +^	7	–	1	–	0	10	–	2	–	0
No. 6 Mississippi College +^	7	–	1	–	0	9	–	3	–	0
Valdosta State	4	–	3	–	1	6	–	3	–	1
Troy State	3	–	5	–	0	4	–	6	–	0
West Georgia	3	–	5	–	0	4	–	6	–	0
Delta State	2	–	5	–	1	4	–	6	–	1
North Alabama	2	–	6	–	0	2	–	8	–	0
Livingston	0	–	8	–	0	0	–	11	–	0
+ – Conference co-champions; ^ – NCAA Division II playoff participant; Rankings from NCAA Division II Football Committee poll

The 1988 Jacksonville State Gamecocks football team represented Jacksonville State University as a member of the Gulf South Conference (GSC) during the 1988 NCAA Division II football season. Led by fourth-year head coach Bill Burgess, the Gamecocks compiled an overall record of 10–2 with a mark of 7–1 in conference play, sharing the GSC title with Mississippi College and Tennessee–Martin. Jacksonville State advanced to the NCAA Division II Football Championship played, beating West Chester in the first round before losing to Portland State in the quarterfinal.

== Schedule ==
Date	Opponent	Rank	Site	Result	Attendance	Source
September 3	Samford*		Paul Snow Stadium; Jacksonville, AL (rivalry)	W 36–6	7,000	
September 10	at Alabama A&M*		Milton Frank Stadium; Huntsville, AL	W 24–14	10,000	
September 17	West Georgia		Paul Snow Stadium; Jacksonville, AL	W 30–0	12,000	
September 24	at Valdosta State		Cleveland Field; Valdosta, GA	W 31–21	2,000	
October 1	No. 19 Mississippi College	No. 9	Paul Snow Stadium; Jacksonville, AL	W 10–0	10,500	
October 8	at Delta State	No. 6	Delta Field; Cleveland, MS	W 24–17	2,650	
October 15	North Alabama	No. 3	Paul Snow Stadium; Jacksonville, AL	W 38–3	14,000	
October 22	at No. 14 Tennessee–Martin	No. 3	Pacer Stadium; Martin, TN	L 24–31	7,000	
November 5	Troy State	No. 7	Paul Snow Stadium; Jacksonville, AL (rivalry)	W 31–3	15,350	
November 12	at Livingston	No. 7	Paul Snow Stadium; Jacksonville, AL	W 45–10	3,300	
November 19	No. 2 West Chester*	No. 7	Paul Snow Stadium; Jacksonville, AL (NCAA Division II First Round)	W 63–24	7,000	
November 26	at No. 4 Portland State*	No. 7	Civic Stadium; Portland, OR (NCAA Division II Quarterfinal)	L 13–20	13,210	
*Non-conference game; Rankings from NCAA Division II Football Committee Poll released prior to the game
