= Earl Wren =

American football player and coach (1893–1932)

Biographical details
- Born: September 19, 1893
- Died: August 11, 1932 (aged 38)

Playing career
- 1915–1916: Auburn
- Position: Fullback

Coaching career (HC unless noted)
- 1920: Jacksonville HS (AL)
- 1921: Talladega HS (AL)
- 1922–1924: Jacksonville HS (AL)
- 1925: Jacksonville Normal
- 1926–1929: Alabama Deaf

Head coaching record
- Overall: 1–6 (college)

Edward Rueben "Earl" Wren (September 19, 1893 – August 11, 1932) was an American football player and coach. He served as the head football coach at Jacksonville State Normal School—now known as Jacksonville State University—in 1925, compiling a record of 1–6. Wren played college football at Auburn University from 1915 to 1916 and was awarded the Distinguished Service Cross for his service in World War I. Before and after his time at Jacksonville State, he served as a high school football coach at a number of schools in the state of Alabama.
