= Josh Pearson =

American gridiron football player (born 1997)

Profile
- Position: Wide receiver

Personal information
- Born: June 13, 1997 (age 29); Decatur, Alabama, U.S.
- Listed height: 6 ft 4 in (1.93 m)
- Listed weight: 205 lb (93 kg)

Career information
- High school: Austin (Decatur, Alabama)
- College: Jacksonville State
- NFL draft: 2020: undrafted

Career history
- Tampa Bay Buccaneers (2020–2021); BC Lions (2022–2023)

Awards and highlights
- Super Bowl champion (LV)
- Stats at Pro Football Reference
- Stats at CFL.ca

Josh Pearson (born June 13, 1997) is an American professional football wide receiver.

== College career ==
Pearson played college football for the Jacksonville State Gamecocks from 2017 to 2019.

== Professional career ==
=== Tampa Bay Buccaneers ===
Pearson was signed by the Tampa Bay Buccaneers as an undrafted free agent on May 4, 2020. He was waived on September 5, 2020, during final roster cuts, but was signed to the team's practice squad the following day. He was elevated to the active roster on October 8 for the team's week 5 game against the Chicago Bears, and reverted to the practice squad after the game. He was released on December 21, 2020, and re-signed to the practice squad two days later. On February 9, 2021, Pearson re-signed with the Buccaneers. He was waived on August 15, 2021.

=== BC Lions ===
On January 13, 2022, Pearson signed with BC Lions. Following training camp, he was placed on the injured list, but then made his CFL debut in the team's third game of the 2022 season, on June 30, 2022, against the Ottawa Redblacks, where he had one catch for seven yards. In the following game, he scored his first touchdown on a 66-yard pass from Nathan Rourke on July 9, 2022, against the Winnipeg Blue Bombers. Following this game, he was transferred to the injured list. While on the injured list, he was the anthem singer for the team's game on September 24, 2022, against the Calgary Stampeders. On May 3, 2023, Pearson retired from professional football. On June 4, 2023, Pearson came out of retirement and was sent to the Lions practice roster. He was released on November 13, 2023.

== Personal life ==
Pearson was born to parents Kristie Carter and Harold Pearson and has four siblings, Jacob, Christy, Shell, Akeli.
