= Ryan Perrilloux =

American football player (born 1987)

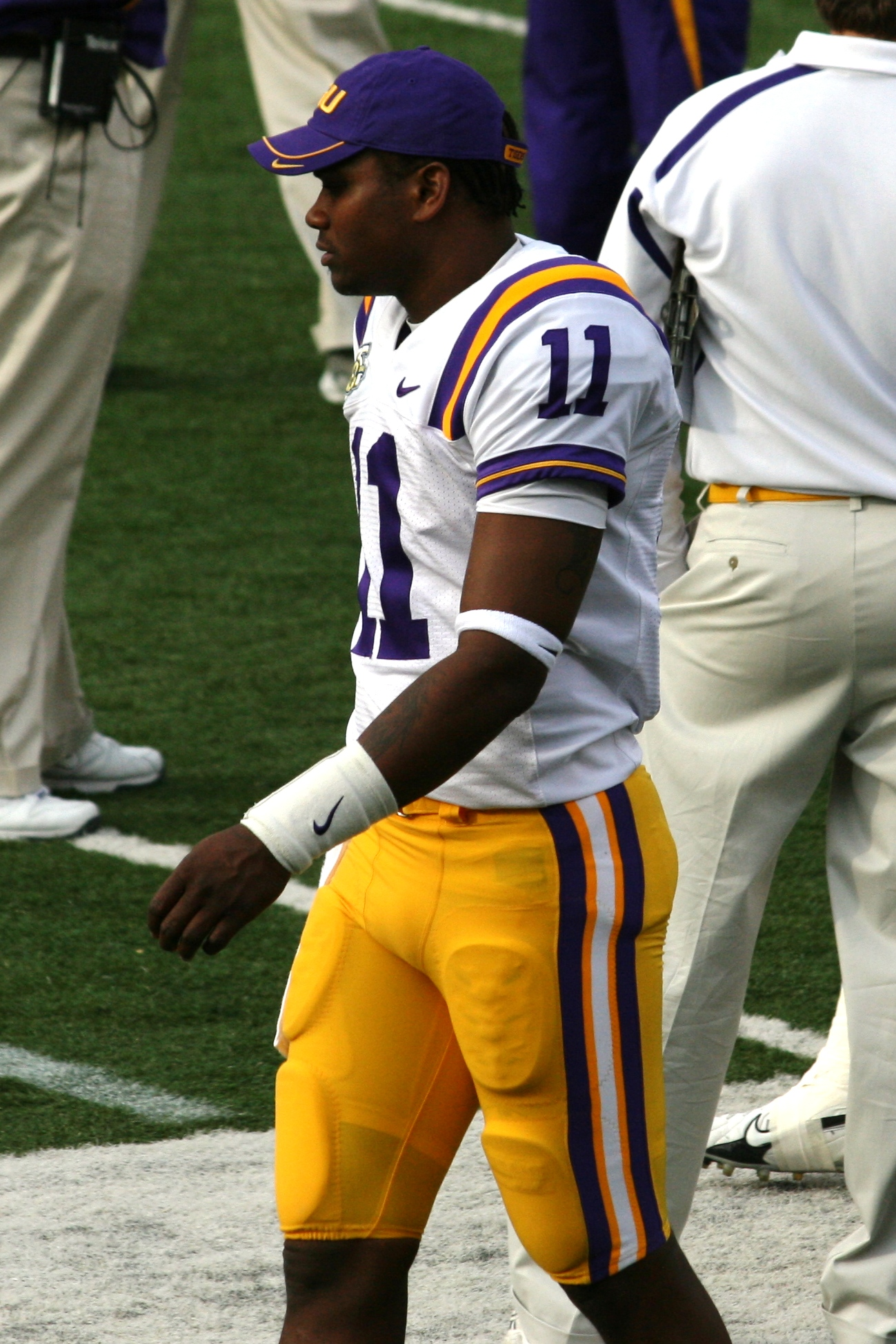
- Perrilloux with the LSU Tigers in 2007

No. 17, 11
- Position: Quarterback

Personal information
- Born: January 1, 1987 (age 39); LaPlace, Louisiana, U.S.
- Listed height: 6 ft 3 in (1.91 m)
- Listed weight: 204 lb (93 kg)

Career information
- High school: East St. John (Reserve, Louisiana)
- College: LSU (2005–2007); Jacksonville State (2008–2009)
- NFL draft: 2010: undrafted

Career history
- Hartford Colonials (2010); New York Giants (2011)*; Florida Tarpons (2013); Calgary Stampeders (2013); New Orleans VooDoo (2014); Aix-en-Provence Argonautes (2016)
- * Offseason or practice squad member only

Awards and highlights
- BCS national champion (2008)

Career AFL statistics
- Comp. / Att.: 74 / 140
- Passing yards: 936
- TD–INT: 13–12
- Passer rating: 61.49
- Rushing touchdowns: 9
- Stats at ArenaFan.com
- Stats at Pro Football Reference

Ryan Anthony Perrilloux (born January 1, 1987) is an American former football quarterback. He played college football at LSU and Jacksonville State.

== Early life ==
Perrilloux had one of the most dominating prep careers in state history at East St. John High School in Reserve, Louisiana, totaling 12,705 yards of offense (9,025 passing; 3,680 rushing), which ranks second all-time for total offense. His 9,025 passing are fourth on the state's all-time passing list. In his four years at East St. John, Perrilloux had a total of 155 touchdowns (84 passing, 71 rushing). He racked up a Louisiana high school record 5,006 total yards of offense as a senior, including 3,546 yards passing and 1,460 yards rushing. In his final high school game in the state playoffs versus Evangel Christian Academy, Perrilloux accounted for 495 yards of offense.

Perrilloux was considered the top quarterback prospect of the 2005 high school class alongside Mark Sanchez of Mission Viejo High School. Some recruiting experts called him the most dangerous offensive weapon in the nation, noting his strong arm, quick release and pinpoint accuracy. He won the 2004 Hall Trophy as the nation's most outstanding high school football player and was named "Offensive Player of the Year" by USA Today. He was also named National Offensive Player of the Year by the Touchdown Club of Columbus, Ohio, Louisiana's Mr. Football and Louisiana Gatorade Player of the Year as well as a PARADE All-American. Perrilloux was invited to the Elite 11 Quarterback Camp as well as to the U.S. Army All-American Bowl.

A three-sport athlete at East St. John, Perrilloux also played small forward for the basketball team and centerfield for the baseball team. He played his last basketball game at Fortier High School.

=== Recruitment ===
As one of the nation's top football prospects, Perrilloux was heavily recruited during his high school career. Louisiana State University and the University of Texas at Austin quickly emerged as the frontrunners for his commitment. On July 26, 2004, Perrilloux verbally committed to Texas, pairing with Colt McCoy as Texas's quarterback recruit. Texas head coach Mack Brown had not been able to recruit quarterbacks in his past two recruiting classes, since some of the best Texas prep QBs – like Rhett Bomar and Kirby Freeman – committed to out-of-state colleges, which is why Brown was particularly interested in signing Perrilloux. After remaining committed to Texas up to signing day, Perrilloux caved to local pressure and publicly announced he would attend Louisiana State to much pomp and circumstance. New LSU head coach Les Miles had only had the job for a few weeks, and Perrilloux was considered the cornerstone of a relatively small recruiting class. Perrilloux held a news conference on signing day and proclaimed he would win the Heisman Trophy as a true freshman. A reporter asked him, "What about Jamarcus Russell?" Russell was the current LSU starting QB at the time. Perrilloux made the famous quip "Jamarcus Who?"

== College career ==
=== LSU ===
==== Freshman season ====
Despite claims of competing for the Heisman Trophy as a true freshman, Perrilloux redshirted the 2005 season in order to learn the complex Jimbo Fisher offense.

As the third-string quarterback for the 2006 Tigers behind juniors JaMarcus Russell and Matt Flynn, Perrilloux saw only limited playing time in 2006. In a game versus Louisiana-Lafayette on September 2, he completed his only pass of the 2006 season.

It was reported by a Baton Rouge TV station on May 23, 2006, that Perrilloux desired to transfer to a junior college or Grambling State University. The story was quickly refuted by Perrilloux and his family, as well as LSU coach Les Miles.

The Times-Picayune reported on January 11, 2007, that Perrilloux was a "person of interest" in a Federal investigation being conducted in New Orleans, Louisiana. However, Federal representatives could neither confirm nor deny this story. Although he had not been accused of any crime, Perrilloux retained the services of Baton Rouge attorney Nathan Fisher.

==== Sophomore season ====
On May 22, 2007, LSU head coach Les Miles suspended Perrilloux from the football team indefinitely after the player was issued a misdemeanor summons by police when he allegedly tried to use his brother's driver's license to get onto the Hollywood Casino gambling boat. Further, Miles told reporters they would not be permitted to talk to Perrilloux until he did something in a game that was worth discussing. However, Miles reinstated Perrilloux in time for preseason practice. Perrilloux was one of the candidates to replace JaMarcus Russell as LSU starting quarterback, but lost out to the more experienced Matt Flynn, a senior.

On September 15, Perrilloux had his first start at quarterback for LSU, because Miles decided to rest regular starter Matt Flynn, who had sprained his right ankle a week earlier and whose participation in practice had been limited since. In a 44–0 rout against Middle Tennessee Perrilloux threw for 298 yards and three touchdowns, while completing 20 of 25 attempts.

On October 25, Perrilloux, teammate Derrick Odom and others were involved in a fight at The Varsity, a Baton Rouge nightclub. On October 31, 2007, Odom and Jeremy Benton were dismissed from the team. Perrilloux remained on the squad, but was suspended for LSU's game against Alabama. Perrilloux was not charged at the conclusion of the investigation.

On December 1, Perrilloux made his second start, this time in the SEC Championship Game versus Tennessee, replacing an injured Matt Flynn. He completed 20 of 30 passes for 243 yards, one touchdown, and one interception. He also scored on a two-point conversion run. Perrilloux led the Tigers to a 21–14 win over the Volunteers, and was named the player of the game by CBS Sports. The victory helped propel the Tigers to the BCS National Championship Game against Ohio State, after #1 Missouri and #2 West Virginia lost later that night. It was the second time since 2001 that a backup quarterback led LSU to the SEC Championship Game victory (Matt Mauck did it in 2001 versus Tennessee). He finished the season with 694 passing yards, eight touchdowns, and two interceptions.

==== Suspension and dismissal ====
On February 18, 2008, Coach Miles indefinitely suspended Perrilloux for violating team rules. The rules which he violated are unknown, but an LSU associate athletic director stated "it's nothing outside the football program". The New Orleans Times-Picayune reported that Perrilloux's transgressions included missing classes, workouts and at least one team meeting.

On May 2, 2008, LSU head coach Les Miles kicked Perrilloux off the team for "not fulfilling his obligation" as an LSU student-athlete. He is reported to have a failed a drug test due to marijuana, missed a team meeting, skipped classes and was late for a handful of conditioning workouts.

=== Jacksonville State ===
On May 14, 2008, Perrilloux transferred to Jacksonville State University and was eligible to play immediately. He played his first game with Jacksonville State against Georgia Tech on August 28, 2008, in the starting quarterback position. Jacksonville State lost that game 41–14.

After an opening loss to Georgia Tech, Perrilloux led JSU to an 8–3 season, completing 174 of 276 passes for 2,199 yards and 19 touchdowns. He was also named OVC Newcomer of the Week and OVC Offensive Player of the Week during the season.

On January 13, 2009, Perrilloux announced that he would return for his senior season after being told by the NFL Advisory Board that he would not likely be drafted in the first three rounds.

Perrilloux was suspended again at the beginning of the 2009 season for violating undisclosed team rules. However, through the next five games of the 2009 season, Perrilloux had the best passer rating of all eligible quarterbacks in D1-AA (FCS) and D1-A with a 199.22 rating, having thrown for 961 yards, 12 Touchdowns and 1 interception. He had also rushed for 125 yards and three more scores on 40 attempts. Jacksonville State coach Jack Crowe said earlier that year, following Perrilloux's suspension, "We have not made a different set of rules for Ryan," Crowe said. "He has the same consequences as any one of our players and there is very little room for error. I do not think this is a reflection of his accountability since he has been here. Our fans do not need to assume more than it is, which is a team rule. Since the incident, Ryan has demonstrated his responsibility to this team and this university. I expect this to just be a one-time incident."

Perilloux was named Ohio Valley Conference Offensive Player of the Year in 2009.

=== Statistics ===
Season	Team	Passing							Rushing			
Season	Team	Cmp	Att	Pct	Yds	TD	Int	Rtg	Att	Yds	Avg	TD
2006	LSU	1	4	25.0	10	0	0	46.0	3	13	4.3	0
2007	LSU	51	75	68.0	694	8	2	175.6	52	207	4.0	2
2008	Jacksonville State	187	297	63.0	2,318	19	13	140.9	117	368	3.1	7
2009	Jacksonville State	138	236	58.5	2,350	23	2	172.6	98	443	4.5	8
Totals		377	612	61.6	5,372	50	17	156.7	270	1,031	3.8	17

== Professional career ==
Pre-draft measurables
Height	Weight	40-yard dash	10-yard split	20-yard split	20-yard shuttle	Three-cone drill	Vertical jump	Broad jump
6 ft 2 1/8 in (1.88 m)	226 lb (103 kg)	4.80 s	1.68 s	2.75 s	4.51 s	7.30 s	29.5 in (0.75 m)	9 ft 3 in (2.82 m)
All values from Pro Day

After going undrafted in the 2010 NFL draft, the Minnesota Vikings invited Perrilloux for a tryout, but did not sign him. He signed and played for the Hartford Colonials of the United Football League in 2010. On January 13, 2011, Perrilloux was signed to a reserve/future contract with the New York Giants. On September 3, 2011, he was cut from the Giants' roster. He was re-signed the same day to the practice squad. He was either waived or re-signed to the practice squad 22 times overall during the 2011 season. Perrilloux was released on February 1, 2012, four days before Super Bowl XLVI. However, he reportedly still travelled with the team to the Super Bowl. He was re-signed by the Giants on February 8, 2012, three days after the team's Super Bowl victory. Perrilloux was released for the last time by New York during the final cut of the 2012 preseason.

Following his stint in the NFL, Perrilloux signed with the Florida Tarpons of the Ultimate Indoor Football League. On May 27, 2013, he signed with the Calgary Stampeders in the Canadian Football League and was released on September 5, 2013. On January 22, 2014, Perrilloux was assigned to the New Orleans VooDoo of the Arena Football League. He threw for 936 yards and thirteen touchdowns while also rushing for nine scores for the VooDoo in the 2014 season. In 2016, Perrilloux played for the Aix-en-Provence Argonautes in the Ligue Élite de Football Américain in France with the team reaching the league semifinal game. . In 2019, he was signed by the Baton Rouge RedSticks of the National Gridiron League (NGL), who were scheduled to begin league play in April 2020 before the season was postponed.
