= 1969 Jacksonville State Gamecocks football team =

American college football season

1969 Jacksonville State Gamecocks football
- Conference: Alabama Collegiate Conference
- Record: 3–6 (0–3 ACC)
- Head coach: Charley Pell (1st season)
- Home stadium: Paul Snow Stadium

The 1969 Jacksonville State Gamecocks football team represented Jacksonville State University as a member of the Alabama Collegiate Conference (ACC) during the 1969 NAIA football season. Led by first-year head coach Charley Pell, the Gamecocks compiled an overall record of 3–6 with a mark of 0–3 in conference play.

== Schedule ==
Date	Opponent	Site	Result	Source
September 20	Samford*	Paul Snow Stadium; Jacksonville, AL (rivalry)	W 20–10	
September 27	at Southeast Missouri State*	Houck Stadium; Cape Girardeau, MO	L 13–19	
October 4	Western Carolina*	Paul Snow Stadium; Jacksonville, AL	L 7–14	
October 11	Tennessee–Martin*	Paul Snow Stadium; Jacksonville, AL	W 22–20	
October 18	at Troy State	Veterans Memorial Stadium; Troy, AL (rivalry)	L 6–37	
October 25	at Northwestern State*	Demon Field; Natchitoches, LA	L 21–48	
November 8	Delta State*	Paul Snow Stadium; Jacksonville, AL	W 21–13	
November 15	at Livingston	Tiger Stadium; Livingston, AL	L 6–27	
November 22	at Florence State	Municipal Stadium; Florence, AL	L 18–23	
*Non-conference game
