= 1987 Jacksonville State Gamecocks football team =

American college football season

1987 Jacksonville State Gamecocks football
- Conference: Gulf South Conference
- Record: 5–4–1 (3–4–1 GSC)
- Head coach: Bill Burgess (3rd season)
- Offensive coordinator: Charles Maniscalco (3rd season)
- Defensive coordinator: Eddie Garfinkle (2nd season)
- Home stadium: Paul Snow Stadium

1987 Gulf South Conference football standings
	Conf.					Overall
Team	W		L		T	W		L		T
No. 4 Troy State $^	8	–	0	–	0	12	–	1	–	1
Mississippi College	5	–	3	–	0	6	–	5	–	0
North Alabama	4	–	3	–	1	7	–	3	–	1
Valdosta State	4	–	4	–	0	6	–	4	–	0
Delta State	3	–	4	–	1	6	–	4	–	1
Jacksonville State	3	–	4	–	1	5	–	4	–	1
Livingston	3	–	4	–	1	5	–	5	–	1
Tennessee–Martin	3	–	5	–	0	5	–	6	–	0
West Georgia	1	–	7	–	0	2	–	9	–	0
$ – Conference champion; ^ – NCAA Division II playoff participant; Rankings from NCAA Division II Football Committee poll

The 1987 Jacksonville State Gamecocks football team represented Jacksonville State University as a member of the Gulf South Conference (GSC) during the 1987 NCAA Division II football season. Led by third-year head coach Bill Burgess, the Gamecocks compiled an overall record of 5–4–1 with a mark of 3–4–1 in conference play, and finished tied for fifth in the GSC.

== Schedule ==
Date	Opponent	Site	Result	Attendance	Source
September 5	at Newberry*	Setzler Field; Newberry, SC	W 27–3	2,000	
September 12	Alabama A&M*	Paul Snow Stadium; Jacksonville, AL	W 26–13	9,000	
September 26	at West Georgia	Grisham Stadium; Carrollton, GA	W 17–6	6,800	
October 3	No. 7 Valdosta State	Paul Snow Stadium; Jacksonville, AL	L 10–27	13,000	
October 10	at Mississippi College	Robinson-Hale Stadium; Clinton, MS	L 13–15	5,000	
October 17	Delta State	Paul Snow Stadium; Jacksonville, AL	W 36–34	10,500	
October 24	at No. 7 North Alabama	Braly Municipal Stadium; Florence, AL	T 10–10	8,000	
October 31	Tennessee–Martin	Paul Snow Stadium; Jacksonville, AL	L 17–28	8,500	
November 14	at No. 4 Troy State	Veterans Memorial Stadium; Troy, AL (rivalry)	L 9–14	8,000	
November 21	Livingston	Paul Snow Stadium; Jacksonville, AL	W 25–19	5,000	
*Non-conference game; Rankings from NCAA Division II Football Committee Poll released prior to the game
