= 1968 Jacksonville State Gamecocks football team =

American college football season

1968 Jacksonville State Gamecocks football
- Conference: Alabama Collegiate Conference
- Record: 3–6 (0–3 ACC)
- Head coach: Jim Blevins (4th season)
- Home stadium: Paul Snow Stadium

The 1968 Jacksonville State Gamecocks football team represented Jacksonville State University as a member of the Alabama Collegiate Conference (ACC) during the 1968 NAIA football season. Led by fourth-year head coach Jim Blevins, the Gamecocks compiled an overall record of 3–6 with a mark of 0–3 in conference play.

== Schedule ==
Date	Opponent	Site	Result	Attendance	Source
September 21	at Samford*	Seibert Stadium; Homewood, AL (rivalry)	L 14–20		
September 28	Chattanooga*	Paul Snow Stadium; Jacksonville, AL	L 14–32	8,500	
October 12	at Tennessee–Martin*	Pacer Stadium; Martin, TN	W 16–12		
October 19	Troy State	Paul Snow Stadium; Jacksonville, AL (rivalry)	L 0–31		
October 26	Newberry*	Paul Snow Stadium; Jacksonville, AL	W 45–10		
November 2	at Louisiana College*	Alumni Stadium; Pineville, LA	W 45–21		
November 9	at Delta State*	Delta Field; Cleveland, MS	L 7–27		
November 16	Livingston	Paul Snow Stadium; Jacksonville, AL	L 0–7		
November 23	Florence State	Paul Snow Stadium; Jacksonville, AL	L 10–38		
*Non-conference game
