= 1983 Jacksonville State Gamecocks football team =

American college football season

1983 Jacksonville State Gamecocks football
- Conference: Gulf South Conference
- Record: 6–5 (4–4 GSC)
- Head coach: Jim Fuller (7th season)
- Defensive coordinator: Jim Tompkins (1st season)
- Home stadium: Paul Snow Stadium

1983 Gulf South Conference football standings
	Conf.					Overall
Team	W		L		T	W		L		T
No. 3 North Alabama $^	8	–	0	–	0	11	–	1	–	1
Mississippi College	4	–	3	–	0	8	–	3	–	0
Troy State	4	–	3	–	0	6	–	5	–	0
Livingston	4	–	4	–	0	6	–	4	–	0
Jacksonville State	4	–	4	–	0	6	–	5	–	0
Tennessee–Martin	3	–	4	–	0	4	–	7	–	0
Delta State	3	–	5	–	0	5	–	5	–	0
Valdosta State	2	–	5	–	0	5	–	6	–	0
West Georgia	1	–	5	–	0	4	–	6	–	0
$ – Conference champion; ^ – NCAA Division II playoff participant; Rankings from NCAA Division II Football Committee poll

The 1983 Jacksonville State Gamecocks football team represented Jacksonville State University as a member of the Gulf South Conference (GSC) during the 1983 NCAA Division II football season. Led by seventh-year head coach Jim Fuller, the Gamecocks compiled an overall record of 6–5 with a mark of 4–4 in conference play, and finished tied for fourth in the GSC.

== Schedule ==
Date	Opponent	Site	Result	Attendance	Source
September 3	at Chattanooga*	Chamberlain Field; Chattanooga, TN	L 6–13	10,254	
September 10	Alabama A&M*	Paul Snow Stadium; Jacksonville, AL	W 14–12	13,000	
September 24	at West Georgia	Grisham Stadium; Carrollton, GA	W 38–0	10,500	
October 1	Livingston	Paul Snow Stadium; Jacksonville, AL	L 7–16	8,500	
October 8	at No. 2 Mississippi College	Robinson Field; Clinton, MS	L 18–30	4,000	
October 15	at Valdosta State	Cleveland Field; Valdosta, GA	W 37–11	3,000	
October 22	Tuskegee*	Paul Snow Stadium; Jacksonville, AL	W 30–7	4,000	
October 29	at Delta State	Delta Field; Cleveland, MS	W 34–14	4,000	
November 5	Tennessee–Martin	Paul Snow Stadium; Jacksonville, AL	W 34–19	10,000	
November 12	at Troy State	Veterans Memorial Stadium; Troy, AL (rivalry)	L 3–45	7,500	
November 19	at No. 3 North Alabama	Braly Municipal Stadium; Florence, AL	L 21–24	7,500	
*Non-conference game; Rankings from NCAA Division II Football Committee Poll released prior to the game
