= Mark Word =

American football player (born 1975)

No. 67, 90
- Position: Defensive end

Personal information
- Born: November 23, 1975 (age 50); Miami, Florida, U.S.
- Listed height: 6 ft 6 in (1.98 m)

Career information
- High school: Miami Southridge
- College: Jacksonville State
- NFL draft: 1999: undrafted

Career history
- Kansas City Chiefs (1999); Hamilton Tiger-Cats (2000–2001); St. Louis Rams (2001)*; Cleveland Browns (2001–2003); Rhein Fire (2001); Oakland Raiders (2005)*; Montreal Alouettes (2005); Buffalo Bills (2006)*; Indianapolis Colts (2006)*; Tampa Bay Storm (2007–2008); Cleveland Gladiators (2008)
- * Offseason or practice squad member only

Career NFL statistics
- Tackles: 29
- Sacks: 12
- Stats at Pro Football Reference
- Stats at ArenaFan.com

Mark Bernard Word (born November 23, 1975) is an American former professional football player who was a defensive end for three seasons in the National Football League (NFL) with the Kansas City Chiefs and the Cleveland Browns. He played college football for the Jacksonville State Gamecocks.

== Professional career ==
=== 1999 ===
Word was signed by the Kansas City Chiefs as an undrafted free agent on April 27, 1999.

2000: Word was signed by the Hamilton Tiger-Cats of the CFL. He played 9 games and recorded 15 tackles and 3 sacks. He played one game in 2001 after returning from the NFL.

=== 2001 ===
The St. Louis Rams signed Word on February 2, 2001, and allocated him to NFL Europe on April 17. As a member of the Rhein Fire he recorded nine total tackles, five sacks, three forced fumbles and two passes defensed. He was waived by St. Louis on July 5.

Word was signed by the Cleveland Browns on July 20. He suffered a shoulder injury during training camp and was forced to spend the rest of the season on the injured reserve list.

In 2002, Word led the Browns with 8.0 sacks. The Browns finished 9-7 and made the playoff as a wildcard team that year.

2005: Word finished out his football career playing for the Montreal Alouettes of the CFL. He played seven regular season games and recorded 11 tackles and 2 sacks.
