= 1981 Jacksonville State Gamecocks football team =

American college football season

1981 Jacksonville State Gamecocks football

GSC champion

NCAA Division II First Round, L 22–38 at Southwest Texas State
- Conference: Gulf South Conference
- Record: 8–3 (6–0 GSC)
- Head coach: Jim Fuller (5th season)
- Offensive coordinator: Jack White (3rd season)
- Defensive coordinator: Jerry Beach (3rd season)
- Home stadium: Paul Snow Stadium

1981 Gulf South Conference football standings
	Conf.					Overall
Team	W		L		T	W		L		T
No. 5 Jacksonville State $^	6	–	0	–	0	8	–	3	–	0
No. T–10 North Alabama	4	–	2	–	0	8	–	2	–	0
Livingston	4	–	2	–	0	6	–	3	–	0
Mississippi College	3	–	3	–	0	6	–	4	–	0
Tennessee–Martin	3	–	3	–	0	4	–	7	–	0
Troy State	1	–	5	–	0	3	–	7	–	0
Delta State	0	–	6	–	0	3	–	7	–	0
$ – Conference champion; ^ – NCAA Division II playoff participant; Rankings from NCAA Division II Football Committee poll

The 1981 Jacksonville State Gamecocks football team represented Jacksonville State University as a member of the Gulf South Conference (GSC) during the 1981 NCAA Division II football season. Led by fifth-year head coach Jim Fuller, the Gamecocks compiled an overall record of 8–3 with a mark of 6–0 in conference play, and finished as GSC champion. In the playoffs, Jacksonville State were defeated by Southwest Texas State in the first round.

== Schedule ==
Date	Opponent	Rank	Site	Result	Attendance	Source
September 12	at Alabama State*		Cramton Bowl; Montgomery, AL	L 14–20	11,900	
September 19	Alabama A&M*		Paul Snow Stadium; Jacksonville, AL	W 20–9	14,000	
September 26	at Chattanooga*		Chamberlain Field; Chattanooga, TN	L 3–10	10,300	
October 3	Livingston		Paul Snow Stadium; Jacksonville, AL	W 48–29	12,000	
October 10	at Mississippi College		Robinson Field; Clinton, MS	W 40–0	4,000	
October 17	Liberty Baptist*	No. 10	Paul Snow Stadium; Jacksonville, AL	W 64–0	11,000–11,038	
October 31	at Delta State	No. 7	Delta Field; Cleveland, MS	W 28–14	1,600	
November 7	Tennessee–Martin	No. 7	Paul Snow Stadium; Jacksonville, AL	W 44–7	11,000	
November 14	at Troy State	No. 6	Veterans Memorial Stadium; Troy, AL (rivalry)	W 31–24	6,000	
November 21	at North Alabama	No. 5	Braly Municipal Stadium; Florence, AL	W 21–14	12,000	
November 28	at No. 4 Southwest Texas State*	No. 5	Bobcat Stadium; San Marcos, TX (NCAA Division II Quarterfinal)	L 22–38	8,000	
*Non-conference game; Rankings from NCAA Division II Football Committee Poll released prior to the game
