= Bill Burgess (American football) =

American football player and coach (1941–2023)

Biographical details
- Born: January 26, 1941
- Died: December 13, 2023 (aged 82); Birmingham, Alabama, U.S.

Playing career
- 1962: Auburn
- Position: Fullback

Coaching career (HC unless noted)
- 1966–1970: Woodlawn HS (AL)
- 1971–1984: Oxford HS (AL)
- 1985–1996: Jacksonville State

Head coaching record
- Overall: 84–49–4 (college); 127–68–5 (high school)
- Tournaments: 12–4 (NCAA D-II playoffs)

Accomplishments and honors

Championships
- 1 NCAA Division II (1992); 4 GSC (1988–1989, 1991–1992)

Bill Burgess (January 26, 1941 – December 13, 2023) was an American college football coach. He served as the head football coach at Jacksonville State University in Jacksonville, Alabama, for 12 seasons, from 1985 until 1996, compiling a record of 84–49–4. In 1992, he led his team to a national title, winning the NCAA Division II Football Championship.

A native of Birmingham, Alabama, Burgess played fullback in college for the Auburn Tigers and earned an athletic letter for the 1962 season under head coach Ralph Jordan. In 2011, he was inducted into the Division II Hall of Fame. In 2019, he was inducted into the Alabama Sports Hall of Fame. He was the father of Rick and Greg Burgess from the nationally syndicated Rick and Bubba radio show.

Burgess died in Birmingham, Alabama on December 13, 2023, at the age of 82.

== Head coaching record ==
=== College ===
Year	Team	Overall	Conference	Standing	Bowl/playoffs
Jacksonville State Gamecocks (Gulf South Conference) (1985–1992)
1985	Jacksonville State	3–6–1	3–5	T–6th	
1986	Jacksonville State	5–4–1	4–3–1	T–4th	
1987	Jacksonville State	5–4–1	3–4–1	T–5th	
1988	Jacksonville State	10–2	7–1	T–1st	L NCAA Division II Quarterfinal
1989	Jacksonville State	13–1	8–0	1st	L NCAA Division II Championship
1990	Jacksonville State	9–3	6–2	T–2nd	L NCAA Division II Quarterfinal
1991	Jacksonville State	12–1	6–0	1st	L NCAA Division II Championship
1992	Jacksonville State	12–1–1	5–0–1	1st	W NCAA Division II Championship
Jacksonville State Gamecocks (NCAA Division II independent) (1993–1994)
1993	Jacksonville State	3–7			
1994	Jacksonville State	4–7			
Jacksonville State Gamecocks (NCAA Division I-AA independent) (1995–1996)
1995	Jacksonville State	7–4			
1996	Jacksonville State	1–9			
Jacksonville State:		84–49–4	43–15–3		
Total:		84–49–4			
National championship Conference title Conference division title or championship game berth
