= Alan Bonner =

American football player (born 1990)

No. 16
- Positions: Wide receiver, return specialist

Personal information
- Born: November 5, 1990 (age 36); Newnan, Georgia, U.S.
- Listed height: 5 ft 10 in (1.78 m)
- Listed weight: 191 lb (87 kg)

Career information
- High school: Newnan (Newnan, Georgia)
- College: Jacksonville State
- NFL draft: 2013: 6th round, 195th overall pick

Career history
- Houston Texans (2013–2015)

Awards and highlights
- 2009 OVC All-Newcomer Team
- Stats at Pro Football Reference

Michael Alan Bonner (born November 5, 1990) is an American former football wide receiver. He was selected by the Houston Texans in the sixth round of the 2013 NFL draft. He played college football at Jacksonville State University.

== Early life ==
Bonner was the team captain of the Newnan High School football team, playing under coach Robert Herring. An All-District, All-Region and All-State performer, he ended his high school career with 93 catches for 1,932 career yards.

== College career ==
Alan attended Jacksonville State University, joining the Gamecocks as a freshman in 2009. In 2010 Bonner served as the Gamecocks' main returner as well as a backup receiver, making 17 catches and 5 touchdowns. In 2011 Bonner's focus shifted to receiving, with 33 catches and 3 touchdowns; he started 10 out of 11 games in this year.

== Professional career ==
Pre-draft measurables
Height	Weight	Arm length	Hand span	40-yard dash	20-yard shuttle	Vertical jump	Broad jump	Bench press
5 ft 10 in (1.78 m)	193 lb (88 kg)	30 1/4 in (0.77 m)	9 3/8 in (0.24 m)	4.59 s	4.15 s	33.0 in (0.84 m)	0 ft 117 in (2.97 m)	14 reps
All values from the NFL Combine

He was selected by the Houston Texans in the sixth round, 195th overall in the 2013 NFL draft. Bonner spent the entire 2013 and 2014 seasons on injured reserve.
