= Troymaine Pope =

American football player (born 1993)

Profile
- Position: Running back

Personal information
- Born: November 29, 1993 (age 32); Anniston, Alabama, U.S.
- Listed height: 5 ft 8 in (1.73 m)
- Listed weight: 205 lb (93 kg)

Career information
- High school: Anniston
- College: Jacksonville State
- NFL draft: 2016: undrafted

Career history
- Seattle Seahawks (2016)*; New York Jets (2016); Seattle Seahawks (2016); Indianapolis Colts (2017)*; Houston Texans (2017–2018)*; Seattle Seahawks (2018)*; Los Angeles Chargers (2018–2020); Tampa Bay Buccaneers (2021)*; Saskatchewan Roughriders (2022)*
- * Offseason or practice squad member only

Career NFL statistics
- Rushing attempts: 22
- Rushing yards: 64
- Receptions: 3
- Receiving yards: 19
- Return yards: 184
- Total touchdowns: 1
- Stats at Pro Football Reference

Troymaine D. Pope (born November 29, 1993) is an American former professional football player who was a running back in the National Football League (NFL). He played college football for the Jacksonville State Gamecocks. He was also a member of the Seattle Seahawks, New York Jets, Indianapolis Colts, Houston Texans, Los Angeles Chargers, Tampa Bay Buccaneers and Saskatchewan Roughriders.

== Professional career ==
Pre-draft measurables
Height	Weight	Arm length	Hand span	40-yard dash	10-yard split	20-yard split	20-yard shuttle	Three-cone drill	Vertical jump	Broad jump	Bench press
5 ft 7 7/8 in (1.72 m)	205 lb (93 kg)	30 1/8 in (0.77 m)	9 5/8 in (0.24 m)	4.55 s	1.57 s	2.54 s	4.21 s	6.87 s	35.0 in (0.89 m)	10 ft 0 in (3.05 m)	25 reps
All values from Pro Day

=== Seattle Seahawks (first stint) ===
Pope signed with the Seattle Seahawks as an undrafted free agent in 2016. He released by the Seahawks on September 3, 2016.

=== New York Jets ===
On September 4, 2016, Pope was claimed off waivers by the New York Jets. He was released by the Jets on November 1.

=== Seattle Seahawks (second stint) ===
Pope was signed to the Seahawks' practice squad on November 3, 2016. He was promoted to the active roster on November 15. Pope was placed on injured reserve on December 13 with an ankle sprain. He was waived by the team on May 31, 2017.

=== Indianapolis Colts ===
On June 15, 2017, Pope signed with the Indianapolis Colts. He was waived on September 2, and signed to the practice squad on September 26. Pope was released by the Colts three days later.

=== Houston Texans ===
On November 22, 2017, Pope was signed to the Houston Texans' practice squad. He signed a reserve/future contract with the Texans on January 1, 2018. On September 2, Pope was waived by the Texans.

=== Seattle Seahawks (third stint) ===
On November 6, 2018, Pope was signed to the Seahawks' practice squad. He was released on November 20.

=== Los Angeles Chargers ===
On November 28, 2018, Pope was signed to the Los Angeles Chargers' practice squad. On December 13, Pope was promoted to their active roster. He was waived on January 11, 2019. On January 19, Los Angeles signed Pope to a reserve/future contract for the 2019 season. Pope made the Chargers' 53-man roster in 2019, playing in 14 games primarily on special teams and as a kick returner. He had ten carries for 20 rushing yards to go along with two receptions for 14 yards and one touchdown on the season.

On September 18, 2020, Pope was signed to the Chargers' practice squad. He was elevated to the active roster on October 12 and 24 for the team's Weeks 5 and 7 games against the New Orleans Saints and Jacksonville Jaguars, and reverted to the practice squad after each game. He was promoted to the active roster on October 31. Pope was waived on December 17, and signed to the practice squad two days later. His practice squad contract with the team expired after the season on January 11, 2021.

=== Tampa Bay Buccaneers ===
On May 17, 2021, Pope signed with the Tampa Bay Buccaneers. He was waived/injured on August 22 and placed on injured reserve. He was released on September 2.

=== Saskatchewan Roughriders ===
On May 11, 2022, Pope signed with the Saskatchewan Roughriders of the Canadian Football League.
