= Chris Landrum =

American football player (born 1992)

No. 46, 42
- Position: Linebacker

Personal information
- Born: September 14, 1992 (age 34); Meridian, Mississippi, U.S.
- Listed height: 6 ft 2 in (1.88 m)
- Listed weight: 245 lb (111 kg)

Career information
- High school: Sweet Water (Sweet Water, Alabama)
- College: Jacksonville State
- NFL draft: 2016: undrafted

Career history
- San Diego / Los Angeles Chargers (2016–2018); Houston Texans (2018–2019)

Career NFL statistics
- Total tackles: 10
- Sacks: 1
- Stats at Pro Football Reference

Christopher Lewis Landrum, Sr. (born September 14, 1992) is an American former professional football player who was a linebacker in the National Football League (NFL). He played college football for the Auburn Tigers before transferring to Jacksonville State Gamecocks. He was signed by the San Diego Chargers as an undrafted free agent after the 2016 NFL draft.

== Early life ==
Landrum attended Sweet Water High School. In 2009, as a junior, he recorded 68 tackles and 12 sacks on defense and 974 rushing yards on offense. As a senior, he helped lead his team to the 2010 state championship and was named the state championship game's Most Valuable Player (MVP), a game in which he recorded seven tackles and a fumble recovery on defense and an eight-yard rushing touchdown on offense. He was named to the All-Southeast Regional team by PrepStar. He was listed as the 10th overall recruit from Alabama by SuperPrep, 13th on the Birmingham News' list of the Alabama Super Senior, 17th overall on the Mobile Press-Register's Elite 18, 22nd overall outside linebacker in the nation, the 11th player overall in the state of Alabama by Scout.com, the 48th overall outside linebacker in the nation and the 19th player overall in Alabama by Rivals.com, and the 105th overall outside linebacker in the nation by ESPN.com and Scouts, Inc.

== College career ==
=== Auburn ===
Landrum originally attended Auburn University. In 2011, he redshirted as a true freshman. In 2012, he appeared in one game.

=== Jacksonville State ===
Landrum transferred to Jacksonville State University (JSU). In 2013, as a sophomore, he appeared in 15 games (11 starts). He recorded 38 tackles, 11 tackles-for-loss, four sacks, four quarterback hurries, and one pass defensed. He was named to the Ohio Valley Conference (OVC) All-Newcomer team. As a junior in 2014, he started all 12 games. He recorded 3.5 sacks and 9.5 tackles-for-loss. He was named to the Second-team All-Ohio Valley Conference team. In 2015, as a senior, he tied the school record with 19 tackles-for-loss and was named an All-American and First-tam All-OVC.

He earned his degree in human resource management at Jacksonville State and began working on his Master's degree in sports management.

== Professional career ==
Pre-draft measurables
Height	Weight	40-yard dash	10-yard split	20-yard split	20-yard shuttle	Three-cone drill	Vertical jump	Broad jump	Bench press
6 ft 2 in (1.88 m)	245 lb (111 kg)	4.79 s	1.65 s	2.68 s	4.62 s	7.29 s	31 in (0.79 m)	9 ft 5 in (2.87 m)	17 reps
All values from Jacksonville State Pro day.

=== San Diego / Los Angeles Chargers ===
After going undrafted in the 2016 NFL draft, Landrum signed with the San Diego Chargers. He was released on September 3, 2016, and was later signed to the practice squad. On October 22, he was promoted to the Chargers active roster.

On August 22, 2017, Landrum was waived with an injury designation by the Chargers. After going unclaimed, he was placed on injured reserve.

In 2018, Landrum played in seven games before being waived on December 20, 2018.

=== Houston Texans ===
On December 24, 2018, Landrum was signed to the Houston Texans practice squad. He signed a reserve/future contract on January 7, 2019.

On August 10, 2019, Landrum was waived/injured by the Texans and placed on injured reserve. He was waived on July 14, 2020.

== Personal life ==
Chris Landrum is the son of Roosevelt and Jaqueline Landrum. He has three brothers, Deshawn, Laderius, and Jayden, and one sister, Andrea Landrum. He is married to Bria Landrum and has a son, Christopher Landrum, Jr.
