= Rick Rhoades =

American football player and coach (born 1947)

Biographical details
- Born: January 17, 1947 (age 79)

Playing career
- 1965–1969: Central Missouri State

Coaching career (HC unless noted)
- 1972: Handley HS (AL)
- 1973–1975: Jefferson Davis HS (AL) (assistant)
- 1976: Mountain Brook HS (AL)
- 1977: Davidson HS (AL)
- 1978–1979: Troy State (OL)
- 1980: Andalusia HS (AL)
- 1981–1982: North Alabama (OC)
- 1983–1984: Troy State (DC)
- 1985–1987: Troy State
- 1988: Southern Illinois
- 1989: Alabama (OL)
- 1990: Kentucky (OL)
- 1991–1992: Kentucky (OC/RB)
- 1993–1994: Nicholls State
- 1995: Stephen F. Austin (LB)
- 1996–2000: Pelham HS (AL)
- 2001: Birmingham Thunderbolts (OL)
- 2002–2006: Delta State
- 2007–2011: Graz Giants
- 2012: Carlstad Crusaders (OC)
- 2013: La Courneuve Flash
- 2015: Carlstad Crusaders (OC)
- 2015–2016: KDS DAR HS (AL) (DC)
- 2016–2018: Wroclaw Panthers (assistant)
- 2019–present: Salzburg Ducks (DC)

Head coaching record
- Overall: 78–48–1 (college); 68–26 (high school)
- Tournaments: 7–2 (NCAA D-II playoffs)

Accomplishments and honors

Championships
- 1 NCAA Division II (1987); 2 GSC (1986–1987); EFAF Cup (2007); 1 Austrian Bowl (2008)

Awards
- 2× Gulf South Coach of The Year (1986—1987)

Rick Rhoades (born January 16, 1947) is an American football coach who has worked at the high school, college, and professional levels. He served as head football coach at the collegiate level at Troy State University from 1985 to 1987, Southern Illinois University Carbondale in 1988, Nicholls State University from 1993 to 1994 and Delta State University from 2002 to 2006.

At the professional level, he served as head football coach of the Graz Giants in the Austrian Football League from 2007 to 2011 and La Courneuve Flash France in 2013.

== Coaching career ==
=== High school coaching ===
Rhodes began his coaching career in 1972 as head football coach at Handley High School in Roanoke, Alabama and finished 1–8–1. From 1973 to 1975, he was an assistant football coach at Jefferson Davis High School in Montgomery, Alabama. In 1976, he accepted the head coaching position at Mountain Brook High School in Mountain Brook, Alabama, where he guided the Mountain Brook Spartans to a 14–0 record and a state championship. During the 1977 season, he became head coach at Davidson High School in Mobile, Alabama and had a 7–3 record. In 1980, he was named head coach at Andalusia High School in Andalusia, Alabama where he spent one season and had a record of 6–4. In 1996, he returned to high school football as head football coach at Pelham High School in Pelham, Alabama, where he posted a 41–19 record and five playoff appearances in his five years as head coach through 2000. From 2015 to 2016, Rhoades was defensive coordinator at Kate Duncan Smith DAR School in Grant, Alabama under his son and head coach, Bobby Rhoades. Over his nine years as a high school head coach, he compiled an overall record of 69 wins, 34 losses and 1 tie.

=== College coaching ===
Rhoades first college coaching job was as offensive line coach at Troy State University from 1978 to 1979. In 1981, Rhodes was hired for his first college coordinator position as offensive coordinator at the University of North Alabama through the 1982 season. In 1983, he became the defensive coordinator at Troy State and remained in that position through the 1984 season with the 1984 Troy State team capturing the NCAA Division II National Championship. In 1985, Rhodes was hired for his first head coaching position at Troy State after the schools previous head coach Chan Gailey left for an NFL coaching position. In 1986, he led Troy State to a Gulf South Conference championship and the 1987 team repeated as Gulf South Conference champions and won the NCAA Division II National Championship. He was Gulf South Conference coach of the year in 1986 and 1987. The 1987 season was Rhoades final season at Troy State where he compiled a record of 28 wins, 7 losses and 1 tie. For the 1988 season, Rhoades left for a Division I-AA head coaching position at Southern Illinois University Carbondale. It was his only season at Southern Illinois Carbondale and he finished with a record of 4 wins and 7 losses.

In 1989, Rhoades took his first Division I-A coaching position at the University of Alabama as the offensive line coach under Bill Curry. In 1990, Curry left for the head coaching position at the University of Kentucky and Rhoades moved with him to be his offensive coordinator, a position he held through the 1992 season. For the 1993 season, Rhodes was hired as head football coach at Nicholls State University and remained in that position through 1994. In his first year at Nicholls State, the team went 3–8. In his second year, the team improved to 5–6 for an overall record of 8 wins and 14 losses at the school. While at Nicholls State, Rhoades installed the "Stack-I" offense and it accounted for 11 school records the first season and the Colonels were ranked ninth in the nation in rushing the second year using the system. Following Nicholls State, Rhodes spent one season at Stephen F. Austin University as linebackers coach in 1995. Rhoades returned to college coaching in 2002 after spending time in the high school and professional ranks. Rhoades was head coach at Delta State University from 2002 to 2006 and had a record of 38 wins and 20 losses. In his final season, he led Delta State to the NCAA Division II national semifinals. As a college head coach, Rhoades compiled an overall record of 78 wins, 48 losses and 1 tie.

=== Professional coaching ===
Rhoades first experience in professional football was as the offensive line coach for the Birmingham Thunderbolts of the XFL in 2001.

From 2007 to 2011, Rhoades was head coach of the Graz Giants in the Austrian Football League. In his first season in 2007, he led the Giants to the EFAF Cup championship. In his second season, the team won the 2008 Austrian Bowl to win the Austrian Football League championship. During Rhoades tenure, the Giants reached the Austrian Bowl every season. Also under Rhoades, the Giants reached the Eurobowl semifinals four times from 2008 to 2011. During his time in Austria, Rhoades also served as head coach of the Austrian national team for two years from 2009 to 2010. In 2010, he guided the team to a second-place finish in the European championships and a seventh-place finish in the World Championships. In 2012, he was hired as offensive coordinator for the Carlstad Crusaders in Sweden. In 2013, Rhoades was named head coach of the La Courneuve Flash in France and remained in that role until April 2014.

Rhoades didn't coach in Europe in 2014, but returned in 2015 where he spent time in training camp with the Wroclaw Panthers in Poland and also spent time in his previous role as the offensive coordinator for the Carlstad Crusaders. In 2016, Rhoades returned to the Wroclaw Panthers as an assistant coach and served in that role through 2018. During the 2018 season, he served as quarterbacks/linebackers coach for the Panthers. In 2019, Rhoades became the defensive coordinator for the Salzburg Ducks in Austria. That season the team finished with an overall record of 8–0 and a postseason record of 1–1 losing in the Iron Bowl (Division II finals). The Ducks were promoted to the top level of Austrian Football League before the 2022 season.

== Head coaching record ==
=== College ===
Year	Team	Overall	Conference	Standing	Bowl/playoffs
Troy State Trojans (Gulf South Conference) (1985–1987)
1985	Troy State	6–4	6–2	3rd	
1986	Troy State	10–2	8–0	1st	L NCAA Division II Semifinal
1987	Troy State	12–1–1	8–0	1st	W NCAA Division II Championship
Troy State:		28–7–1	22–2		
Southern Illinois Salukis (Gateway Collegiate Athletic Conference) (1988)
1988	Southern Illinois	4–7	2–4	5th	
Southern Illinois:		4–7	2–4		
Nicholls State Colonels (Southland Conference) (1993–1994)
1993	Nicholls State	3–8	2–5	T–5th	
1994	Nicholls State	5–6	1–5	T–5th	
Nicholls State:		8–14	3–10		
Delta State Statesmen (Gulf South Conference) (2002–2006)
2002	Delta State	4–7	4–5	7th	
2003	Delta State	9–2	7–2	T–3rd	
2004	Delta State	6–4	6–3	T–3rd	
2005	Delta State	7–4	6–3	T–5th	
2006	Delta State	12–3	7–1	2nd	L NCAA Division II Semifinal
Delta State:		38–20	30–14		
Total:		78–48–1			
National championship Conference title Conference division title or championship game berth

=== High school ===
Year	Team	Overall	Conference	Standing	Bowl/playoffs
Mountain Brook Spartans () (1976)
1976	Mountain Brook	14–0	4–0	1st	
Mountain Brook:		14–0	4–0		
Davidson Warriors () (1977)
1977	Davidson	7–3	5–2	3rd	
Andalusia Bulldogs () (1980)
1980	Andalusia	6–4	3–3	T–4th	
Andalusia:		6–4	3–3		
Pelham Panthers () (1996–2000)
1996	Pelham	8–4	2–1	2nd	
1997	Pelham	9–3	2–1	T–1st	
1998	Pelham	9–3	2–1	2nd	
1999	Pelham	10–3	2–1	2nd	
2000	Pelham	5–6	4–3	4th	
Pelham:		41–19	12–7		
Total:		68–26			
National championship Conference title Conference division title or championship game berth
