= 1992 Jacksonville State Gamecocks football team =

American college football season

1992 Jacksonville State Gamecocks football

NCAA Division II champion GSC champion

NCAA Division II Championship Game, W 17–13 vs. Pittsburg State
- Conference: Gulf South Conference
- Record: 12–1–1 (5–0–1 GSC)
- Head coach: Bill Burgess (8th season)
- Offensive coordinator: Charles Maniscalco (8th season)
- Defensive coordinator: Roland Houston (1st season)
- Home stadium: Paul Snow Stadium

1992 Gulf South Conference football standings
	Conf.					Overall
Team	W		L		T	W		L		T
No. 3 Jacksonville State $^	5	–	0	–	1	12	–	1	–	1
No. T–16 North Alabama	3	–	2	–	1	7	–	4	–	1
No. T–20 Valdosta State	3	–	2	–	1	5	–	4	–	1
Mississippi College	2	–	3	–	1	4	–	5	–	1
Livingston	2	–	4	–	0	5	–	4	–	0
West Georgia	2	–	4	–	0	5	–	6	–	0
Delta State	2	–	4	–	0	3	–	6	–	1
$ – Conference champion; ^ – NCAA Division II playoff participant; Rankings from NCAA Division II Football Committee poll

The 1992 Jacksonville State Gamecocks football team was an American football team that represented Jacksonville State University as a member of the Gulf South Conference (GSC) during the 1992 NCAA Division II football season. In their eighth year under head coach Bill Burgess, the team compiled an overall record of 12–1–1 with mark of 5–0–1 against conference opponents, winning the GSC title. For the fifth consecutive season, Jacksonville State advanced to the NCAA Division II Football Championship playoffs, beating Savannah State in the first round, North Alabama in the quarterfinals, New Haven in the semifinals, and Pittsburg State, 17–13, in the championship game.

Key players included halfback and return specialist Danny Lee who was named Small College Player of the Year by the Alabama Sports Writers Association and Football Gazette. Head coach Bill Burgess was also named national coach of the year. Assistant coaches included Charlie Maniscalco (offensive coordinator) and Roland Houston (defensive coordinator).

The team played its home games at Paul Snow Stadium in Jacksonville, Alabama.

== Schedule ==
Date	Opponent	Rank	Site	Result	Attendance	Source
September 5	at Alabama A&M*	No. 2	Milton Frank Stadium; Huntsville, AL	W 7–6	11,000	
September 19	at West Georgia	No. 3	Grisham Stadium; Carrollton, GA	W 17–10	6,211	
September 26	Valdosta State	No. 3	Paul Snow Stadium; Jacksonville, AL	W 20–6	12,800	
October 3	at Mississippi College	No. T–2	Robinson–Hale Stadium; Clinton, MS	T 14–14	6,145	
October 10	Delta State	No. 5	Paul Snow Stadium; Jacksonville, AL	W 38–10	1,500	
October 17	at No. 15 North Alabama	No. 4	Braly Municipal Stadium; Florence, AL	W 10–6	5,850	
October 24	at Georgia Southern*	No. 4	Paulson Stadium; Statesboro, GA	L 0–10	16,366	
October 31	Alcorn State*	No. T–4	Paul Memorial Stadium; Jacksonville, AL	W 59–45	12,100	
November 7	Livingston	No. 3	Paul Snow Stadium; Jacksonville, AL	W 54–27	13,650	
November 14	Kentucky State*	No. 3	Paul Snow Stadium; Jacksonville, AL	W 63–21	8,400	
November 21	No T–20 Savannah State*	No. 3	Paul Snow Stadium; Jacksonville, AL (NCAA Division II First Round)	W 41–16		
November 28	at No T–16 North Alabama*	No. 3	Braly Municipal Stadium; Florence, AL (NCAA Division II Quarterfinal)	W 14–12		
December 5	No. 5 New Haven*	No. 3	Paul Snow Stadium; Jacksonville, AL (NCAA Division II Semifinal)	W 46–35	5,804	
December 12	vs. No. 1 Pittsburg State*	No. 3	Braly Municipal Stadium; Florence, AL (NCAA Division II Championship Game)	W 17–13	11,733	
*Non-conference game; Rankings from NCAA Division II Football Committee Poll released prior to the game
