= Jim Fuller (American football) =

American football player (1945–2021)

Biographical details
- Born: July 5, 1945; Birmingham, Alabama, U.S.
- Died: September 1, 2021 (aged 76); Keller, Texas, U.S.

Playing career
- 1964–1966: Alabama
- Position: Tackle

Coaching career (HC unless noted)
- 1967–1968: Fairfield HS (AL) (assistant)
- 1969: Fairfield HS (AL)
- 1970–1973: Jacksonville State (OL)
- 1974: East Carolina (OL)
- 1975–1976: Jacksonville State (OC)
- 1977–1983: Jacksonville State
- 1984–1996: Alabama (OL)

Administrative career (AD unless noted)
- 2003–2008: Jacksonville State

Head coaching record
- Overall: 54–25 (college); 7–3 (high school)
- Tournaments: 3–5 (NCAA D-II playoffs)

Accomplishments and honors

Championships
- 4 GSC (1977–1978, 1981–1982)

Awards
- 4× GSC Coach of the Year (1977–1978, 1981–1982)

James Warren Fuller (July 5, 1945 – September 1, 2021) was an American college football coach and athletics administrator. He served as the head football coach at Jacksonville State University from 1977 to 1983, compiling a record of 54–25. Fuller was also the athletic director at Jacksonville State from 2003 to 2008.

Fuller died from complications of COVID-19 on September 1, 2021 in Keller, Texas, during the COVID-19 pandemic in Texas. He was 76.

== Head coaching record ==
=== College ===
Year	Team	Overall	Conference	Standing	Bowl/playoffs
Jacksonville State Gamecocks (Gulf South Conference) (1977–1983)
1977	Jacksonville State	11–3	7–1	1st	L NCAA Division II Championship
1978	Jacksonville State	7–3	6–1	1st	L NCAA Division II Quarterfinal
1979	Jacksonville State	4–6	1–5	T–6th	
1980	Jacksonville State	8–3	5–1	2nd	L NCAA Division II Quarterfinal
1981	Jacksonville State	8–3	6–0	1st	L NCAA Division II Quarterfinal
1982	Jacksonville State	10–2	7–0	1st	L NCAA Division II Semifinal
1983	Jacksonville State	6–5	4–4	T–4th	
Jacksonville State:		54–25	36–12		
Total:		54–25			
National championship Conference title Conference division title or championship game berth
