= Jack Crowe =

American football coach (born 1947)

Biographical details
- Born: May 2, 1947 (age 79); Birmingham, Alabama, U.S.

Coaching career (HC unless noted)
- 1973–1976: Livingston (OC)
- 1977–1978: Livingston
- 1979–1980: North Alabama (OC)
- 1981: Wyoming (OC)
- 1982–1985: Auburn (OC)
- 1986–1988: Clemson (OC)
- 1989: Arkansas (OC)
- 1990–1992: Arkansas
- 1993–1995: Baylor (OC)
- 2000–2012: Jacksonville State

Head coaching record
- Overall: 101–87
- Bowls: 0–1
- Tournaments: 0–3 (NCAA D-I-AA playoffs)

Accomplishments and honors

Championships
- 2 OVC (2003–2004)

Awards
- OVC Coach of the Year (2004)

Jack Crowe (born May 2, 1947) is an American former college football coach. He played quarterback at West End High School in Birmingham, Alabama. He was most recently the head coach at Jacksonville State University in Alabama, a position he held from 2000 to 2012. Crowe also served as the head football coach at the University of Arkansas from 1990 to 1992. Crowe was also the head coach at Livingston University, now known as the University of West Alabama, from 1977 to 1978. He served as offensive coordinator for head coach Pat Dye at Auburn. In addition, Crowe has served as an assistant coach at the University of North Alabama, Clemson University, and Baylor University. He is married to Leann Crowe.

== Coaching career ==
Crowe first came to Arkansas in 1989 as offensive coordinator under Ken Hatfield. That season ended with a Southwest Conference championship and a 10–2 record. But when Hatfield left to become head coach at Clemson a month after the season ended, athletic director Frank Broyles was reportedly in a difficult situation. There was not enough time to find a big-name replacement, and National Signing Day was only three weeks away. Broyles persuaded Crowe to abandon his initial plans to follow Hatfield to Clemson and take over as head coach of the Razorbacks. By the start of the season, Barry Foster had given up his senior season to enter the 1990 NFL draft and the Razorbacks had lost numerous other players to disciplinary and academic problems. Under the circumstances, the Razorbacks struggled, finishing with a 3–8 record. They barely qualified for a bowl in 1991.

The Razorbacks opened the 1992 season—their first in the Southeastern Conference—with an upset loss to Division I-AA team The Citadel. The final score was 3–10 after a Citadel player blocked a field goal attempt and it was returned for a touchdown with just a few seconds left in the game. The next day, Broyles announced that Crowe had resigned and that defensive coordinator Joe Kines would coach the Razorbacks for the rest of the season. However, Crowe's lawyer subsequently stated to Sports Illustrated that Crowe had been fired, and Broyles admitted that he had fired Crowe because of concern that the fans no longer had confidence in him. Crowe's record was 9–15 in two seasons and one game in Fayetteville.

At Jacksonville State, Crowe won two official conference titles. In 2009, the team would have won a third, but JSU was ineligible for the conference title and postseason play after being placed on Academic Progress Rate probation due to the team's poor academic performance. He also coached Ashley Martin, the first woman to play and score in an NCAA football game and the second woman to play and score in a college game in any division.

Crowe's Jacksonville State achieved a major upset to start the season, beating Houston Nutt's Ole Miss Rebels at Vaught–Hemingway Stadium, 49–48 in double overtime. Nutt had been an assistant under Crowe when Crowe was fired from Arkansas. On November 30, 2012, Crowe was fired by Jacksonville State.

== Head coaching record ==
Year	Team	Overall	Conference	Standing	Bowl/playoffs
Livingston Tigers (Gulf South Conference) (1977–1978)
1977	Livingston	2–8	1–7	9th	
1978	Livingston	3–7	1–6	8th	
Livingston:		5–15	2–13		
Arkansas Razorbacks (Southwest Conference) (1990–1991)
1990	Arkansas	3–8	1–7	8th	
1991	Arkansas	6–6	5–3	T–2nd	L Independence
Arkansas Razorbacks (Southeastern Conference) (1992)
1992	Arkansas	0–1*	0–0		
Arkansas:		9–15	6–10	*Fired after 1 game	
Jacksonville State Gamecocks (Southland Conference) (2000–2002)
2000	Jacksonville State	4–6	2–5	6th	
2001	Jacksonville State	5–6	2–4	5th	
2002	Jacksonville State	5–6	2–4	T–5th	
Jacksonville State Gamecocks (Ohio Valley Conference) (2003–2012)
2003	Jacksonville State	8–4	7–1	1st	L NCAA Division I-AA First Round
2004	Jacksonville State	9–2	7–1	1st	L NCAA Division I-AA First Round
2005	Jacksonville State	6–5	6–2	3rd	
2006	Jacksonville State	6–5	5–3	T–4th	
2007	Jacksonville State	6–5	5–3	T–3rd	
2008	Jacksonville State	8–3	6–2	T–2nd	
2009	Jacksonville State	8–3	6–1	1st*	not awarded OVC title due to APR penalty
2010	Jacksonville State	9–3	6–2	2nd	L NCAA Division I Second Round
2011	Jacksonville State	7–4	6–2	T–1st	
2012	Jacksonville State	6–5	5–3	4th	
Jacksonville State:		87–57	66–35		
Total:		101–87			

== See also ==
- 2001 Cumberland vs. Jacksonville State football game
