= Jacksonville State–Samford football rivalry =

American college football rivalry

- Jacksonville State Gamecocks Samford Bulldogs
- First meeting: November 4, 1905; Howard, 32–0
- Latest meeting: November 30, 2013; Jacksonville State, 55–14

Statistics
- Total meetings: 47
- All-time series: Jacksonville State leads, 23–21–3
- Largest victory: Jacksonville State, 55–7 (2006)
- Longest win streak: Samford, 9 (1921–1933) & Jacksonville State, 9 (2000–present)
- Longest unbeaten streak: Samford, 16 (1905–1933)
- Current win streak: Jacksonville State, 9 (2000–present)

Locations of Jacksonville State and Samford

The Jacksonville State–Samford football rivalry is an American college football rivalry between the Jacksonville State Gamecocks and Samford Bulldogs. The two schools are located 80 miles apart from each other in eastern Alabama.

== History ==
The two teams first met on the football field in 1905, and have met 47 times since then. Jacksonville State currently leads the series 23–21–3.

== Game results ==
Jacksonville State victories	Samford victories	Tie games

No.	Date	Location	Winner	Score
1	November 4, 1905	Anniston, AL	Howard	32–0
2	November 14, 1908	Anniston, AL	Howard	21–0
3	October 15, 1909	Birmingham, AL	Howard	33–0
4	September 28, 1912	Birmingham, AL	Howard	8–0
5	October 10, 1913	Birmingham, AL	Tie	0–0
6	November 17, 1916	Birmingham, AL	Howard	27–0
7	1918	?	Tie	0–0
8	October 14, 1921	Birmingham, AL	Howard	39–7
9	September 23, 1922	Birmingham, AL	Howard	12–0
10	November 10, 1923	Anniston, AL	Howard	27–0
11	October 4, 1924	Birmingham, AL	Howard	35–0
12	October 16, 1925	Jacksonville, AL	Howard	13–0
13	October 15, 1926	Anniston, AL	Howard	13–0
14	October 14, 1927	Birmingham, AL	Howard	43–0
15	October 3, 1930	Anniston, AL	Howard	20–0
16	September 22, 1933	Birmingham, AL	Howard	31–0
17	November 18, 1948	Jacksonville, AL	Jacksonville State	14–0
18	November 22, 1950	Birmingham, AL	Jacksonville State	28–7
19	November 21, 1951	Jacksonville, AL	Tie	19–19
20	November 22, 1952	Trussville, AL	Jacksonville State	14–0
21	November 21, 1953	Anniston, AL	Jacksonville State	26–13
22	November 20, 1954	Birmingham, AL	Jacksonville State	32–0
23	November 19, 1955	Talladega, AL	Jacksonville State	67–24
24	September 25, 1965	Jacksonville, AL	Jacksonville State	23–3
25	September 24, 1966	Birmingham, AL	Samford	28–14

No.	Date	Location	Winner	Score
26	September 23, 1967	Jacksonville, AL	Samford	20–13
27	September 21, 1968	Birmingham, AL	Samford	20–14
28	September 20, 1969	Jacksonville, AL	Jacksonville State	20–10
29	September 19, 1970	Birmingham, AL	Jacksonville State	34–9
30	October 23, 1971	Jacksonville, AL	Samford	31–21
31	November 4, 1972	Anniston, AL	Jacksonville State	27–6
32	September 3, 1988	Jacksonville, AL	Jacksonville State	34–6
33	September 2, 1989	Birmingham, AL	Jacksonville State	19–9
34	October 14, 1995	Birmingham, AL	Jacksonville State	35–14
35	October 19, 1996	Jacksonville, AL	Samford	27–17
36	November 1, 1997	Birmingham, AL	Samford	17–14
37	October 17, 1998	Jacksonville, AL	Jacksonville State	21–0
38	October 2, 1999	Birmingham, AL	Samford	34–18
39	September 21, 2000	Jacksonville, AL	Jacksonville State	36–16
40	October 6, 2001	Birmingham, AL	Jacksonville State	39–7
41	October 5, 2002	Jacksonville, AL	Jacksonville State	37–23
42	November 8, 2003	Birmingham, AL	Jacksonville State	49–32
43	November 6, 2004	Jacksonville, AL	Jacksonville State	51–18
44	November 12, 2005	Birmingham, AL	Jacksonville State	26–20
45	November 11, 2006	Jacksonville, AL	Jacksonville State	55–7
46	November 3, 2007	Birmingham, AL	Jacksonville State	24–12
47	November 30, 2013^{A}	Jacksonville, AL^{A}	Jacksonville State	55–14
Series: Jacksonville State leads 23–21–3
^{A} 2013 FCS 1st Round Playoff Game

== See also ==
- List of NCAA college football rivalry games
