= Mississippi College Choctaws football =

Football team representing Mississippi College

- First season: 1907; 119 years ago
- Last season: 2024; 2 years ago
- Head coach: Mike Kershaw; 1st season, 2–8 (.200)
- Location: Clinton, Mississippi
- Stadium: Robinson-Hale Stadium
- NCAA division: Division II
- Conference: Gulf South Conference
- Colors: Blue, celestial blue, and white
- All-time record: 510–472–37 (.519)

NCAA Division II championships
- 1989 (vacated)

Conference championships
- 5
- Website: GoChoctaws

The Mississippi College Choctaws football team represented Mississippi College (now Mississippi Christian University). The school's teams are known as the Choctaws. Its major rivals are Millsaps College in nearby Jackson and Delta State in Cleveland, Mississippi, in the Delta. After a more than 40-year hiatus, MC and Millsaps teams began meeting on the football field again in 2000. The rivalry was dubbed the Backyard Brawl.

On November 18, 2024, the school announced the discontinuation of the football program with the conclusion of the 2024 season.

== History ==
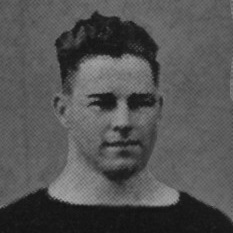
"Goat" Hale.

The first year of the team was in 1907. The 1921 team was led by College Football Hall of Fame inductee Edwin "Goat" Hale.

The team won the Division II National Championship in 1989, however, Mississippi College's football tournament participation, along with its NCAA Division II national football championship, were vacated by the NCAA Committee on Infractions for recruiting violations.

On November 18, 2024, the Mississippi College Board of Trustees renamed the college as Mississippi Christian University, and approved dissolving the football program following the 2024 season.

== Facilities ==
Robinson-Hale Stadium, a 8,500-capacity stadium located in Clinton, Mississippi, was home to the Mississippi College Choctaws football team.

The stadium was built in 1985 and named after two significant contributors to the program, Stanley L. Robinson, who coached the team from 1920 to 1923 and again from 1928 to 1953, and Edwin Hale, who played for the Choctaws between 1915 and 1921 and was later inducted into the College Football Hall of Fame. The first game at the stadium was played October 12, 1985. The Choctaws defeated Jacksonville State, 50–3.

Prior to the 2005 season, the stadium saw major renovations that included the installation of a state-of-the art synthetic playing surface. A running track, the James E. Parkman Track, was added in 2006. In 2011, the entrance got renovated with a new "Circle of Champions" entrance. The turf at the stadium was upgraded in 2015.

== Postseason appearances ==
=== NCAA Division II ===
The Choctaws have four appearances in the NCAA Division II football playoffs, with a combined record of 4–4. This total does not include a vacated national championship in 1989, which included one additional appearance and a 4–0 record.

| Year | Round | Opponent | Result |
|---|---|---|---|
| 1979 | First Round; Semifinals | North Dakota; Delaware | W, 35–15; L, 10–60 |
| 1988 | First Round | Texas A&I | L, 15–39 |
| 1989 | First Round; Quarterfinals; Semifinals; National Championship | Texas A&I; St. Cloud State; Indiana (PA); Jacksonville State | W, 34–19; W, 55–24; W, 26–14; W, 3–0 |
| 1990 | First Round; Quarterfinals; Semifinals | Wofford; Jacksonville State; Indiana (PA) | W, 70–19; W, 14–7; L, 8–27 |
| 1991 | First Round; Quarterfinals | Wofford; Jacksonville State | W, 28–15; L, 7–35 |

=== NCAA Division III ===
The Choctaws made one appearance in the NCAA Division III football playoffs, with a combined record of 1–1.

| Year | Round | Opponent | Result |
|---|---|---|---|
| 2009 | First Round; Second Round | Huntingdon; Wesley | W, 56–35; L, 9–43 |

== Program achievements ==
| Gulf South Conference Champions | 1979, 1988, 1990 |
| American Southwest Conference Champions | 1997, 2009 |
| NCAA Division II Team Playoff Participants | 1979, 1988, 1989, 1990, 1991 |
| NCAA Division II Regional Championships | 1989, 1990 |
| NCAA Division II National Championships | 1989 |
| NCAA Division III Team Playoff Participants | 2009 |
