= Jacksonville State Gamecocks football =

Intercollegiate American football team

2026 Jacksonville State Gamecocks football team
- First season: 1904; 122 years ago
- Athletic director: Greg Seitz
- General manager: Cody Spoon
- Head coach: Charles Kelly; 2nd season, 13–7 (.650)
- Location: Jacksonville, Alabama
- Stadium: AmFirst Stadium (capacity: 22,500)
- NCAA division: Division I FBS
- Conference: Conference USA
- Colors: Red and white
- All-time record: 630–433–39 (.589)
- Bowl record: 2–1 (.667)

NCAA Division II championships
- 1992

Conference championships
- ACC: 1962, 1963, 1964, 1965, 1966 GSC: 1970, 1974, 1977, 1978, 1981, 1982, 1988, 1989, 1991, 1992 OVC: 2003, 2004, 2011, 2014, 2015, 2016, 2017, 2018, 2020 ASUN: 2022 C-USA: 2024
- Rivalries: Kennesaw State (rivalry); Troy (rivalry); Samford (rivalry)
- Marching band: Marching Southerners
- Website: JaxStateSports.com

The Jacksonville State Gamecocks football program is the intercollegiate American football team for Jacksonville State University (JSU) located in the U.S. state of Alabama. The team competes in the NCAA Division I Football Bowl Subdivision (FBS) as a member of the Conference USA. Jacksonville State's first football team was fielded in 1904. The team plays its home games at the 24,000-seat AmFirst Stadium in Jacksonville, Alabama.

On November 5, 2021, the university accepted an invitation to join Conference USA (C-USA) of the NCAA Division I Football Bowl Subdivision (FBS) beginning with the 2023 season.

== History ==
Jacksonville State University's first football team, the Eagle Owls, was formed in the late 19th century. During the first half century of play, Troy University and Samford University became their main rivals. Before the start of the 1947 season, not only did the team change their colors from blue and gold to red and white, but their nickname changed to the Fighting Gamecocks.

Jacksonville State joined the NCAA in 1973, and played at the NCAA Division II level from 1973 to 1994. In 1995, the team moved up to the NCAA Division I Football Championship Subdivision (FCS) and competed in the Southland Conference from 1996 to 2002 before moving to the Ohio Valley Conference from 2003 to 2020. Jacksonville State University planned to leave the Ohio Valley Conference for the Atlantic Sun Conference (ASUN) in July 2021, with the team temporarily competing in the Western Athletic Conference (WAC)'s "ASUN–WAC Challenge" partnership league.

A few months later on November 5, 2021, the school accepted an invitation to join Conference USA beginning with the 2023 season, moving to Division I FBS in the process.

=== Classifications ===
- NAIA (1966–1969)
- NAIA Division I (1970–1981)
- NCAA Division II (1973–1994)
- NCAA Division I FCS (1995–2022)
- NCAA Division I FBS (2023–present)

== Conference affiliations ==
- Independent (1904–1937)
- Southern Intercollegiate Athletic Association (1938–1940)
- Alabama Intercollegiate Conference (1945–1949)
- Independent (1950–1959)
- Alabama Collegiate Conference (1960–1969)
- Mid-South Athletic Conference/Gulf South Conference (1970–1992)
- Division II Independent (1993–1995)
- Southland Conference (1996–2002)
- Ohio Valley Conference (2003–2020)
- AQ7 (2021)
- ASUN Conference (2022)
- Conference USA (2023 and beyond)

== Championships ==
=== National championships ===
Jacksonville State has made four appearances in the NCAA Division II national championship game. The Gamecocks were defeated in their first three championship game appearances, losing 33–0 to Lehigh in 1977, 3–0 to Mississippi College in 1989 (later vacated), and 23–6 to Pittsburg State in 1991. In 1992, the Gamecocks defeated Pittsburg State 17–13, reversing the results in a rematch of their 1991 championship game.

Season	Coach	Selector	Record
1992	Bill Burgess	NCAA Division II	12–1–1

=== Conference championships ===
Jacksonville State has won 25 conference championships, 18 outright and four shared.

Season	Conference	Coach	Overall record	Conference record
1962†	Alabama Collegiate Conference	Don Salls	4–3–2	3–0–1
1963†	Alabama Collegiate Conference	Don Salls	4–4–1	3–0–1
1964	Alabama Collegiate Conference	Don Salls	4–4–1	3–0
1965	Alabama Collegiate Conference	Jim Blevins	7–2	3–0
1966	Alabama Collegiate Conference	Jim Blevins	8–2	3–0
1970	Mid-South Conference	Charley Pell	10–0	5–0
1974	Gulf South Conference	Clarkie Mayfield	7–4	7–1
1977	Gulf South Conference	Jim Fuller	11–3	7–1
1978	Gulf South Conference	Jim Fuller	7–3	6–1
1981	Gulf South Conference	Jim Fuller	8–3	6–0
1982	Gulf South Conference	Jim Fuller	10–2	7–0
1988†	Gulf South Conference	Bill Burgess	10–2	7–1
1989	Gulf South Conference	Bill Burgess	13–1	8–0
1991	Gulf South Conference	Bill Burgess	12–1	6–0
1992	Gulf South Conference	Bill Burgess	12–1–1	5–0–1
2003	Ohio Valley Conference	Jack Crowe	8–4	7–1
2004	Ohio Valley Conference	Jack Crowe	9–2	7–1
2011†	Ohio Valley Conference	Jack Crowe	7–4	6–2
2014	Ohio Valley Conference	John Grass	10–2	8–0
2015	Ohio Valley Conference	John Grass	13–2	8–0
2016	Ohio Valley Conference	John Grass	10–2	7–0
2017	Ohio Valley Conference	John Grass	10–2	8–0
2018	Ohio Valley Conference	John Grass	9–4	7–1
2020	Ohio Valley Conference	John Grass	10–3	6–1
2022	ASUN Conference	Rich Rodriguez	9–2	5–0
2024	Conference USA	Rich Rodriguez	9-4	7-1

† Co-championship

== Bowl games ==
Jacksonville State has participated in eleven bowl games, and has a record of 8–3. However, most of them are not Division I bowl games. Consequently, after joining Division I FBS, they participated in three bowl games, and have a record of 2–1.

Season	Coach	Bowl	Opponent	Result
1948	Don Salls	Paper Bowl†	Troy	W 19–0
1949	Don Salls	Paper Bowl†	West Alabama	W 12–7
1950	Don Salls	Paper Bowl†	Pensacola Naval Alumni	L 6–7
1955	Don Salls	Refrigerator Bowl†	Rhode Island	W 12–10
1966	Jim Blevins	Space City Classic†	Arkansas–Monticello	W 41–30
1970	Charley Pell	Orange Blossom Classic†	Florida A&M	W 21–7
1977	Jim Fuller	Grantland Rice Bowl†	North Dakota State	W 31–7
1977	Jim Fuller	Pioneer Bowl†	Lehigh	L 0–33
2023	Rich Rodriguez	New Orleans Bowl	Louisiana	W 34–31 ^{OT}
2024	Rod Smith	Cure Bowl	Ohio	L 27–30
2025	Charles Kelly	Salute to Veterans Bowl	Troy	W 17–13

† non-Division I bowl game

== Playoff history ==
=== Division I-AA/FCS playoffs results ===
The Gamecocks have appeared in the I-AA/FCS playoffs ten times, with an overall record of 7–10.

Year	Round	Opponent	Result
2003	First round	Western Kentucky	L 7–45
2004	First round	Furman	L 7–49
2010	Second round	Wofford	L 14–17
2013	First round Second round Quarterfinals	Samford; McNeese State; Eastern Washington	W 55–14; W 31–10; L 24–35
2014	Second round	Sam Houston State	L 26–37
2015	Second round Quarterfinals; Semifinals; National championship game	Chattanooga; Charleston Southern; Sam Houston State; North Dakota State	W 41–35 ^{OT} W 58–38; W 62–10; L 10–37
2016	Second round	Youngstown State	L 24–40
2017	Second round	Kennesaw State	L 7–17
2018	First round Second round	East Tennessee State; Maine	W 34–27; L 27–55
2020	First round Quarterfinals	Davidson; Delaware	W 49–14; L 14–20

=== Division II playoffs results ===
The Gamecocks have appeared in the Division II playoffs ten times, with an overall record of 15–9. They were national champions in 1992.

Year	Round	Opponent	Result
1977	Quarterfinals; Semifinals; National championship game	Northern Arizona; North Dakota State; Lehigh	W 35–0; W 31–7; L 0–33
1978	Quarterfinals	Delaware	L 21–42
1980	Quarterfinals	Cal Poly–SLO	L 0–15
1981	Quarterfinals	Southwest Texas State	L 22–38
1982	Quarterfinals; Semifinals	Northwest Missouri State; Southwest Texas State	W 34–21; L 14–19
1988	First round Quarterfinals	West Chester; Portland State	W 63–24; L 13–20
1989	First round Quarterfinals; Semifinals; National championship game	Alabama A&M; North Dakota State; Angelo State; Mississippi College	W 33–9; W 21–17; W 34–16; L 0–3
1990	First round Quarterfinals	North Alabama; Mississippi College	W 38–14; L 7–14
1991	First round Quarterfinals; Semifinals; National championship game	Winston-Salem State; Mississippi College; Indiana (PA); Pittsburg State	W 49–24; W 35–7; W 27–20; L 6–23
1992	First round Quarterfinals; Semifinals; National championship game	Savannah State; North Alabama; New Haven; Pittsburg State	W 41–16; W 14–12; W 46–35; W 17–13

== Rivalries ==
=== Samford ===
This unnamed rivalry started in 1904, when Jacksonville wore blue and gold as the Eagle Owls and Samford University was still named Howard College. Jacksonville State leads the series 23–21–2.

=== Troy ===
Jacksonville State used to play Troy in the annual Battle for the Ol' School Bell. The schools first played in 1924, and this was one of the fiercest rivalries for both schools. The game has not been played since 2001, after Troy moved up to the FBS. Jacksonville State leads the series 32–29–2.

== Notable former players ==
Notable alumni include:

- Orlando Adams (drafted by Philadelphia Eagles)
- Jesse Baker (drafted by Houston Oilers)
- Alan Bonner (drafted by Houston Texans)
- Dieter Brock (signed by Los Angeles Rams)
- A.J. Davis (signed by New Orleans Saints)
- Eric Davis (drafted by San Francisco 49ers)
- Casey Dunn (signed by Washington Redskins)
- Riley Green (country music singer, played quarterback)
- David Gulledge (drafted by Washington Redskins)
- Jaylen Hill (signed by Baltimore Ravens)
- Peter Little Horn (signed by Detroit Lions)
- Delvin Hughley (signed by Denver Broncos)
- Chris Landrum (signed by San Diego Chargers)
- Darrell Malone (drafted by Kansas City Chiefs)
- Keith McKeller (drafted by Buffalo Bills)
- Siran Neal (drafted by Buffalo Bills)
- Ryan Perrilloux (signed by New York Giants)
- Troymaine Pope (signed by Seattle Seahawks)
- Taureen Rhetta (signed by Kansas City Chiefs)
- David Robinson (drafted by Kansas City Chiefs)
- James Shaw (signed by Pittsburgh Steelers)
- Roc Thomas (signed by Minnesota Vikings)
- Mike Wallace (drafted by Cleveland Browns)
- Pierre Warren (signed by New Orleans Saints)
- Mark Word (signed by Cleveland Browns)
- Alvin Wright (signed by Los Angeles Rams)

== Future non-conference opponents ==
Announced schedules as of October 6, 2026.

2027	2028	2029	2030	2031
at Indiana	UAB	at Auburn		at Ole Miss
at UAB	at Buffalo	North Dakota State		Buffalo
South Alabama				at South Alabama
