= List of Florida State Seminoles football seasons =

The Florida State Seminoles football team has represented Florida State University in collegiate football since 1947, competing as Florida State College from 1902-1904. The following is a list of Florida State Seminoles football seasons.

== Seasons ==
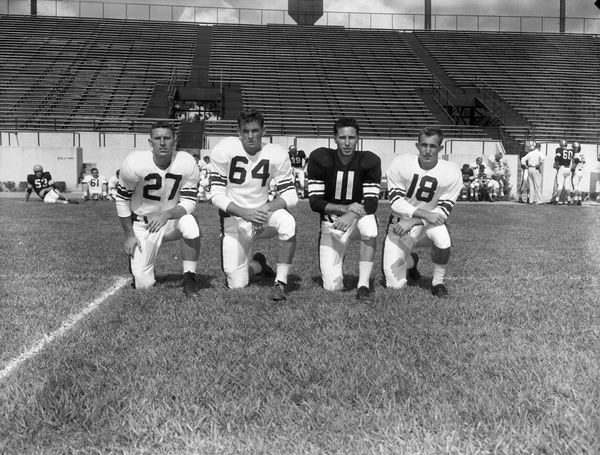
Members of the 1954 Florida State football team

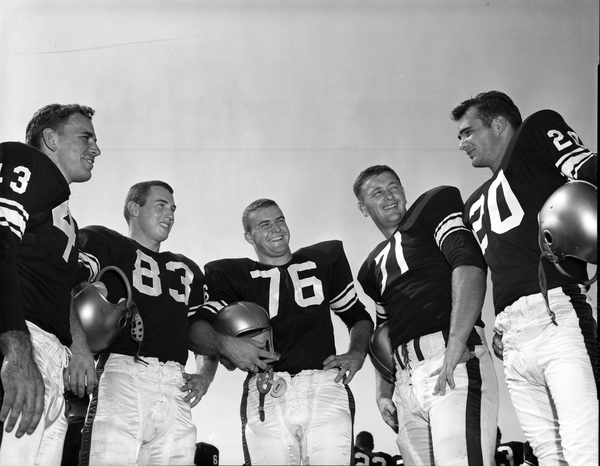
Members of the 1957 Florida State football team

Year	Coach	Overall	Conference	Standing	Bowl/playoffs	Coaches^{#}	AP^{°}
W.W. Hughes (Southern Intercollegiate Athletic Association) (1902–1903)
1902	W.W. Hughes	2–1					
1903	W.W. Hughes	3–2–1			T Times-Union Cup		
Jack Forsythe (Southern Intercollegiate Athletic Association) (1904)
1904	Jack Forsythe	2–3					
1906–46	No team						
Ed Williamson (Independent) (1947)
1947	Ed Williamson	0–5					
Don Veller (Dixie Conference) (1948–1950)
1948	Don Veller	7–1	4–0	1st			
1949	Don Veller	9–1	4–0	1st	W Cigar		
1950	Don Veller	8–0	4–0	1st			
Don Veller (Independent) (1951–1952)
1951	Don Veller	6–2					
1952	Don Veller	1–8–1					
Tom Nugent (Independent) (1953–1958)
1953	Tom Nugent	5–5					
1954	Tom Nugent	8–4			L Sun		
1955	Tom Nugent	5–5					
1956	Tom Nugent	5–4–1					
1957	Tom Nugent	4–6					
1958	Tom Nugent	7–4			L Bluegrass		
Perry Moss (Independent) (1959)
1959	Perry Moss	4–6					
Bill Peterson (Independent) (1960–1970)
1960	Bill Peterson	3–6–1					
1961	Bill Peterson	4–5–1					
1962	Bill Peterson	4–3–3					
1963	Bill Peterson	4–5–1					
1964	Bill Peterson	9–1–1			W Gator	11	
1965	Bill Peterson	4–5–1					
1966	Bill Peterson	6–5			L Sun		
1967	Bill Peterson	7–2–2			T Gator	15	
1968	Bill Peterson	8–3			L Peach	14	
1969	Bill Peterson	6–3–1					
1970	Bill Peterson	7–4					
Larry Jones (Independent) (1971–1973)
1971	Larry Jones	8–4			L Fiesta	19	
1972	Larry Jones	7–4					
1973	Larry Jones	0–11					
Darrell Mudra (Independent) (1974–1975)
1974	Darrell Mudra	1–10					
1975	Darrell Mudra	3–8					
Bobby Bowden (Independent) (1976–1991)
1976	Bobby Bowden	5–6					
1977	Bobby Bowden	10–2			W Tangerine	11	14
1978	Bobby Bowden	8–3					
1979	Bobby Bowden	11–1			L Orange	8	6
1980	Bobby Bowden	10–2			L Orange	5	5
1981	Bobby Bowden	6–5					
1982	Bobby Bowden	9–3			W Gator	10	13
1983	Bobby Bowden	8–4 (Note: The 1983 season includes a forfeit win vs. Tulane.)			W Peach		
1984	Bobby Bowden	7–3–2			T Citrus	19	17
1985	Bobby Bowden	9–3			W Gator	13	15
1986	Bobby Bowden	7–4–1			W All-American	20	
1987	Bobby Bowden	11–1			W Fiesta	2	2
1988	Bobby Bowden	11–1			W Sugar	3	3
1989	Bobby Bowden	10–2			W Fiesta	2	3
1990	Bobby Bowden	10–2			W Blockbuster	4	4
1991	Bobby Bowden	11–2			W Cotton	4	4
Bobby Bowden (ACC) (1992–2009)
1992	Bobby Bowden	11–1	8–0	1st	W Orange^{†}	2	2
1993	Bobby Bowden	12–1	8–0	1st	W Orange^{†}	1	1
1994	Bobby Bowden	10–1–1	8–0	1st	W Sugar^{†}	5	4
1995	Bobby Bowden	10–2	7–1	1st	W Orange^{†}	5	4
1996	Bobby Bowden	11–1	8–0	1st	L Sugar^{†}	3	3
1997	Bobby Bowden	11–1	8–0	1st	W Sugar^{†}	3	3
1998	Bobby Bowden	11–2	7–1	1st	L Fiesta^{†}	3	3
1999	Bobby Bowden	12–0	8–0	1st	W Sugar^{†}	1	1
2000	Bobby Bowden	11–2	8–0	1st	L Orange^{†}	4	5
2001	Bobby Bowden	8–4	6–2	2nd	W Gator	15	15
2002	Bobby Bowden	9–5	7–1	1st	L Sugar^{†}	23	21
2003	Bobby Bowden	10–3	7–1	1st	L Orange^{†}	10	11
2004	Bobby Bowden	9–3	6–2	2nd	W Gator	14	15
2005	Bobby Bowden	8–5	5–3	1st (Atlantic)	L Orange^{†}	23	23
2006	Bobby Bowden	7–6 (Note: FSU was forced to vacate five wins in 2006 and seven wins in 2007 due to an academic cheating scandal.)	3–5	5th (Atlantic)	W Emerald		
2007	Bobby Bowden	7–6	4–4	4th (Atlantic)	L Music City		
2008	Bobby Bowden	9–4	5–3	2nd (Atlantic)	W Champs Sports	23	21
2009	Bobby Bowden	7–6	4–4	3rd (Atlantic)	W Gator		
Jimbo Fisher (ACC) (2010–2017)
2010	Jimbo Fisher	10–4	6–2	1st (Atlantic)	W Chick-fil-A	16	17
2011	Jimbo Fisher	9–4	5–3	2nd (Atlantic)	W Champs Sports	23	23
2012	Jimbo Fisher	12–2	7–1	1st (Atlantic)	W Orange^{†}	8	10
2013	Jimbo Fisher	14–0	8–0	1st (Atlantic)	W BCS NCG^{†}	1	1
2014	Jimbo Fisher	13–1	8–0	1st (Atlantic)	L Rose^{†} (CFP Semifinal)	6	5
2015	Jimbo Fisher	10–3	6–2	2nd (Atlantic)	L Peach^{†}	14	14
2016	Jimbo Fisher	10–3	5–3	3rd (Atlantic)	W Orange^{†}	8	8
2017	Jimbo Fisher (Note: Following the game against Florida, Jimbo Fisher resigned as coach; associate coach Odell Haggins was named interim head coach for the remainder of the season.)	7–6	3–5	6th (Atlantic)	W Independence		
Willie Taggart (ACC) (2018–2019)
2018	Willie Taggart	5–7	3–5	5th (Atlantic)			
2019	Willie Taggart (Note: On November 3, 2019, Taggart was fired after losing to Miami (FL) and falling to 4–5 on the season and 9–12 overall. Defensive line coach Odell Haggins was named interim head coach for the remainder of the season, for the second time during his tenure with the program.)	6–7	4–4	4th (Atlantic)	L Sun		
Mike Norvell (ACC) (2020–2026)
2020	Mike Norvell	3–6	2–6	13th			
2021	Mike Norvell	5–7	4–4	5th (Atlantic)			
2022	Mike Norvell	10–3	5–3	2nd (Atlantic)	W Cheez-It	10	11
2023	Mike Norvell	13–1	8–0	1st	L Orange^{†}	6	6
2024	Mike Norvell	2–10	1–7	17th			
2025	Mike Norvell	5–7	2–6	13th			
2026	Mike Norvell (Note: After the eighth game of the 2026 season, Norvell was fired with Rick Stockstill taking over as interim head coach.)	5–6	3–5				
Total:		600–309–18					
National championship Conference title Conference division title or championship game berth
^{†}Indicates Bowl Coalition, Bowl Alliance, BCS, or CFP / New Years' Six bowl.; ^{#}Rankings from final Coaches Poll.; ^{°}Rankings from final AP Poll.
