= 1950 Jacksonville State Gamecocks football team =

American college football season

1950 Jacksonville State Gamecocks football

Paper Bowl, L 6–7 vs. Pensacola Alumni
- Conference: Alabama Intercollegiate Conference
- Record: 6–2–1 (2–1 AIC)
- Head coach: Don Salls (5th season)
- Home stadium: College Bowl

The 1950 Jacksonville State Gamecocks football team represented Jacksonville State Teachers College (now known as Jacksonville State University) as a member of the Alabama Intercollegiate Conference (AIC) during the 1950 college football season. Led by fifth-year head coach Don Salls, the Gamecocks compiled an overall record of 6–2–1 with a mark of 2–1 in conference play.

== Schedule ==
Date	Time	Opponent	Site	Result	Attendance	Source
September 30		at Maryville (TN)*	Maryville, TN	W 21–7		
October 7		Tampa*	College Bowl; Jacksonville, AL	W 20–7		
October 14		Troy State	College Bowl; Jacksonville, AL (rivalry)	W 9–0		
October 19		St. Bernard	College Bowl; Jacksonville, AL	W 20–0	300	
October 28		at Austin Peay*	Municipal Stadium; Clarksville, TN	T 13–13		
November 4		South Georgia*	College Bowl; Jacksonville, AL	W 25–14		
November 18	8:00 p.m.	at Florence State	Coffee Stadium; Florence, AL	L 0–6		
November 22		at Howard (AL)*	Legion Field; Birmingham, AL (rivalry)	W 28–7	1,500	
December 2		vs. Pensacola Alumni*	Tiger Stadium; Pensacola, FL (Paper Bowl)	L 6–7	3,600	
*Non-conference game; All times are in Central time
