= 1950 Florence State Lions football team =

American college football season

1950 Florence State Lions football
- Conference: Alabama Intercollegiate Conference
- Record: 5–4 (2–2 AIC)
- Head coach: Hal Self (2nd season)
- Home stadium: Coffee Stadium

The 1950 Florence State Lions football team represented Florence State Teacher's College—now known as the University of North Alabama—as a member of the Alabama Intercollegiate Conference (AIC) during the 1950 college football season. Led by second-year head coach Hal Self, the Lions compiled an overall record of 5–4 with a mark of 2–2 in conference play. Florence State played home games at Coffee Stadium in Florence, Alabama.

== Schedule ==
Date	Time	Opponent	Site	Result	Attendance	Source
September 23	8:00 p.m.	Ozarks (AR)*	Coffee Stadium; Florence, AL	W 2–0	4,500	
September 30		at Austin Peay*	Clarksville Municipal Stadium; Clarksville, TN	L 0–6		
October 7		vs. Howard (AL)*	Decatur, AL	W 7–0		
October 14	8:00 p.m.	St. Bernard	Coffee Stadium; Florence, AL	W 48–0	2,000	
October 21		at Livingston	Livingston, AL (rivalry)	L 0–19	3,000	
October 28	8:00 p.m.	Troy State^{†}	Coffee Stadium; Florence, AL	L 0–19	6,000	
November 4		at Middle Tennessee State*	Horace Jones Field; Murfreesboro, TN	L 14–26		
November 11	8:00 p.m.	Bethel (TN)*	Coffee Stadium; Florence, AL	W 39–2		
November 18	8:00 p.m.	Jacksonville State	Coffee Stadium; Florence, AL	W 6–0		
*Non-conference game; ^{†}Homecoming; All times are in Central time
