= 1948 Troy State Red Wave football team =

American college football season

1948 Troy State Red Wave football

Paper Bowl, L 0–19 vs. Jacksonville State
- Conference: Alabama Intercollegiate Conference
- Record: 6–5 (3–1 AIC)
- Head coach: Fred McCollum (2nd season)
- Home stadium: Pace Field

The 1948 Troy State Red Wave football team represented Troy State Teachers College (now known as Troy University) as a member of the Alabama Intercollegiate Conference (AIC) during the 1948 college football season. Led by second-year head coach Fred McCollum, the Red Wave compiled an overall record of 6–5, with a mark of 3–1 in conference play, and lost to Jacksonville State in the Paper Bowl.

== Schedule ==
| Date | Opponent | Site | Result | Source |
|---|---|---|---|---|
| September 18 | Union (TN)* | Pace Field; Troy, AL | W 15–6 | |
| September 25 | at Southwestern Louisiana* | McNaspy Stadium; Lafayette, LA | L 19–26 | |
| October 1 | at Marion | Johnson Field; Marion, AL | W 19–6 | |
| October 9 | Austin Peay* | Pace Field; Troy, AL | L 7–18 | |
| October 14 | at Jacksonville State | College Bowl; Jacksonville, AL (rivalry) | L 13–25 | |
| October 23 | Livingston State | Pace Field; Troy, AL | W 14–0 | |
| October 30 | St. Bernard | Pace Field; Troy, AL | W 33–0 | |
| November 6 | at West Georgia* | Carrollton, GA | W 33–7 | |
| November 13 | Alabama B team* | Pace Field; Troy, AL | W 6–0 | |
| November 27 | Florida State* | Wiregrass Stadium; Dothan, AL | L 13–20 | |
| December 18 | vs. Jacksonville State* | Pensacola H.S. Stadium; Pensacola, FL (Paper Bowl) | L 0–19 | |
*Non-conference game
