= 1949 Jacksonville State Gamecocks football team =

American college football season

1949 Jacksonville State Gamecocks football

Paper Bowl, W 12–7 vs. Livingston State
- Conference: Alabama Intercollegiate Conference
- Record: 6–3 (3–2 AIC)
- Head coach: Don Salls (4th season)
- Home stadium: College Bowl

1949 Alabama Intercollegiate Conference football standings
	Conf.					Overall
Team	W		L		T	W		L		T
Livingston State +	3	–	0	–	1	7	–	2	–	1
Troy State +	2	–	0	–	1	6	–	3	–	1
Jacksonville State	3	–	2	–	0	6	–	3	–	0
Marion	1	–	1	–	0	?	–	?	–	?
Florence State	1	–	3	–	0	4	–	5	–	0
Athens	0	–	2	–	0	5	–	4	–	1
St. Bernard	0	–	3	–	0	?	–	?	–	?
+ – Conference co-champions

The 1949 Jacksonville State Gamecocks football team represented Jacksonville State Teachers College (now known as Jacksonville State University) as a member of the Alabama Intercollegiate Conference (AIC) during the 1949 college football season. Led by fourth-year head coach Don Salls, the Gamecocks compiled an overall record of 6–3 with a mark of 3–2 in conference play, placing third in the AIC.

== Schedule ==
Date	Time	Opponent	Site	Result	Attendance	Source
September 29	8:00 p.m.	Florence State	College Bowl; Jacksonville, AL	W 12–7	5,000	
October 8	8:00 p.m.	at Livingston State	McConnell Field; Livingston, AL	L 7–14	3,500	
October 15		at Troy State	Pace Field; Troy, AL (rivalry)	L 6–27		
October 22		at St. Bernard	Cullman, AL	W 38–0		
October 27		Austin Peay*	College Bowl; Jacksonville, AL	W 19–7		
November 5		Athens State	College Bowl; Jacksonville, AL	W 42–0		
November 12		at Southeastern Louisiana*	Strawberry Stadium; Hammond, LA	L 14–20		
November 19		Maryville (TN)*	College Bowl; Jacksonville, AL	W 20–14	5,000	
December 16		vs. Livingston State*	Pensacola High School Stadium; Pensacola, FL (Paper Bowl)	W 12–7	3,000	
*Non-conference game; All times are in Central time
