= List of Charlotte 49ers football seasons =

The following is a list of seasons completed by the Charlotte 49ers football team.

The school that would eventually evolve into the University of North Carolina at Charlotte, the Charlotte Center for the University of North Carolina, began playing football in its first three years of existence, but folded the program in 1949. The football program was restarted in 2013. The 49ers are a member of the FBS's American Athletic Conference since 2023. Before that they were members of Conference USA from 2015 to 2022, after they moved up a subdivision after two years as a Division I FCS independent. The team plays their home games in 15,314-seat Jerry Richardson Stadium.

== Seasons ==
Year	Coach	Overall	Conference	Standing	Bowl/playoffs	Coaches^{#}	AP^{°}
Independent (1946–1948)
1946	Arthur Deremer	2–4					
1947	Marion Woods	1–3					
1948	Carol Blackwell	0–5					
FCS Independent (2013–2014)
2013	Brad Lambert	5–6					
2014	Brad Lambert	5–6					
Conference USA (2015–2023)
2015	Brad Lambert	2–10	0–8	7th (East)			
2016	Brad Lambert	4–8	3–5	5th (East)			
2017	Brad Lambert	1–11	1–7	7th (East)			
2018	Brad Lambert	5–7	4–4	4th (East)			
2019	Will Healy	7–6	5–3	4th (East)	L Bahamas Bowl		
2020	Will Healy	2–4	2–2	4th (East)			
2021	Will Healy	5–7	3–5	T–5th (East)			
2022	Will Healy/Pete Rossomando	3–9	2–6	10th			
American Athletic Conference (2023–present)
2023	Biff Poggi	3–9	2–6	T–11th			
2024	Biff Poggi/Tim Brewster	5–7	4–4	T–6th			
2025	Tim Albin	1–11	0–8	14th			
Total:		51–113					
National championship Conference title Conference division title or championship game berth
^{†}Indicates Bowl Coalition, Bowl Alliance, BCS, or CFP / New Years' Six bowl.; ^{#}Rankings from final Coaches Poll.
