= 1949 Florence State Lions football team =

American college football season

1949 Florence State Lions football
- Conference: Alabama Intercollegiate Conference
- Record: 4–5 (1–3 AIC)
- Head coach: Hal Self (1st season)
- Home stadium: Coffee Stadium

1949 Alabama Intercollegiate Conference football standings
	Conf.					Overall
Team	W		L		T	W		L		T
Livingston State +	3	–	0	–	1	7	–	2	–	1
Troy State +	2	–	0	–	1	6	–	3	–	1
Jacksonville State	3	–	2	–	0	6	–	3	–	0
Marion	1	–	1	–	0	?	–	?	–	?
Florence State	1	–	3	–	0	4	–	5	–	0
Athens	0	–	2	–	0	5	–	4	–	1
St. Bernard	0	–	3	–	0	?	–	?	–	?
+ – Conference co-champions

The 1949 Florence State Lions football team represented Florence State Teacher's College—now known as the University of North Alabama—as a member of the Alabama Intercollegiate Conference (AIC) during the 1949 college football season. Led by first-year head coach Hal Self, the Lions compiled an overall record of 4–5 with a mark of 1–3 in conference play, placing fifth in the AIC. Florence State played home games at Coffee Stadium in Florence, Alabama.

== Schedule ==
Date	Time	Opponent	Site	Result	Attendance	Source
September 29	8:00 p.m.	at Jacksonville State	College Bowl; Jacksonville, AL	L 7–12	5,000	
October 8	7:30 p.m.	Howard (AL)*	Coffee Stadium; Florence, AL	W 18–7	5,500	
October 15		at St. Bernard	Cullman, AL	W 28–0		
October 22	8:00 p.m.	Livingston State	Coffee Stadium; Florence, AL (rivalry)	L 13–14		
October 29	8:00 p.m.	at Troy State	Pace Field; Troy, AL	L 6–19		
November 5	8:00 p.m.	Middle Tennessee*	Coffee Stadium; Florence, AL	L 16–55		
November 12		at Bethel (TN)*	McKenzie, TN	W 32–0		
November 19	8:00 p.m.	Tennessee Junior*^{†}	Coffee Stadium; Florence, AL	W 53–0		
November 26	8:00 p.m.	Austin Peay*	Coffee Stadium; Florence, AL	L 6–27		
*Non-conference game; ^{†}Homecoming; All times are in Central time

== Roster ==
1949 Florence State Lions Football
Quarterbacks: Joe Brewer – Freshman (5'11, 180); John B. Hall – Junior (5'10, 172); Jack Whitten – Freshman (5'11, 178); Left halfbacks: Carl Boley – Junior (5'9, 170); Edward Burrows – Freshman (5'11, 160); Bimol Poole – Freshman (6'0, 170); William Smith– Freshman (5'11, 160); Right halfbacks: Dale Hamilton Jr – Sophomore (5'9, 160); Max McBrayer– Senior (5'9, 150); William Parker – Sophomore (5'8, 156); Richard Pollard – Sophomore (6'1, 178); L.L. Whitten – Freshman (5'8, 160); Fullbacks: John Benton – Freshman (5'10, 165); Karl Bradley – Sophomore (5'8, 150); Homer Hamilton Jr – Sophomore (6'0, 190); James Segers – Freshman (5'8, 153); James Snoddy – Freshman (5'10, 186)	Centers: John Braswell Jr – Sophomore (6'1, 183); Glen Graham – Freshman (6'0, 185); Brooks Jones – Senior (6'2, 195); William Wade – Freshman (6'2, 215); Guards: Thomas DaWeese – Sophomore (5'10, 175); William Doty – Sophomore (5'6, 170); Lelton Gray – Freshman (5'7, 176); Jack King – Sophomore (5'10, 210); Gene Lentz – Freshman (5'8, 185); Durell Mock – Freshman (6'0, 184); William Sanders – Freshman (6'1, 182); Tackles: Charles Beard – Junior (5'11, 180); Caldwell Hollingsworth – Freshman (5'10, 207); Baker Hollis – Sophomore (6'4, 226); Orion Hyde – Sophomore (5'11, 201); Gene Turner – Freshman (6'2, 187); Bobby Wade– Freshman (6'4, 186)	Ends: Robert Allen – Freshman (6'5, 183); Aubrey Free – Freshman (6'2, 185); Jones Graham – Sophomore (6'1, 175); Dudley Hargrove – Freshman (6'1, 170); Billy Norris – Freshman (6'1, 176); Herbet Sanford – Sophomore (6'2, 190)

== Coaching staff ==
Florence State Lions coaches

Head coach

- Hal Self

Assistant coaches

- George Weeks
- Edmond Billingham
