= 1948 Jacksonville State Gamecocks football team =

American college football season

1948 Jacksonville State Gamecocks football

AIC champion

Paper Bowl, W 19–0 vs. Troy State
- Conference: Alabama Intercollegiate Conference
- Record: 8–1–1 (4–0 AIC)
- Head coach: Don Salls (3rd season)
- Home stadium: College Bowl

The 1948 Jacksonville State Gamecocks football team represented Jacksonville State Teachers College (now known as Jacksonville State University) as a member of the Alabama Intercollegiate Conference (AIC) during the 1948 college football season. Led by third-year head coach Don Salls, the Gamecocks compiled an overall record of 8–1–1 with a mark of 4–0 in conference play, and finished as AIC champion.

== Schedule ==
Date	Opponent	Site	Result	Source
October 1	at Gordon Military College*	Barnesville, GA	W 45–0	
October 7	Livingston State	College Bowl; Jacksonville, AL	W 7–0	
October 14	Troy State	College Bowl; Jacksonville, AL (rivalry)	W 25–13	
October 23	St. Bernard	College Bowl; Jacksonville, AL	W 25–13	
October 30	at Austin Peay*	Municipal Stadium; Clarksville, TN	L 13–14	
November 4	Marion	College Bowl; Jacksonville, AL	W 28–0	
November 11	vs. Southeastern Louisiana*	Murphree Stadium; Gadsden, AL	T 7–7	
November 18	at Howard (AL)*	College Bowl; Jacksonville, AL (rivalry)	W 14–0	
December 3	at Athens*	Athens H.S. Stadium; Athens, AL	W 7–0	
December 18	vs. Troy State*	Pensacola H.S. Stadium; Pensacola, FL (Paper Bowl)	W 19–0	
*Non-conference game
