= 1949 Livingston State Tigers football team =

American college football season

1949 Livingston State Tigers football

AIC co-champion

Paper Bowl, L 7–12 vs. Jacksonville State
- Conference: Alabama Intercollegiate Conference
- Record: 7–2–1 (3–0–1 AIC)
- Head coach: George Darrow (1st season; first 2 games); Vaughn Mancha (1st season; final 8 games)
- Home stadium: McConnell Field

1949 Alabama Intercollegiate Conference football standings
	Conf.					Overall
Team	W		L		T	W		L		T
Livingston State +	3	–	0	–	1	7	–	2	–	1
Troy State +	2	–	0	–	1	6	–	3	–	1
Jacksonville State	3	–	2	–	0	6	–	3	–	0
Marion	1	–	1	–	0	?	–	?	–	?
Florence State	1	–	3	–	0	4	–	5	–	0
Athens	0	–	2	–	0	5	–	4	–	1
St. Bernard	0	–	3	–	0	?	–	?	–	?
+ – Conference co-champions

The 1949 Livingston State Tigers football team represented Livingston State Teachers College—now known as the University of West Alabama—as a member of the Alabama Intercollegiate Conference (AIC) during the 1949 college football season. The Tigers compiled an overall record of 7–2–1 with a mark of 3–0–1 in conference play, sharing the AIC title with Troy State. Livingston State was in invited to the Paper Bowl, where the Tigers lost to Jacksonville State, a fellow member of the AIC that they had defeated during the regular season. The team played home games at McConnell Field in Livingston, Alabama.

Livingston State began the season under first-year head coach George Darrow, who died of a heart attack on September 25, a day after the second game of the season. Vaughn Mancha, who had served as the team's line coach, succeed Darrow as head coach.

== Schedule ==
Date	Time	Opponent	Site	Result	Attendance	Source
September 17	8:00 p.m.	at Southeastern Louisiana*	Strawberry Stadium; Hammond, LA	L 12–41		
September 24		at Athens	Athens High Stadium; Athens, AL	W 34–0		
October 1	8:00 p.m.	Delta State*	McConnell Field; Livingston, AL	W 7–0		
October 8	8:00 p.m.	Jacksonville State^{†}	McConnell Field; Livingston, AL	W 14–7	3,500	
October 14		at Northeast Center*	Brown Field; Monroe, LA	W 7–6		
October 22	8:00 p.m.	at Florence State	Coffee Stadium; Florence, AL (rivalry)	W 14–13		
October 29		at Chipola Junior College*	Marianna, FL	W 20–13		
November 5	8:00 p.m.	vs. Florida State*	Memorial Stadium; Selma, AL	W 13–6	1,000	
November 19	8:00 p.m.	Troy State	McConnell Field; Livingston, AL	T 7–7		
December 16		vs. Jacksonville State*	Pensacola High School Stadium; Pensacola, FL (Paper Bowl)	L 7–12	3,000	
*Non-conference game; ^{†}Homecoming; All times are in Central time
