= 1949 Troy State Red Wave football team =

American college football season

1949 Troy State Red Wave football

AIC co-champion
- Conference: Alabama Intercollegiate Conference
- Record: 6–3–1 (2–0–1 AIC)
- Head coach: Fred McCollum (3rd season)
- Home stadium: Pace Field

1949 Alabama Intercollegiate Conference football standings
	Conf.					Overall
Team	W		L		T	W		L		T
Livingston State +	3	–	0	–	1	7	–	2	–	1
Troy State +	2	–	0	–	1	6	–	3	–	1
Jacksonville State	3	–	2	–	0	6	–	3	–	0
Marion	1	–	1	–	0	?	–	?	–	?
Florence State	1	–	3	–	0	4	–	5	–	0
Athens	0	–	2	–	0	5	–	4	–	1
St. Bernard	0	–	3	–	0	?	–	?	–	?
+ – Conference co-champions

The 1949 Troy State Red Wave football team represented Troy State Teachers College (now known as Troy University) as a member of the Alabama Intercollegiate Conference (AIC) during the 1949 college football season. Led by third-year head coach Fred McCollum, the Red Wave compiled an overall record of 6–3–1 with a mark of 2–0–1 in conference play, sharing the AIC title with Livingston.

== Schedule ==
Date	Time	Opponent	Site	Result	Attendance	Source
September 16		at Union (TN)*	Rothrock Field; Jackson, TN	W 33–6		
September 24		at Southwestern Louisiana*	McNaspy Stadium; Lafayette, LA	L 25–48		
October 1		Pensacola NAS*	Pace Field; Troy, AL	L 6–12		
October 8	7:00 p.m.	at Stetson*	DeLand Municipal Stadium; DeLand, FL	W 10–0	3,200	
October 15		Jacksonville State	Pace Field; Troy, AL (rivalry)	W 27–6		
October 22		Austin Peay*	Wiregrass Stadium; Dothan, AL	W 6–0		
October 29	8:00 p.m.	Florence State	Pace Field; Troy, AL	W 19–6		
November 12	8:00 p.m.	Howard (AL)*	Pace Field; Troy, AL	W 27–0		
November 19	8:00 p.m.	at Livingston State	McConnell Field; Livingston, AL	T 7–7		
November 26		at Florida State*	Centennial Field; Tallahassee, FL	L 0–20		
*Non-conference game; All times are in Central time
