= 1947 Troy State Red Wave football team =

American college football season

1947 Troy State Red Wave football
- Conference: Alabama Intercollegiate Conference
- Record: 5–4–1 (2–1–1 AIC)
- Head coach: Fred McCollum (1st season)
- Home stadium: Pace Field

The 1947 Troy State Red Wave football team represented Troy State Teachers College (now known as Troy University) as a member of the Alabama Intercollegiate Conference (AIC) during the 1947 college football season. Led by first-year head coach Fred McCollum, the Red Wave compiled an overall record of 5–4–1, with a mark of 2–1–1 in conference play.

== Schedule ==
Date	Opponent	Site	Result	Attendance	Source
September 20	Union (TN)*	Pace Field; Troy, AL	L 7–13		
September 20	Fort Benning*	Pace Field; Troy, AL	W 45–0		
October 4	Marion	Pace Field; Troy, AL	W 40–0		
October 9	at Austin Peay*	Municipal Stadium; Clarksville, TN	W 13–7		
October 18	Jacksonville State^{†}	Pace Field; Troy, AL (rivalry)	L 0–14	4,000	
October 25	at Livingston State	McConnell Field; Livingston, AL	W 12–7		
November 1	at St. Bernard	Alumni Stadium; Cullman, AL	T 0–0		
November 8	West Georgia*	Wiregrass Stadium; Dothan, AL	L 13–21	3,000	
November 15	Middle Tennessee*	Pace Field; Troy, AL (rivalry)	L 17–41		
November 27	at Florida State*	Centennial Field; Tallahassee, FL	W 36–6	3,000	
*Non-conference game; ^{†}Homecoming
