= 1947 Grambling Tigers football team =

American college football season

1947 Grambling Tigers football

Vulcan Bowl, L 21–27 vs. Wilberforce State
- Conference: Independent
- Record: 10–2
- Head coach: Eddie Robinson (5th season)

1947 Southern non-major college football independents records
	Conf.			Overall
Team	W	L	T	W		L		T
Princess Anne		–		8	–	0	–	0
Grambling		–		10	–	2	–	0
Sewanee		–		6	–	1	–	1
Memphis State		–		6	–	2	–	1
Texas State		–		9	–	3	–	0
Mississippi Southern		–		7	–	3	–	0
Oklahoma City		–		7	–	3	–	0
East Tennessee State		–		5	–	4	–	0
Catholic University		–		3	–	3	–	0
Delaware		–		4	–	4	–	0
Tennessee Tech		–		4	–	7	–	0
CCUNC		–		1	–	3	–	0
Florida State		–		0	–	5	–	0

The 1947 Grambling Tigers football team represented Grambling College (now known as Grambling State University) as an independent during the 1947 college football season. In their fifth season under head coach Eddie Robinson, the Tigers compiled an 10–2 record. In two post-season game, the Tigers defeated Bethune-Cookman in the Lions Bowl and lost to Central State in the Vulcan Bowl.

Key players included back Paul "Tank" Younger. Younger became the first player from a historically black college to play in the National Football League (NFL). He played 10 years in the NFL and was later inducted into the College Football Hall of Fame.

== Schedule ==
Date	Opponent	Site	Result	Attendance	Source
September 20	Fort Benning	Tiger Field; Grambling, LA	W 53–0		
September 27	at Tuskegee	Alumni Bowl; Tuskegee, AL	L 6–19		
October 4	Southern	Tiger Field; Grambling, LA (rivalry)	W 21–6	5,000	
October 10	at Texas State	Buffalo Stadium; Houston, TX	W 27–6	7,000	
October 18	Florida Normal^{†}	Tiger Field; Grambling, LA	W 21–0		
October 27	vs. Bishop	State Fair Stadium; Shreveport, LA (State Fair Classic)	W 20–6	8,000	
October 31	Philander Smith	Tiger Field; Grambling, LA	W 40–0		
November 8	Tillotson	Tiger Field; Grambling, LA	W 42–7		
November 15	at Prairie View A&M	Prairie View, TX	W 13–0		
November 21	vs. Butler (TX)	Tornado Stadium; Haynesville, LA	W 67–0	2,000	
December 5	Bethune–Cookman	Tech Field; Ruston, LA (Lions Bowl)	W 47–6	8,000	
January 1, 1948	vs. Wilberforce State	Rickwood Field; Birmingham, AL (Vulcan Bowl)	L 21–27	8,500	
^{†}Homecoming
