= Vaughn Mancha =

American football player, coach, and administrator (1921–2011)

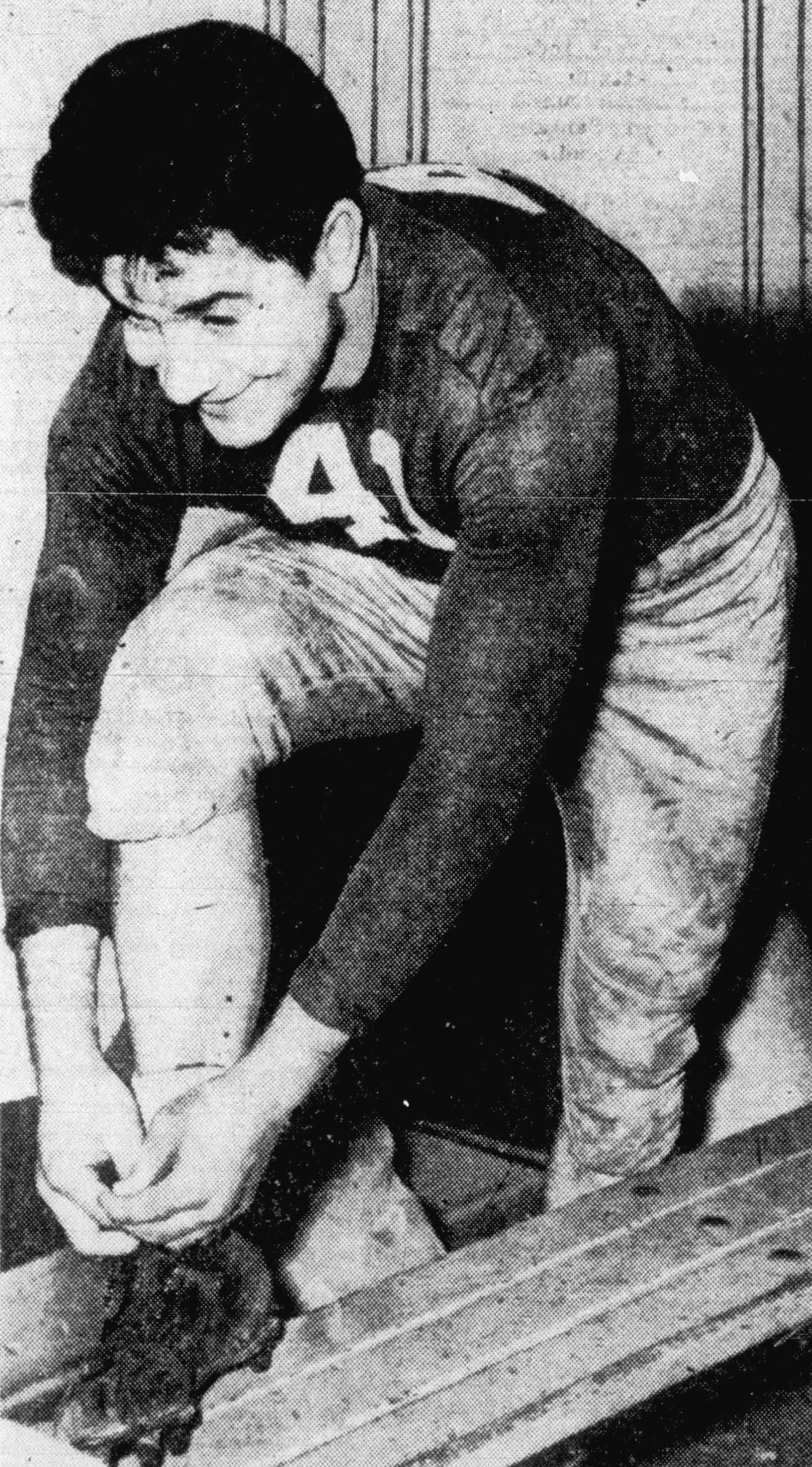
- Mancha, circa 1945

No. 41
- Positions: Center, linebacker

Personal information
- Born: October 7, 1921; Sugar Valley, Georgia, U.S.
- Died: January 27, 2011 (aged 89); Tallahassee, Florida, U.S.
- Listed height: 6 ft 1 in (1.85 m)
- Listed weight: 230 lb (104 kg)

Career information
- High school: Ramsay (Birmingham, Alabama)
- College: Alabama
- NFL draft: 1948: 1st round, 5th overall pick

Career history

Playing
- Boston Yanks (1948)

Coaching
- Livingston State (1949–1951)

Operations
- Florida State (AD, 1959–1971)

Awards and highlights
- Consensus All-American (1945); First-team All-SEC (1945); 3× Second-team All-SEC (1944, 1946, 1947)

Career NFL statistics
- Games played: 12
- Stats at Pro Football Reference
- College Football Hall of Fame

Vaughn Hall Mancha (October 7, 1921 – January 27, 2011) was an American professional football player for the Boston Yanks of the National Football League (NFL). He was inducted into the College Football Hall of Fame in 1990. He was named to the All-SEC team during his career at the University of Alabama, where he played from 1944 through 1947. Earned all-SEC & All American honors as a four-year starter at the University of Alabama; played in Rose Bowl and two Sugar Bowls; voted All-Time Sugar Bowl team. Coached football at Livingston State University, Columbia University, and Florida State University and served as FSU Athletic Director.

Other honors include induction into the Florida State Sports Hall of Fame, the Tallahassee Sports Hall of Fame, and was selected to Alabama's All-Century Team. He was married to Sybil Mancha. They have three children and four grandchildren.

== Head coaching record ==
| Year | Team | Overall | Conference | Standing | Bowl/playoffs |
|---|---|---|---|---|---|
Livingston State Tigers (Alabama Intercollegiate Conference) (1949–1951)
| 1949 | Livingston State | 6–1–1 (Note: George Darrow served as head coach for Livingston State for the first two games of the 1949 season before he died of a heart attack on September 25. Mancha succeed him as head coach. Livingston State finished the season with an 7–2–1 overall and 3–0–1 in conference play.) | 2–0–1 | T–1st | L Paper Bowl |
| 1950 | Livingston State | 6–3–1 | | | |
| 1951 | Livingston State | 5–5 | | | |
| Livingston State: | | 17–9–2 | | | |
| Total: | | 17–9–2 | | | |
National championship Conference title Conference division title or championship game berth
