= 1947 Texas State Tigers football team =

American college football season

1947 Texas State Tigers football

Prairie View Bowl, W 13–0 vs. Prairie View A&M
- Conference: Independent
- Record: 9–3
- Head coach: Eolus Von Rettig (2nd season)
- Home stadium: Buffalo Stadium

1947 Southern non-major college football independents records
	Conf.			Overall
Team	W	L	T	W		L		T
Princess Anne		–		8	–	0	–	0
Grambling		–		10	–	2	–	0
Sewanee		–		6	–	1	–	1
Memphis State		–		6	–	2	–	1
Texas State		–		9	–	3	–	0
Mississippi Southern		–		7	–	3	–	0
Oklahoma City		–		7	–	3	–	0
East Tennessee State		–		5	–	4	–	0
Catholic University		–		3	–	3	–	0
Delaware		–		4	–	4	–	0
Tennessee Tech		–		4	–	7	–	0
CCUNC		–		1	–	3	–	0
Florida State		–		0	–	5	–	0

The 1947 Texas State Tigers football team was an American football team that represented Texas State University for Negroes (now known as Texas Southern University) as an independent during the 1947 college football season. Led by second-year head coach Eolus Von Rettig, the Tigers compiled an overall record of 9–3.

== Schedule ==
Date	Opponent	Site	Result	Attendance	Source
September 27	at Southern	University Stadium; Baton Rouge, LA	L 0–51		
October 4	at Paul Quinn	Katy Park; Waco, TX	W 6–0		
October 10	Grambling	Buffalo Stadium; Houston, TX	L 6–26	7,000	
October 18	Tillotson	Buffalo Stadium; Houston, TX	W 34–6	2,500	
October 25	Samuel Huston	Buffalo Stadium; Houston, TX	W 7–0		
October 31	Prairie View A&M	Buffalo Stadium; Houston, TX (rivalry)	W 13–12		
November 8	Butler College		W 44–12		
November 15	Xavier (LA)	Buffalo Stadium; Houston, TX	W 25–0		
November 22	Texas College	Buffalo Stadium; Houston, TX	L 0–7		
November 28	Langston	Buffalo Stadium; Houston, TX	W 20–12		
December 5	Alabama State	Buffalo Stadium; Houston, TX	W 39–0		
January 1, 1948	Prairie View A&M	Buffalo Stadium; Houston, TX (Prairie View Bowl)	W 12–0		
