= 1947 Jacksonville State Gamecocks football team =

American college football season

1947 Jacksonville State Gamecocks football

AIC champion
- Conference: Alabama Intercollegiate Conference
- Record: 9–0 (3–0 AIC)
- Head coach: Don Salls (2nd season)
- Home stadium: Memorial Stadium (Anniston); College Bowl

The 1947 Jacksonville State Gamecocks football team represented Jacksonville State Teachers College (now known as Jacksonville State University) as a member of the Alabama Intercollegiate Conference (AIC) during the 1947 college football season. Led by second-year head coach Don Salls, the Gamecocks compiled an overall record of 9–0 with a mark of 3–0 in conference play, and finished as AIC champion.

== Schedule ==
Date	Time	Opponent	Site	Result	Attendance	Source
October 2		Gordon Military College*	Memorial Stadium; Anniston, AL	W 13–0		
October 18		Troy State	Pace Field; Troy, AL (rivalry)	W 14–0	4,000	
October 25		at St. Bernard	Cullman, AL	W 27–7		
November 1		Austin Peay*	Memorial Stadium; Anniston, AL	W 7–6		
November 7	8:00 p.m.	at Marion	Johnson Field; Marion, AL	W 33–13		
November 13		Pembroke State*	College Bowl; Jacksonville, AL	W 48–0		
November 20		West Georgia*	Memorial Stadium; Anniston, AL	W 31–12		
November 27		vs. Norman Park College*	Murphree Stadium; Gadsden, AL	W 45–0		
December 6		at Florida State*	Centennial Field; Tallahassee, FL	W 7–0	3,700	
*Non-conference game; All times are in Central time
