= Eric Shaw =

Eric Shaw may refer to:

- Eric Shaw (screenwriter) (born 1972), American television writer
- Eric Shaw (American football) (born 1971), American football player
- Eric Shaw (politician) (born 1936), Australian politician
