= Murder of Leslie Preer =

2001 murder in Maryland, United States

- Date: May 2, 2001
- Location: Chevy Chase, Maryland, U.S.

On May 2, 2001, 49-year-old Leslie Preer was murdered in her residence in Chevy Chase, Maryland, United States, by Eugene Gligor. Although a thorough initial investigation was conducted, the case went unresolved for over twenty years. The homicide became a cold case in Montgomery County, Maryland. In 2022, forensic DNA analysis and genetic genealogy resulted in the identification and apprehension of a suspect. Gligor was arrested in 2024, and pled guilty to Preer's murder in 2025.

Leslie Preer
- Born: Leslie Ann Jennings
- Died: May 2, 2001; Chevy Chase, Maryland, U.S.
- Education: Pensacola High School; University of Florida

== Background ==
Preer graduated from Pensacola High School in 1963 and completed her higher education at the University of Florida in 1973. After finishing her studies, she got married and moved to Maryland.

== Initial investigation ==
On May 2, 2001, when Preer did not report to work, her employer contacted her family. Her husband and employer subsequently went to the residence. Upon seeing blood in the house, they contacted authorities. When police arrived on the scene, they located Preer's body in the shower. The autopsy revealed that her death resulted from a violent physical assault. Investigators noted indications of a struggle within the residence, suggesting that the attack may have been personal or targeted. There was no immediate evidence of forced entry, leading to speculation that the assailant may have been acquainted with the home. Detectives gathered physical evidence, including biological samples believed to belong to the assailant. They conducted interviews with family members, neighbors, employees, and others who had interacted with Preer recently. Despite the collection of evidence, investigators were unable to link the DNA of the sample found on the scene to any suspect using the available databases at that time.

Following several months of investigation that yielded little progress, the case was classified as a cold case for over two decades. Her death was one of six homicides of women in Montgomery County in 1999-2001 that were unsolved as of 2001, but believed to be unrelated to each other. Throughout the years, law enforcement periodically revisited the case as new methodologies emerged.

== Breakthrough ==
In September 2022, detectives from the Cold Case Section of the Montgomery County Police revisited DNA evidence that had been gathered in 2001, specifically blood found in three separate rooms and scrapings taken from beneath Preer’s fingernails. They worked in collaboration with Othram Inc., a private laboratory.

The laboratory identified a number of DNA matches within a consumer database. While many of these matches were distant, the most notable match led investigators to a family lineage in Romania. Detectives constructed a comprehensive family tree, ultimately identifying American relatives with the surname Gligor and cross-referencing it with the original case file from 2001. They uncovered a tip from a neighbor who, nine months after the murder, suggested that Preer’s daughter’s ex-boyfriend, Eugene Gligor, might be involved.

Investigators placed him under surveillance to collect discarded DNA. They tracked Gligor to Dulles International Airport and monitored through surveillance cameras as he drank from a plastic water bottle and subsequently discarded it in a trash bin. Officers quickly retrieved the bottle and swabbed it for DNA. Within a week, laboratories confirmed a positive match to the DNA found beneath Leslie Preer's fingernails and at the crime scene.

== Arrest and charges ==
Eugene Gligor was arrested on June 18, 2024 and was charged with first-degree murder.

Gligor pleaded guilty to second-degree murder following his arrest, and Montgomery County judge sentenced Gligor to 22 years in prison for the killing.
