= 1949 Millsaps Majors football team =

American college football season

1949 Millsaps Majors football
- Conference: Dixie Conference
- Record: 2–5 (0–4 Dixie)
- Head coach: Doby Bartling (4th season)
- Offensive scheme: T formation
- Home stadium: Tiger Stadium

1949 Dixie Conference football standings
	Conf.					Overall
Team	W		L		T	W		L		T
Florida State $	4	–	0	–	0	9	–	1	–	0
Howard (AL)	2	–	0	–	0	4	–	5	–	0
Stetson	2	–	2	–	0	4	–	5	–	1
Mississippi College	2	–	2	–	0	4	–	5	–	0
Tampa	0	–	2	–	0	0	–	8	–	0
Millsaps	0	–	4	–	0	2	–	5	–	0
$ – Conference champion

The 1949 Millsaps Majors football team represented Millsaps College as a member of the Dixie Conference during the 1949 college football season. Led by fourth-year head coach Doby Bartling the Majors compiled an overall record of 2–5 with a mark of 0–4 in conference play, placing last out of six teams in the Dixie Conference. Millsaps employed the T formation on offense. Millsaps played home games at Tiger Stadium in Jackson, Mississippi.

== Schedule ==
Date	Time	Opponent	Site	Result	Attendance	Source
October 1	8:00 p.m.	Stetson	Tiger Stadium; Jackson, MS	L 6–16		
October 8	2:30 p.m.	Sewanee	Tiger Stadium; Jackson, MS	L 12–21	2,000	
October 15	8:00 p.m.	Southwestern (TN)	Tiger Stadium; Jackson, MS	W 19–7	2,700	
November 1	8:15 p.m.	Mississippi College	Tiger Stadium; Jackson, MS (rivalry)	L 6–42		
November 5	2:30 p.m.	Pass Christian Merchant Marine^{†}	Tiger Stadium; Jackson, MS	W 46–0		
November 12	1:00 p.m.	at Florida State	Centennial Field; Tallahassee, FL	L 0–40	7,500	
November 19	2:00 p.m.	at Howard (AL)	Berry Field; Birmingham, AL	L 0–18	3,000	
^{†}Homecoming; All times are in Central time
