= 1947 Lafayette Leopards football team =

American college football season

1947 Lafayette Leopards football
- Conference: Middle Three Conference
- Record: 6–3 (1–1 Middle Three)
- Head coach: Ivy Williamson (1st season)
- Captain: Tod Saylor
- Home stadium: Fisher Field

1947 Middle Three Conference football standings
	Conf.					Overall
Team	W		L		T	W		L		T
Rutgers $	2	–	0	–	0	8	–	1	–	0
Lafayette	1	–	1	–	0	6	–	3	–	0
Lehigh	0	–	2	–	0	5	–	4	–	0
$ – Conference champion

The 1947 Lafayette Leopards football team was an American football team that represented Lafayette College during the 1947 college football season. In its first season under head coach Ivy Williamson, the team compiled a 6–3 record and was outscored by a total of 156 to 89. The Leopards lost their first two games under their new head coach, but then won six of seven games during the remainder of the season. The team played home games at Fisher Field in Easton, Pennsylvania.

In the final Litkenhous Ratings released in mid-December, Lafayette was ranked at No. 164 out of 500 college football teams.

== Schedule ==
Date	Opponent	Site	Result	Attendance	Source
September 27	Muhlenberg*	Fisher Field; Easton, PA	L 0–38	8,000	
October 4	at Penn*	Franklin Field; Philadelphia, PA	L 0–59	51,283	
October 11	Gettysburg*	Fisher Field; Easton, PA	W 14–13	7,000	
October 18	Bucknell*	Fisher Field; Easton, PA	W 27–7	9,000	
October 25	at Washington & Jefferson*	Washington High School Stadium; Washington, PA	W 20–12	5,500	
November 1	Syracuse*	Fisher Field; Easton, PA	W 14–7	10,000	
November 8	Rutgers	Fisher Field; Easton, PA	L 0–20	11,000	
November 15	at Fordham*	Polo Grounds; New York, NY	W 7–0	5,900	
November 22	at Lehigh	Taylor Stadium; Bethlehem, PA (rivalry)	W 7–0	16,000	
*Non-conference game
