= 1947 East Tennessee State Buccaneers football team =

American college football season

1947 East Tennessee State Buccaneers football
- Conference: Independent
- Record: 5–4
- Head coach: Loyd Roberts (1st season)
- Captains: Clyde Holsclaw; Joe Green
- Home stadium: Roosevelt/Memorial Stadium, College Stadium

1947 Southern non-major college football independents records
	Conf.			Overall
Team	W	L	T	W		L		T
Princess Anne		–		8	–	0	–	0
Grambling		–		10	–	2	–	0
Sewanee		–		6	–	1	–	1
Memphis State		–		6	–	2	–	1
Texas State		–		9	–	3	–	0
Mississippi Southern		–		7	–	3	–	0
Oklahoma City		–		7	–	3	–	0
East Tennessee State		–		5	–	4	–	0
Catholic University		–		3	–	3	–	0
Delaware		–		4	–	4	–	0
Tennessee Tech		–		4	–	7	–	0
CCUNC		–		1	–	3	–	0
Florida State		–		0	–	5	–	0

The 1947 East Tennessee State Buccaneers football team was an American football team that represented East Tennessee State College (ETSC)—now known as East Tennessee State University—as an independent during the 1947 college football season. Led by first-year head coach Loyd Roberts the Buccaneers compiled a record of 5–4. The team was co-captained by Clyde Holsclaw and Joe Green. Roberts's only assistant coach was A. W."Bud" Carpenter, a former Buccaneer player and co-captain of the 1940 team. Funding and equipping the team was still a difficult issue with the total team budget including salaries at only $6,400.

== Schedule ==
Date	Time	Opponent	Site	Result	Attendance	Source
September 27		Tennessee Wesleyan	Roosevelt Stadium; Johnson City, TN	W 14–12	1,950	
October 4	8:00 p.m.	Erskine	Roosevelt Stadium; Johnson City, TN	L 14–20		
October 10	2:00 p.m.	Salem	College Stadium; Johnson City, TN	W 14–2		
October 18		at Maryville (TN)	Maryville, TN	L 6–31		
October 25	8:00 p.m.	Carson–Newman^{†}	Memorial Stadium; Johnson City, TN	L 6–38		
October 30		at Cumberland (TN)	Lebanon, TN	W 25–0		
November 8	8:00 p.m.	at Emory and Henry	Bristol Municipal Stadium; Bristol, TN	W 13–0		
November 15		Tusculum	Memorial Stadium; Johnson City, TN	W 31–0		
November 20	8:45 p.m.	at Middle Tennessee	Horace Jones Field; Murfreesboro, TN	L 13–26		
^{†}Homecoming; All times are in Eastern time
