= Bob Trocolor =

American football player and coach (1917–1984)

Biographical details
- Born: March 31, 1917; Oak Hill, Texas, U.S.
- Died: July 27, 1984 (aged 67); Franklin Lakes, New Jersey, U.S.

Playing career

Football
- c. 1930s: Alabama
- c. 1939: Long Island
- 1942–1943: New York Giants
- 1944: Brooklyn Tigers

Baseball
- c. 1930s: Alabama
- c. 1939: Long Island
- Positions: Quarterback, halfback (football); Pitcher (baseball)

Coaching career (HC unless noted)

Football
- 1945: St. Mary HS (NJ)
- 1946: Paterson Panthers
- 1946–1948: Bergen
- 1949: Stetson
- 1955: NYMA (NY)
- 1957–1959: Passaic-Bergen County All-Stars
- 1960: Lodi Generals
- 1960: Lodi HS (NJ)
- 1963: Manchester Regional HS (NJ) (freshmen)
- 1974: William Paterson

Basketball
- 1945–1946: St. Mary HS (NJ)
- 1946–1949: Bergen
- 1949–1950: Stetson

Baseball
- 1947–1949: Bergen

Administrative career (AD unless noted)
- 1946–1949: Bergen

Head coaching record
- Overall: 2–8 (professional football); 7–12–1 (college football); 21–5 (junior college football); 6–16 (college basketball)

Robert G. Trocolor (March 31, 1917 – July 27, 1984) was an American football player and coach. He was also a college basketball and football head coach as well as movie actor.

== Playing career ==
Trocolor played college football for the Alabama Crimson Tide before transferring to play for the Long Island Blackbirds. He then went undrafted in 1942 but eventually landed a spot with the National Football League's New York Giants, for whom he played for two seasons as a substitute quarterback, punt returner and halfback. In 1944, Trocolor was traded to the Brooklyn Tigers and played in two games. The team merged with the Boston Yanks in 1945, but Trocolor did not get picked up, so his professional football career ended after three seasons.

== Coaching career ==
In 1945, Trocolor served as the head football and basketball coach for St. Mary High School in Rutherford, New Jersey. In 1946, he was hired as the head football coach for the Paterson Panthers of the American Association. In his lone season he led the team to a 2–8 record. Also in 1946, he was hired as the athletic director, football, basketball, and baseball coach for Bergen College. His contract was extended in 1948 after leading winning seasons in all three sports.

After three seasons with Bergen, Trocolor was hired as the head football and basketball coach for Stetson. He only lasted one season with Stetson as he resigned because of a family emergency.

Throughout Trocolor's coaching career, he served as a scout for the New York Giants of Major League Baseball (MLB).

Trocolor returned to coaching in 1955 as the head football coach for New York Military Academy. He also served as the head coach for the Passaic-Bergen County All-Stars, a semiprofessional team. In 1960, he coached the Lodi Generals of the Eastern Football Conference alongside Lodi High School. He returned to coaching once again in 1963, as the freshmen coach for Manchester Regional High School.

In 1974, Trocolor was hired as the first full-time head coach for William Paterson. He led the team to a 3–7 season in his only year with the team. He resigned due to the lack of cooperation from the athletic director, Art Eason.

== Acting ==
In the 1953 film Big Leaguer, Trocolor plays himself. The movie is about a group of 18- to 22-year-old men who are trying out for a Major League Baseball team, and he is one of the players.

== Head coaching record ==
=== College football ===
Year	Team	Overall	Conference	Standing	Bowl/playoffs
Stetson Hatters (Dixie Conference) (1949)
1949	Stetson	4–5–1	2–2	T–3rd	
Stetson:		4–5–1	2–2		
William Paterson Pioneers (New Jersey State Athletic Conference) (1974)
1974	William Paterson	3–7	1–4	5th	
William Paterson:		3–7	1–4		
Total:		7–12–1			

=== Junior college football ===
Year	Team	Overall	Conference	Standing	Bowl/playoffs
Bergen Cagers (Independent) (1946–1948)
1946	Bergen	6–3			
1947	Bergen	6–2			
1948	Bergen	9–0			
Bergen:		21–5			
Total:		21–5			

=== College basketball ===
Record table
Season	Team	Overall	Conference	Standing	Postseason
Stetson Hatters (Independent) (1949–1950)
1949–50	Stetson	6–16			
Stetson:		6–16			
Total:		6–16			
