= 1947 CCNY Beavers football team =

American college football season

1947 CCNY Beavers football
- Conference: Independent
- Record: 2–5–1
- Head coach: Harold J. Parker (11th season)
- Home stadium: Lewisohn Stadium; Ebbets Field

1947 Eastern non-major college football independents records
	Conf.			Overall
Team	W	L	T	W		L		T
Muhlenberg		–		9	–	1	–	0
Buffalo		–		8	–	1	–	0
Hofstra		–		5	–	3	–	0
Tufts		–		5	–	3	–	0
Franklin & Marshall		–		4	–	3	–	1
Springfield		–		4	–	4	–	0
CCNY		–		2	–	5	–	1
Bucknell		–		2	–	7	–	0
Carnegie Tech		–		0	–	6	–	0
Drexel		–		0	–	8	–	0
Rankings from AP Poll

The 1947 CCNY Beavers football team was an American football team that represented the City College of New York (CCNY) as an independent during the 1947 college football season. In their eleventh season under Harold J. Parker, the Beavers team compiled a 2–5–1 record.

== Schedule ==
Date	Opponent	Site	Result	Attendance	Source
September 27	Susquehanna	Lewisohn Stadium; New York, NY	T 9–9		
October 4	at Connecticut Teachers	Arute Field; New Britain, CT	L 0–27		
October 11	Rider	Ebbets Field; Brooklyn, NY	W 13–0	5,000	
October 18	Hofstra	Ebbets Field; Brooklyn, NY	L 16–24	7,500	
October 25	at Wagner	Staten Island, NY	W 12–6	3,500	
November 1	Brooklyn	Ebbets Field; Brooklyn, NY	L 7–38	15,000	
November 7	at West Chester	Wayne Field; West Chester, PA	L 0–47	5,000	
November 15	at East Stroudsburg	East Stroudsburg, PA	L 6–42		
