= 1947 Princess Anne Trojans football team =

American college football season

1947 Princess Anne Trojans football
- Conference: Independent
- Record: 8–0
- Head coach: J. C. Coffee (2nd season)

1947 Southern non-major college football independents records
	Conf.			Overall
Team	W	L	T	W		L		T
Princess Anne		–		8	–	0	–	0
Grambling		–		10	–	2	–	0
Sewanee		–		6	–	1	–	1
Memphis State		–		6	–	2	–	1
Texas State		–		9	–	3	–	0
Mississippi Southern		–		7	–	3	–	0
Oklahoma City		–		7	–	3	–	0
East Tennessee State		–		5	–	4	–	0
Catholic University		–		3	–	3	–	0
Delaware		–		4	–	4	–	0
Tennessee Tech		–		4	–	7	–	0
CCUNC		–		1	–	3	–	0
Florida State		–		0	–	5	–	0

The 1947 Princess Anne Trojans football team was an American football team that represented Princess Anne College (now known as University of Maryland Eastern Shore) during the 1947 college football season. In their second and final season under head coach J. C. Coffee, the team compiled an 8–0 record and outscored all opponents by a total of 206 to 32. The team played its home games at Princess Anne Stadium in Princess Anne, Maryland.

The 1947 season was the school's last under the common name Princess Anne College. It was officially known as the University of Maryland's College for Negroes at Princess Anne and had previously been known as Maryland's Agricultural and Mechanical College for Negroes, though it had been commonly referred to as Princess Anne College. In 1948, the school's president, Dr. J. T. Williams, discarded the "Princess Anne College" name because "people thought it might be a girl's finishing school . . . it embarrassed the football team."

== Schedule ==
Date	Opponent	Site	Result	Attendance	Source
September 27	at Elizabeth City State	Elizabeth City, NC	W 20–0		
October 4	St. Augustine's	Wicomico High School bowl; Salisbury, MD	W 20–12	600	
October 11	at Bordentown Institute	Bordentown, NJ	W 24–14		
October 18	at Storer	Harper's Ferry, WV	W 54–0		
October 25	Fayetteville State^{†}	Princess Anne Stadium; Princess Anne, MD	W 7–0		
November 1	at Cheyney	West Chester, PA	W 7–0		
November 15	Livingstone	Princess Anne Stadium; Princess Anne, MD	W 39–0		
November 23	Norfolk State	Princess Anne Stadium; Princess Anne, MD	W 31–6		
^{†}Homecoming
