= 1947 Mississippi Southern Southerners football team =

American college football season

1947 Mississippi Southern Southerners football
- Conference: Independent
- Record: 7–3
- Head coach: Reed Green (8th season)
- Home stadium: Faulkner Field

1947 Southern non-major college football independents records
| | Conf. | | | Overall |
| Team | W | L | T | W | | L | | T |
|---|---|---|---|---|---|---|---|---|
| Princess Anne | | – | | 8 | – | 0 | – | 0 |
| Grambling | | – | | 10 | – | 2 | – | 0 |
| Sewanee | | – | | 6 | – | 1 | – | 1 |
| Memphis State | | – | | 6 | – | 2 | – | 1 |
| Texas State | | – | | 9 | – | 3 | – | 0 |
| Mississippi Southern | | – | | 7 | – | 3 | – | 0 |
| Oklahoma City | | – | | 7 | – | 3 | – | 0 |
| East Tennessee State | | – | | 5 | – | 4 | – | 0 |
| Catholic University | | – | | 3 | – | 3 | – | 0 |
| Delaware | | – | | 4 | – | 4 | – | 0 |
| Tennessee Tech | | – | | 4 | – | 7 | – | 0 |
| CCUNC | | – | | 1 | – | 3 | – | 0 |
| Florida State | | – | | 0 | – | 5 | – | 0 |

The 1947 Mississippi Southern Southerners football team was an American football team that represented Mississippi Southern College (now known as the University of Southern Mississippi) as an independent during the 1947 college football season. In their eighth year under head coach Reed Green, the team compiled a 7–3 record.

Mississippi Southern was ranked at No. 112 (out of 500 college football teams) in the final Litkenhous Ratings for 1947.

== Schedule ==
| Date | Opponent | Site | Result | Attendance | Source |
|---|---|---|---|---|---|
| September 20 | at Alabama | Legion Field; Birmingham, AL | L 7–34 | 30,000 | |
| September 26 | at Auburn | Cramton Bowl; Montgomery, AL | W 19–13 | 15,000 | |
| October 11 | at Louisiana Tech | Tech Stadium; Ruston, LA (rivalry) | W 7–6 | 6,000 | |
| October 18 | at Southwestern Louisiana | McNaspy Stadium; Lafayette, LA | W 15–7 | | |
| October 25 | at Oklahoma City | Taft Stadium; Oklahoma City, OK | L 6–21 | 4,800 | |
| November 1 | Stephen F. Austin^{†} | Faulkner Field; Hattiesburg, MS | W 20–7 | 9,500 | |
| November 7 | Northwestern State | Faulkner Field; Hattiesburg, MS | W 20–0 | | |
| November 14 | Union (TN) | Faulkner Field; Hattiesburg, MS | W 18–0 | | |
| November 22 | at Mississippi State | Scott Field; Starkville, MS | L 7–14 | 5,000 | |
| November 27 | at Southeastern Louisiana | Strawberry Stadium; Hammond, LA | W 35–0 | | |
^{†}Homecoming
