= 1947 Delaware Fightin' Blue Hens football team =

American college football season

1947 Delaware Fightin' Blue Hens football
- Conference: Independent
- Record: 4–4
- Head coach: William D. Murray (5th season)
- Home stadium: Wilmington Ball Park

1947 Southern non-major college football independents records
	Conf.			Overall
Team	W	L	T	W		L		T
Princess Anne		–		8	–	0	–	0
Grambling		–		10	–	2	–	0
Sewanee		–		6	–	1	–	1
Memphis State		–		6	–	2	–	1
Texas State		–		9	–	3	–	0
Mississippi Southern		–		7	–	3	–	0
Oklahoma City		–		7	–	3	–	0
East Tennessee State		–		5	–	4	–	0
Catholic University		–		3	–	3	–	0
Delaware		–		4	–	4	–	0
Tennessee Tech		–		4	–	7	–	0
CCUNC		–		1	–	3	–	0
Florida State		–		0	–	5	–	0

The 1947 Delaware Fightin' Blue Hens football team was an American football team that represented the University of Delaware as an independent during the 1947 college football season. In its fifth season under head coach William D. Murray, the team compiled a 4–4 record. Walter A. Marusa and John W. Messick were the team captains.

In the final Litkenhous Ratings released in mid-December, Delaware was ranked at No. 129 out of 500 college football teams.

The team played its home games at Wilmington Park in Wilmington, Delaware.

== Schedule ==
Date	Opponent	Site	Result	Attendance	Source
September 27	Pennsylvania Military	Wilmington Ball Park; Wilmington, DE	W 25–13	11,000	
October 3	at Maryland	Byrd Stadium; College Park, MD	L 19–43	16,460	
October 11	at Bucknell	Memorial Stadium; Lewisburg, PA	L 12–13		
October 25	Gettysburg	Wilmington Ball Park; Wilmington, DE	W 26–0	7,000	
November 1	Franklin & Marshall	Wilmington Ball Park; Wilmington, DE	W 26–6	6,500	
November 8	Western Maryland	Wilmington Ball Park; Wilmington, DE	W 26–0	5,000	
November 15	at Muhlenberg	Muhlenberg Field; Allentown, PA	L 14–20	8,000	
November 22	Washington and Lee	Wilmington Ball Park; Wilmington, DE	L 13–18	7,500	
