= 1947 Muhlenberg Mules football team =

American college football season

1947 Muhlenberg Mules football
- Conference: Independent
- Record: 9–1
- Head coach: Ben Schwartzwalder (2nd season)

1947 Eastern non-major college football independents records
	Conf.			Overall
Team	W	L	T	W		L		T
Muhlenberg		–		9	–	1	–	0
Buffalo		–		8	–	1	–	0
Hofstra		–		5	–	3	–	0
Tufts		–		5	–	3	–	0
Franklin & Marshall		–		4	–	3	–	1
Springfield		–		4	–	4	–	0
CCNY		–		2	–	5	–	1
Bucknell		–		2	–	7	–	0
Carnegie Tech		–		0	–	6	–	0
Drexel		–		0	–	8	–	0
Rankings from AP Poll

The 1947 Muhlenberg Mules football team was an American football team represented Muhlenberg College during the 1947 college football season. In its second season under head coach Ben Schwartzwalder, the team compiled a 9–1 record and outscored opponents by a total of 368 to 49. The team's only loss was to Temple by a 7–6 score. The team was invited to play in the 1948 Tangerine Bowl, but the school's athletic committee declined the invitation.

Muhlenberg was ranked at No. 68 (out of 500 college football teams) in the final Litkenhous Ratings for 1947.

The team played its home games at Muhlenberg Field in Allentown, Pennsylvania.

== Schedule ==
Date	Opponent	Site	Result	Attendance	Source
September 27	at Lafayette	Fisher Field; Easton, PA	W 38–0	8,000	
October 4	Albright	Muhlenberg Field; Allentown, PA	W 53–0		
October 11	at Swarthmore	Swarthmore, PA	W 67–7		
October 17	at Temple	Temple Stadium; Philadelphia, PA	L 6–7	27,000	
October 25	Upsala	Muhlenberg Field; Allentown, PA	W 40–0		
November 1	at Lehigh	Taylor Stadium; Bethlehem, PA	W 21–14	10,000	
November 8	Gettysburg	Muhlenberg Field; Allentown, PA	W 27–0		
November 15	vs. Delaware	Liberty High School Stadium; Bethlehem, PA	W 20–14	8,000	
November 22	Bucknell	Muhlenberg Field; Allentown, PA	W 39–0		
November 27	at Franklin & Marshall	Lancaster, PA	W 57–7	11,000	
