= 1949 Middle Tennessee Blue Raiders football team =

American college football season

1949 Middle Tennessee Blue Raiders football

VSAC champion
- Conference: Volunteer State Athletic Conference
- Record: 8–0–1 (2–0 VSAC)
- Head coach: Charles M. Murphy (3rd season)
- Captains: J. Adams; Fred Grider
- Home stadium: Horace Jones Field

1949 Volunteer State Athletic Conference football standings
	Conf.					Overall
Team	W		L		T	W		L		T
Middle Tennessee $	2	–	0	–	0	8	–	0	–	1
Austin Peay	1	–	0	–	0	8	–	2	–	0
Milligan	0	–	1	–	0	3	–	5	–	2
Union (TN)	0	–	2	–	0	1	–	8	–	1
$ – Conference champion

The 1949 Middle Tennessee Blue Raiders football team represented the Middle Tennessee State College—now known as Middle Tennessee State University—as a member of the Volunteer State Athletic Conference (VSAC) during the 1949 college football season. Led by third-year head coach Charles M. Murphy, the Blue Raiders compiled a record an overall record of 8–0–1 with a mark of 2–0 in conference play, winning the VSAC title. The team's captains were J. Adams and Fred Grider.

== Schedule ==
Date	Time	Opponent	Site	Result	Source
September 22		Millington Navy*	Horace Jones Field; Murfreesboro, TN	W 25–13	
September 30		Maryville*	Horace Jones Field; Murfreesboro, TN	W 45–13	
October 8		Union (TN)	Horace Jones Field; Murfreesboro, TN	W 32–18	
October 15		at Arkansas State*	Kays Stadium; Jonesboro, AR	W 25–12	
October 22		at Milligan	J. Fred Johnson Park; Kingsport, TN	W 19–0	
October 28		East Tennessee State*	Horace Jones Field; Murfreesboro, TN	W 30–0	
November 5	8:00 p.m.	at Florence State*	Coffee Stadium; Florence, AL	W 55–16	
November 12		at Murray State*	Cutchin Stadium; Murray, KY	T 7–7	
November 24		Tennessee Tech*	Horace Jones Field; Murfreesboro, TN	W 14–0	
*Non-conference game; All times are in Central time
