= 1950 Troy State Red Wave football team =

American college football season

1950 Troy State Red Wave football
- Conference: Alabama Intercollegiate Conference
- Record: 3–6–1 (1–1–1 AIC)
- Head coach: Fred McCollum (4th season)
- Home stadium: Veterans Memorial Stadium

The 1950 Troy State Red Wave football team represented Troy State Teachers College (now known as Troy University) as a member of the Alabama Intercollegiate Conference (AIC) during the 1950 college football season. Led by fourth-year head coach Fred McCollum, the Red Wave compiled an overall record of 3–6–1, with a mark of 1–1–1 in conference play.

== Schedule ==
Date	Time	Opponent	Site	Result	Attendance	Source
September 16		Southeastern Louisiana*	Veterans Memorial Stadium; Troy, AL	L 7–18		
September 23		at Stetson*	DeLand Municipal Stadium; DeLand, FL	L 12–24		
September 30		Florida State*	Veterans Memorial Stadium; Troy, AL	L 7–26		
October 7		at Southwestern Louisiana*	McNaspy Stadium; Lafayette, LA	L 14–40		
October 14		at Jacksonville State	College Bowl; Jacksonville, AL (rivalry)	L 0–9		
October 21		at Arkansas State*	Kays Stadium; Jonesboro, AR	L 0–27		
October 28	8:00 p.m.	at Florence State	Municipal Stadium; Florence, AL	W 19–0	6,000	
November 4		Chipola Junior College*^{†}	Veterans Memorial Stadium; Troy, AL	W 42–0		
November 11		vs. Howard (AL)*	Municipal Stadium; Andalusia, AL	W 21–6		
November 18		Livingston State	Veterans Memorial Stadium; Troy, AL	T 0–0		
*Non-conference game; ^{†}Homecoming; All times are in Central time
