= 1947 Memphis State Tigers football team =

American college football season

1947 Memphis State Tigers football
- Conference: Independent
- Record: 6–2–1
- Head coach: Ralph Hatley (1st season)
- Home stadium: Crump Stadium

1947 Southern non-major college football independents records
	Conf.			Overall
Team	W	L	T	W		L		T
Princess Anne		–		8	–	0	–	0
Grambling		–		10	–	2	–	0
Sewanee		–		6	–	1	–	1
Memphis State		–		6	–	2	–	1
Texas State		–		9	–	3	–	0
Mississippi Southern		–		7	–	3	–	0
Oklahoma City		–		7	–	3	–	0
East Tennessee State		–		5	–	4	–	0
Catholic University		–		3	–	3	–	0
Delaware		–		4	–	4	–	0
Tennessee Tech		–		4	–	7	–	0
CCUNC		–		1	–	3	–	0
Florida State		–		0	–	5	–	0

The 1947 Memphis State Tigers football team represented Memphis State College (now known as the University of Memphis) as an independent during the 1947 college football season. In its first season under head coach Ralph Hatley, the team compiled a 6–2–1 record and outscored opponents by a total of 238 to 60. Fred Medling was the team captain.

In the final Litkenhous Ratings released in mid-December, Memphis State was ranked at No. 167 out of 500 college football teams.

The team played its home games at Crump Stadium in Memphis, Tennessee.

== Schedule ==
Date	Opponent	Site	Result	Attendance	Source
September 25	at Middle Tennessee	Horace Jones Field; Murfreesboro, TN	L 0–20		
October 4	Missouri Mines	Crump Stadium; Memphis, TN	W 13–0		
October 11	Centenary	Crump Stadium; Memphis, TN	W 26–7	6,000	
October 17	at Murray State	Cutchin Stadium; Murray, KY	L 7–14	3,500	
October 23	at Union (TN)	Municipal Stadium; Jackson, TN	W 21–0	3,000	
November 1	at Pensacola NAS	Pensacola, FL	W 54–0		
November 7	at Memphis Navy	Millington H.S. Stadium; Millington, TN	W 58–0		
November 17	Arkansas State	Crump Stadium; Memphis, TN (rivalry)	T 19–19	3,440	
November 22	Austin Peay^{†}	Crump Stadium; Memphis, TN	W 40–0		
^{†}Homecoming
