= 1949 Mississippi College Choctaws football team =

American college football season

1949 Mississippi College Choctaws football
- Conference: Dixie Conference
- Record: 4–5 (2–2 Dixie)
- Head coach: Stanley L. Robinson (21st season)
- Home stadium: Robinson Field

1949 Dixie Conference football standings
	Conf.					Overall
Team	W		L		T	W		L		T
Florida State $	4	–	0	–	0	9	–	1	–	0
Howard (AL)	2	–	0	–	0	4	–	5	–	0
Stetson	2	–	2	–	0	4	–	5	–	1
Mississippi College	2	–	2	–	0	4	–	5	–	0
Tampa	0	–	2	–	0	0	–	8	–	0
Millsaps	0	–	4	–	0	2	–	5	–	0
$ – Conference champion

The 1949 Mississippi College Choctaws football team represented Mississippi College as a member of the Dixie Conference during the 1949 college football season. Led by 21st-year head coach Stanley L. Robinson, the Choctaws compiled an overall record of 4–5 with a mark of 2–2 in conference play, tying for third place in the Dixie Conference. Mississippi College played home games at Robinson Field in Clinton, Mississippi.

== Schedule ==
Date	Time	Opponent	Site	Result	Attendance	Source
September 24	8:00 p.m.	Arkansas State*	Robinson Field; Clinton, MS	W 19–7		
October 1	8:00 p.m.	vs. Louisiana College*	Vicksburg, MS	L 7–26		
October 8	8:00 p.m.	Florida State	Robinson Field; Clinton, MS	L 12–33		
October 15		at Sewanee*	Hardee Field; Sewanee, TN	L 0–21	2,000	
October 22	8:00 p.m.	Southwestern (TN)*	Robinson Field; Clinton, MS	W 19–13		
November 1	8:15 p.m.	at Millsaps	Tiger Stadium; Jackson, MS (rivalry)	W 42–6		
November 5	8:00 p.m.	Howard (AL)^{†}	Robinson Field; Clinton, MS	L 14–19		
November 12		at East Texas Baptist*	Maverick Stadium; Marshall, TX	L 7–14		
November 19		vs. Stetson	Municipal Memorial Stadium; Daytona Beach, FL	W 33–13	2,000	
*Non-conference game; ^{†}Homecoming; All times are in Central time
