= 1949 Tampa Spartans football team =

American college football season

1949 Tampa Spartans football
- Conference: Dixie Conference
- Record: 0–8 (0–2 Dixie)
- Head coach: Mike Gaddis (2nd season)
- Offensive scheme: T formation
- Home stadium: Phillips Field

1949 Dixie Conference football standings
	Conf.					Overall
Team	W		L		T	W		L		T
Florida State $	4	–	0	–	0	9	–	1	–	0
Howard (AL)	2	–	0	–	0	4	–	5	–	0
Stetson	2	–	2	–	0	4	–	5	–	1
Mississippi College	2	–	2	–	0	4	–	5	–	0
Tampa	0	–	2	–	0	0	–	8	–	0
Millsaps	0	–	4	–	0	2	–	5	–	0
$ – Conference champion

The 1949 Tampa Spartans football team represented the University of Tampa as a member of the Dixie Conference during the 1949 college football season. Led by Mike Gaddis in his second and final season as head coach, the Spartans compiled an overall record of 0–8 with a mark of 0–2 in conference play, placing fifth in the Dixie Conference. Tampa employed the T formation on offense. The team played home games at Phillips Field in Tampa, Florida.

== Schedule ==
Date	Time	Opponent	Site	Result	Attendance	Source
September 23	8:00 p.m.	Memphis State*	Phillips Field; Tampa, FL	L 6–70	6,000	
September 30	8:00 p.m.	Milligan*	Phillips Field; Tampa, FL	L 19–20		
October 7	8:00 p.m.	Rollins*	Phillips Field; Tampa, FL	L 13–26	4,000	
October 14	8:00 p.m.	Abilene Christian*	Phillips Field; Tampa, FL	L 12–38	2,000	
October 22	8:00 p.m.	at Stetson	Deland Municipal Stadium; Deland, FL	L 14–40	3,200	
October 28	8:00 p.m.	Erskine*	Phillips Field; Tampa, FL	L 0–14		
November 12		at Delta State*	Cleveland, MS	L 7–46		
November 18	8:00 p.m.	Florida State^{†}	Phillips Field; Tampa, FL	L 17–34	4,000	
*Non-conference game; ^{†}Homecoming; All times are in Eastern time
