= 1947 Middle Tennessee Blue Raiders football team =

American college football season

1947 Middle Tennessee Blue Raiders football

VSAC champion
- Conference: Volunteer State Athletic Conference
- Record: 9–1 (5–0 VSAC)
- Head coach: Charles M. Murphy (1st season)
- Captains: Henry Brandon; Leonard Staggs
- Home stadium: Horace Jones Field

1947 Volunteer State Athletic Conference football standings
	Conf.					Overall
Team	W		L		T	W		L		T
Middle Tennessee $	5	–	0	–	0	9	–	1	–	0
Tennessee Tech	1	–	1	–	0	4	–	7	–	0
Union (TN)	1	–	1	–	0	5	–	5	–	0
Cumberland (TN)	0	–	2	–	1	5	–	5	–	1
Austin Peay	0	–	2	–	1	3	–	6	–	1
Milligan	0	–	1	–	0	5	–	4	–	1
$ – Conference champion

The 1947 Middle Tennessee Blue Raiders football team represented the Middle Tennessee State College—now known as Middle Tennessee State University—as a member of the Volunteer State Athletic Conference (VSAC) during the 1947 college football season. Led by first-year head coach Charles M. Murphy, the Blue Raiders compiled a record an overall record of 9–1 with a mark of 5–0 in conference play, winning the VSAC title. The team's captains were Henry Brandon and Leonard Staggs.

In the final Litkenhous Ratings released in mid-December, Middle Tennessee was ranked at No. 188 out of 500 college football teams.

== Schedule ==
Date	Time	Opponent	Site	Result	Attendance	Source
September 19		at Southeast Missouri State*	Houck Stadium; Cape Girardeau, MO	W 12–0		
September 25		Memphis State*	Horace Jones Field; Murfreesboro, TN	W 20–0		
October 4		at Milligan	J. Fred Johnson Park; Kingsport, TN	W 7–0	2,000	
October 11		Union (TN)	Horace Jones Field; Murfreesboro, TN	W 19–6		
October 16		at Austin Peay	Clarksville Municipal Stadium; Clarksville, TN	W 33–0		
October 23		at Cumberland (TN)	Lebanon, TN	W 41–12		
November 6		Maryville (TN)*	Horace Jones Field; Murfreesboro, TN	L 6–13	3,000	
November 15		at Troy State*	Pace Field; Troy, AL (rivalry)	W 41–17		
November 20	7:45 p.m.	East Tennessee State*	Horace Jones Field; Murfreesboro, TN	W 26–13		
November 27		Tennessee Tech^{†}	Horace Jones Field; Murfreesboro, TN	W 19–0	5,000–7,000	
*Non-conference game; ^{†}Homecoming; All times are in Central time
