= 1947 Drexel Dragons football team =

American college football season

1947 Drexel Dragons football
- Conference: Independent
- Record: 0–8
- Head coach: Ralph Chase (2nd season)
- Home stadium: Drexel Field

1947 Eastern non-major college football independents records
	Conf.			Overall
Team	W	L	T	W		L		T
Muhlenberg		–		9	–	1	–	0
Buffalo		–		8	–	1	–	0
Hofstra		–		5	–	3	–	0
Tufts		–		5	–	3	–	0
Franklin & Marshall		–		4	–	3	–	1
Springfield		–		4	–	4	–	0
CCNY		–		2	–	5	–	1
Bucknell		–		2	–	7	–	0
Carnegie Tech		–		0	–	6	–	0
Drexel		–		0	–	8	–	0
Rankings from AP Poll

The 1947 Drexel Dragons football team represented the Drexel Institute of Technology (renamed Drexel University in 1970) as an independent during the 1947 college football season. Ralph Chase was the team's head coach.

== Schedule ==
Date	Time	Opponent	Site	Result	Attendance	Source
September 26	8:00 p.m.	at West Chester	Wayne Field; West Chester, PA	L 13–33	5,000	
October 4		Ursinus	Drexel Field; Philadelphia, PA	L 0–6		
October 11	2:00 p.m.	Lehigh	Drexel Field; Philadelphia, PA	L 0–7	5,000	
October 18	2:15 p.m.	at Haverford	Walton Field; Haverford, PA	L 6–33	4,500	
October 25		Pennsylvania Military	Drexel Field; Philadelphia, PA	L 0–25		
November 1		at Johns Hopkins		L 0–39	6,000	
November 8		at Dickinson		L 13–25		
November 15		Swarthmore^{†}	Drexel Field; Philadelphia, PA	L 14–19	2,000	
^{†}Homecoming; All times are in Eastern time

== Roster ==
1947 Drexel Dragons football team roster
Players			Coaches
Offense: Pos. / # / Name / Class	Defense: Pos. / # / Name / Class	Special teams: Pos. / # / Name / Class	Head coach: Ralph Chase (Pittsburgh); Coordinators/assistant coaches Legend: (C) Team captain; (S) Suspended; (I) Ineligible; Injured; Redshirt
