= 1949 Howard Bulldogs football team =

American college football season

1949 Howard Bulldogs football
- Conference: Dixie Conference
- Record: 4–5 (2–0 Dixie)
- Head coach: Earl Gartman (1st season)
- Offensive scheme: T formation
- Home stadium: Woodlawn High School Stadium, Tarrant High School Stadium, Berry Field

1949 Dixie Conference football standings
	Conf.					Overall
Team	W		L		T	W		L		T
Florida State $	4	–	0	–	0	9	–	1	–	0
Howard (AL)	2	–	0	–	0	4	–	5	–	0
Stetson	2	–	2	–	0	4	–	5	–	1
Mississippi College	2	–	2	–	0	4	–	5	–	0
Tampa	0	–	2	–	0	0	–	8	–	0
Millsaps	0	–	4	–	0	2	–	5	–	0
$ – Conference champion

The 1949 Howard Bulldogs football team represented Howard College—now known as the Samford University—as a member of the Dixie Conference during the 1949 college football season. Led by first-year head coach Earl Gartman, the Bulldogs compiled an overall record of 4–5 with a mark of 2–0 in conference play, placing second in the Dixie Conference. Howard employed the T formation on offense. The team played one home game at each of three difference stadiums, Woodlawn High School Stadium and Berry Field, both located in Birmingham, Alabama, and Tarrant High School Stadium in Tarrant, Alabama

== Schedule ==
Date	Time	Opponent	Site	Result	Attendance	Source
September 24	9:00 p.m.	at Wofford*	Spartanburg, SC	L 13–27	5,000	
October 1	2:30 p.m.	Tennessee Tech*	Woodlawn High School Stadium; Birmingham, AL	L 18–33	1,500	
October 8	7:30 p.m.	at Florence State*	Coffee Stadium; Florence, AL	L 7–18	5,500	
October 14	7:30 p.m.	Marion*	Tarrant High School Stadium; Tarrant, AL	W 24–13	3,000	
October 22		at Western Kentucky*	Bowling Green, KY	L 0–20	2,500	
November 5	8:00 p.m.	at Mississippi College	Robinson Field; Clinton, MS	W 19–14		
November 12	8:00 p.m.	at Troy State*	Pace Field; Troy, AL	L 0–27		
November 19	2:00 p.m.	Millsaps^{†}	Berry Field; Birmingham, AL	W 18–0	3,000	
November 25	7:30 p.m.	at Athens*	Athens High Stadium; Athens, AL	W 19–0		
*Non-conference game; ^{†}Homecoming; All times are in Central time
