= St. Bernard Preparatory School =

- Schola Praeparatoria Sancti Bernardi

Location
- 1600 St. Bernard Drive, SE; Cullman, Alabama 35055; United States; 34°10′29″N 86°48′55″W

Information
- Type: Private, Boarding & Day School
- Motto: Corpus Mens Spiritus (Body, Mind, Spirit)
- Religious affiliations: Roman Catholic (Benedictine)
- Patron saint: St. Bernard of Clairvaux
- Established: 1891 (135 years ago)
- CEEB code: 010806
- President: Rev. Joel W. Martin, O.S.B.
- Headmaster: Phuong Nguyen
- Chairman of the Board of Trustees: Rt. Rev. Marcus Voss, O.S.B.
- Chaplain: Fr. Linus Klucsarits, O.S.B.
- Faculty: 21
- Grades: 7–12
- Gender: Coeducational
- Colors: Navy blue and white
- Athletics conference: AHSAA
- Team name: Saints / Lady Saints
- Accreditation: Southern Association of Colleges and Schools
- Publication: St. Bernard Happenings (Alumni Publication)
- Newspaper: The Saintly News
- Yearbook: The Bernardian
- Affiliation: National Catholic Educational Association
- Website: www.stbernardprep.com

St. Bernard Preparatory School is a private Roman Catholic day school and boarding school in Cullman, Alabama. It is run independently of the Diocese of Birmingham in Alabama by the Benedictine monks of St. Bernard Abbey, located on the same campus.

== History ==
Colonel John G. Cullmann, a German immigrant, founded the town of Cullman in 1873. He promoted the town among other German immigrants. Benedictine Monks came to the city from Saint Vincent Archabbey in Latrobe, Pennsylvania, in the 1880s. A number of these monks had come from Bavaria, in order to serve this German-speaking Catholic community. They established St. Bernard Abbey on September 29, 1891, named after St. Bernard of Clairvaux.

In 1891, they also started St. Bernard College on the monastery grounds, educating boys from grades 6-12. The state chartered the school in 1893. While primarily a prep school, it sometimes granted bachelor's degrees.

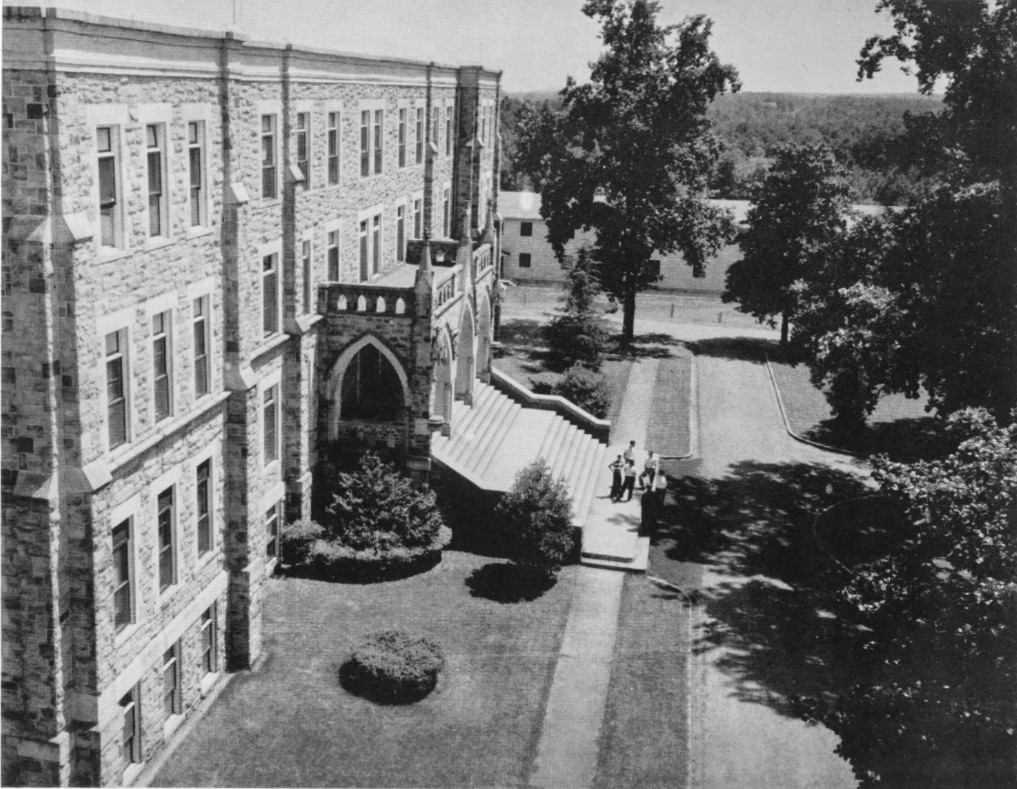
St. Bernard Preparatory School, 1959

In 1929 the Board of Trustees added a junior college. In 1949, this became a senior college. In time, the college discontinued the preparatory school and in 1976 merged with a local women's college to become Southern Benedictine College.

Over the years, the school and abbey has also educated candidates for ordination through its seminary programs from high school through graduate studies.

Southern Benedictine College was closed in 1979, however, the institution reopened in 1984 as a coeducational college preparatory school, serving grades 9-12 (these grades became the Upper School in 2007). The Upper School is primarily housed in the Cullman-Swisher School Building, which was refurbished in 2009. Grades 7 and 8, the Middle School, were added in 2007. The Middle School is located in Founders' Hall.

== Athletics ==
As a member of the Alabama High School Athletic Association, the school competes with public and private schools in football, cross country, basketball, volleyball, soccer, baseball, softball, and tennis.

Boys' sports:

- Baseball
- Wrestling

Girls' sports:

- Cheerleading
- Volleyball

Co-ed sports:

- Basketball
- Cross Country
- Soccer
- Tennis
- Bowling
