= 1947 Lehigh Engineers football team =

American college football season

1947 Lehigh Engineers football
- Conference: Middle Three Conference
- Record: 5–4 (0–2 Middle Three)
- Head coach: Bill Leckonby (2nd season)
- Home stadium: Taylor Stadium

1947 Middle Three Conference football standings
	Conf.					Overall
Team	W		L		T	W		L		T
Rutgers $	2	–	0	–	0	8	–	1	–	0
Lafayette	1	–	1	–	0	6	–	3	–	0
Lehigh	0	–	2	–	0	5	–	4	–	0
$ – Conference champion

The 1947 Lehigh Engineers football team was an American football team that represented Lehigh University during the 1947 college football season. In its second season under head coach Bill Leckonby, the team compiled a 5–4 record and was outscored by a total of 122 to 111. On October 4, 1947, the team achieved the 250th victory in the 63-year history of Lehigh football dating back to 1884. Lehigh played home games at Taylor Stadium in Bethlehem, Pennsylvania.

In the final Litkenhous Ratings released in mid-December, Lehigh was ranked at No. 207 out of 500 college football teams.

== Schedule ==
Date	Opponent	Site	Result	Attendance	Source
September 27	at Cornell*	Schoellkopf Field; Ithaca, NY	L 0–27	12,000	
October 4	Case Tech*	Taylor Stadium; Bethlehem, PA	W 21–6	> 6,500	
October 11	at Drexel*	Drexel Field; Philadelphia, PA	W 7–0	5,000	
October 18	at Gettysburg*	Gettysburg, PA	W 9–7		
October 25	at Rutgers	Rutgers Stadium; Piscataway, NJ	L 13–46	12,000	
November 1	Muhlenberg*	Taylor Stadium; Bethlehem, PA	L 14–21	10,000	
November 8	Merchant Marine*	Taylor Stadium; Bethlehem, PA	W 20–6	5,000	
November 15	at Carnegie Tech*	Forbes Field; Pittsburgh, PA	W 27–2	3,000	
November 22	Lafayette	Taylor Stadium; Bethlehem, PA (rivalry)	L 0–7	16,000	
*Non-conference game
