= 1947 Buffalo Bulls football team =

American college football season

1947 Buffalo Bulls football
- Conference: Independent
- Record: 8–1
- Head coach: Jim Peele (9th season)
- Captain: Lou Corriere
- Home stadium: Civic Stadium

1947 Eastern non-major college football independents records
	Conf.			Overall
Team	W	L	T	W		L		T
Muhlenberg		–		9	–	1	–	0
Buffalo		–		8	–	1	–	0
Hofstra		–		5	–	3	–	0
Tufts		–		5	–	3	–	0
Franklin & Marshall		–		4	–	3	–	1
Springfield		–		4	–	4	–	0
CCNY		–		2	–	5	–	1
Bucknell		–		2	–	7	–	0
Carnegie Tech		–		0	–	6	–	0
Drexel		–		0	–	8	–	0
Rankings from AP Poll

The 1947 Buffalo Bulls football team was an American football team that represented the University of Buffalo as an independent during the 1947 college football season. In its ninth and final season under head coach Jim Peele, the team compiled an 8–1 record.

The team was led by Bill Rudick. Coach Peelle rated Rudick as his best all-around player. Rudick played on offense where he was known as an excellent blocking back and for his "hard-hitting style" of carrying the ball and on defense for his "jarring tackles".

In the final Litkenhous Ratings released in mid-December, Buffalo was ranked at No. 127 out of 500 college football teams.

== Schedule ==
Date	Opponent	Site	Result	Attendance	Source
September 19	Niagara	Buffalo, NY	W 27–14		
September 26	at Moravian	Bethlehem, PA	W 7–0	5,000	
October 4	RPI	Troy, NY	W 14–7		
October 11	Hobart	Civic Stadium; Buffalo, NY	W 54–0	5,238	
October 18	at Alfred	Merrill Field; Alfred, NY	W 40–7	6,000	
October 25	at Wayne	Detroit, MI	L 12–33	6,200	
November 1	Bethany (WV)	Buffalo, NY	W 50–6		
November 8	St. Lawrence	Civic Stadium; Buffalo, NY	W 40–7		
November 15	at Bucknell	Memorial Stadium; Lewisburg, PA	W 14–0		
