= Paper Bowl =

Paper Bowl (defunct)
- Stadium: Pensacola H.S. Stadium
- Location: Pensacola, Florida
- Operated: 1948–1950

The Paper Bowl was an independently run college football bowl game played at Pensacola High School's Stadium in Pensacola, Florida. Like many bowl games during its time, it was not officially organized by the National Collegiate Athletic Association, but its results are included in NCAA records. According to the Pensacola News Journal, proceeds from ticket sales went to the Pensacola High School band, which played at halftime shows with both college bands.

== Game results ==
Date	Winning Team		Losing Team		Reference
1948	Jacksonville State	19	Troy State	0	
1949	Jacksonville State	12	Livingston State	7	
1950	Pensacola Naval Alumni	7	Jacksonville State	6	
