= J. C. Coffee (American football) =

American football player and coach (1915–2000)

Biographical details
- Born: April 22, 1915; Henderson County, Kentucky, U.S.
- Died: September 14, 2009 (aged 94)

Playing career

Football
- 1943: Indiana
- Position: Guard

Coaching career (HC unless noted)

Football
- 1946–1947: Maryland State
- 1948–1950: Maryland State (line)

Track
- 1949: Maryland State

Head coaching record
- Overall: 13–3–1

Accomplishments and honors

Awards
- Second-team All-Big Ten (1943)

J. C. Chestine "Rooster" Coffee (April 22, 1915 – September 14, 2000) was an American football coach and player. He served as the head football coach at Maryland State College (now known as the University of Maryland Eastern Shore) from 1946 to 1947. He led the 1947 Maryland State Raiders football team to a perfect 8–0 record. He played college football at Indiana University, earning All-Big Nine honors as a guard in 1943.
