= 1949 Arkansas State Indians football team =

American college football season

1949 Arkansas State Indians football
- Conference: Arkansas Intercollegiate Conference
- Record: 5–4 ( AIC)
- Head coach: Forrest England (4th season)
- Home stadium: Kays Stadium

The 1949 Arkansas State Indians football team represented Arkansas State College—now known as Arkansas State University—as a member of the Arkansas Intercollegiate Conference (AIC) during the 1949 college football season. Led by fourth-year head coach Forrest England, the Indians compiled an overall record of 5–4.

== Schedule ==
Date	Time	Opponent	Site	Result	Attendance	Source
September 24	8:00 p.m.	at Mississippi College	Robinson Field; Clinton, MS	L 7–19		
October 1		Memphis NAS	Kays Stadium; Jonesboro, AR	L 14–20		
October 8		Ouachita Baptist	Kays Stadium; Jonesboro, AR	W 14–0		
October 15		Middle Tennessee	Kays Stadium; Jonesboro, AR	L 12–25		
October 22		at Delta State	Delta Field; Cleveland, MS	W 7–6		
November 5		at Henderson State	Arkadelphia, AR	W 28–6		
November 12		Memphis State	Kays Stadium; Jonesboro, AR (rivalry)	L 7–61		
November 18		Missouri Valley	Kays Stadium; Jonesboro, AR	W 7–6	2,000	
November 24		Union (TN)	Kays Stadium; Jonesboro, AR	W 12–7		
All times are in Central time
