= 1949 Stetson Hatters football team =

American college football season

1949 Stetson Hatters football
- Conference: Dixie Conference
- Record: 4–5–1 (2–2 Dixie)
- Head coach: Bob Trocolor (1st season)
- Home stadium: DeLand Municipal Stadium

1949 Dixie Conference football standings
| | Conf. | | | | | Overall |
| Team | W | | L | | T | W | | L | | T |
|---|---|---|---|---|---|---|---|---|---|---|
| Florida State $ | 4 | – | 0 | – | 0 | 9 | – | 1 | – | 0 |
| Howard (AL) | 2 | – | 0 | – | 0 | 4 | – | 5 | – | 0 |
| Stetson | 2 | – | 2 | – | 0 | 4 | – | 5 | – | 1 |
| Mississippi College | 2 | – | 2 | – | 0 | 4 | – | 5 | – | 0 |
| Tampa | 0 | – | 2 | – | 0 | 0 | – | 8 | – | 0 |
| Millsaps | 0 | – | 4 | – | 0 | 2 | – | 5 | – | 0 |
$ – Conference champion

The 1949 Stetson Hatters football team represented Stetson University as a member of the Dixie Conference during the 1949 college football season. Led by Bob Trocolor in his first and only year as head coach, the Hatters compiled an overall record of 4–5–1 with a mark of 2–2 in conference play, tying for third place in the Dixie Conference. Stetson played home games at DeLand Municipal Stadium in DeLand, Florida.

== Schedule ==
| Date | Time | Opponent | Site | Result | Attendance | Source |
|---|---|---|---|---|---|---|
| September 24 | | Saufley Field* | DeLand Municipal Stadium; DeLand, FL | W 60–0 | 3,000 | |
| October 1 | 8:00 p.m. | at Millsaps | Tiger Stadium; Jackson, MS | W 16–6 | | |
| October 8 | 8:00 p.m. | Troy State* | DeLand Municipal Stadium; DeLand, FL | L 0–10 | 3,200 | |
| October 15 | 8:00 p.m. | at Milligan* | Memorial Stadium; Johnson City, TN | T 13–13 | 3,000 | |
| October 22 | 8:00 p.m. | Tampa | Deland Municipal Stadium; Deland, FL | W 40–14 | 3,200 | |
| October 29 | 2:30 p.m. | vs. Florida State | Gator Bowl Stadium; Jacksonville, FL | L 14–33 | 7,500 | |
| November 5 | 8:00 p.m. | at Erskine* | Fair Grounds football stadium; Greenwood, SC | W 24–13 | 2,000 | |
| November 12 | | Presbyterian*^{†} | DeLand Municipal Stadium; DeLand, FL | L 12–14 | 4,500 | |
| November 19 | | vs. Mississippi College | Municipal Memorial Stadium; Daytona Beach, FL | L 13–33 | 2,000 | |
| December 2 | | at Rollins* | Tangerine Bowl; Orlando, FL | L 14–19 | | |
*Non-conference game; ^{†}Homecoming; All times are in Eastern time
