= 1947 Oklahoma City Chiefs football team =

American college football season

1947 Oklahoma City Chiefs football
- Conference: Independent
- Record: 7–3
- Head coach: Bo Rowland (2nd season)
- Home stadium: Taft Stadium

1947 Southern non-major college football independents records
	Conf.			Overall
Team	W	L	T	W		L		T
Princess Anne		–		8	–	0	–	0
Grambling		–		10	–	2	–	0
Sewanee		–		6	–	1	–	1
Memphis State		–		6	–	2	–	1
Texas State		–		9	–	3	–	0
Mississippi Southern		–		7	–	3	–	0
Oklahoma City		–		7	–	3	–	0
East Tennessee State		–		5	–	4	–	0
Catholic University		–		3	–	3	–	0
Delaware		–		4	–	4	–	0
Tennessee Tech		–		4	–	7	–	0
CCUNC		–		1	–	3	–	0
Florida State		–		0	–	5	–	0

The 1947 Oklahoma City Chiefs football team represented Oklahoma City University as an independent during the 1947 college football season. Led by Bo Rowland in his second and final season as head coach, the team compiled a record of 7–3.

Oklahoma City was ranked at No. 83 (out of 500 college football teams) in the final Litkenhous Ratings for 1947.

== Schedule ==
Date	Opponent	Site	Result	Attendance	Source
September 12	North Dakota	Taft Stadium; Oklahoma City, OK	W 20–7		
September 20	at Fresno State	Ratcliffe Stadium; Fresno, CA	W 27–2	13,758	
October 4	Hardin	Taft Stadium; Oklahoma City, OK	L 11–19	8,500	
October 11	at Colorado College	Washburn Field; Colorado Springs, CO	W 69–0		
October 18	at Cincinnati	Nippert Stadium; Cincinnati, OH	L 13–20	18,000	
October 25	Mississippi Southern	Taft Stadium; Oklahoma City, OK	W 21–6	4,800	
November 1	at Youngstown	Rayen Stadium; Youngstown, OH	L 13–19	14,000	
November 15	Louisiana Tech	Taft Stadium; Oklahoma City, OK	W 28–13	4,000	
November 22	Baldwin–Wallace	Taft Stadium; Oklahoma City, OK	W 49–25	1,000	
November 27	Western Michigan	Taft Stadium; Oklahoma City, OK	W 35–7	6,000	
