= Fred McCollum =

American football player and coach (1912–1978)

Biographical details
- Born: March 12, 1912; Birmingham, Alabama, U.S.
- Died: April 11, 1978 (aged 66); Chatham County, Georgia, U.S.

Playing career
- 1931–1933: Auburn
- Position: Tackle

Coaching career (HC unless noted)
- 1934–1941: Auburn (assistant)
- 1946: Livingston State
- 1947–1950: Troy State

Administrative career (AD unless noted)
- 1946–1947: Livingston State
- 1947–1950: Troy State

Head coaching record
- Overall: 24–20–3
- Bowls: 0–1

Accomplishments and honors

Championships
- 1 AIC (1991)

Frederick Gwaltney "Buddy" McCollum Sr. (March 12, 1912 – April 11, 1978) was an American college football player and coach and athletics administrator. He was the head football coach at the Livingston State Teachers College (now the University of West Alabama) in 1946 and at the Troy State Teachers College (now Troy University) from 1947 to 1950.

McCollum was a member of the Auburn Tigers football team from 1931 to 1933, where he played the tackle position. Following his graduation, he served as an assistant coach for the Tigers in the 1941 season. In December 1941, McCollum was called into active duty with the United States Army to serve in World War II.

On his return, he was the head football coach at Livingston State for the 1946 season and compiled an overall record of four wins and two losses during his tenure. In the following season, McCollum took the head coaching position at Troy State. From 1947 to 1950, he compiled an overall record of 20–18–3 with the Red Wave.

== Head coaching record ==
Year	Team	Overall	Conference	Standing	Bowl/playoffs
Livingston State Tigers (Alabama Intercollegiate Conference) (1946)
1946	Livingston State	4–2			
Livingston State:		4–2			
Troy State Red Wave (Alabama Intercollegiate Conference) (1947–1950)
1947	Troy State	5–4–1	2–1–1		
1948	Troy State	6–5	3–1		L Paper Bowl
1949	Troy State	6–3–1	2–0–1	T–1st	
1950	Troy State	3–6–1	1–1–1		
Troy State:		20–18–3	8–3–3		
Total:		24–20–3			
National championship Conference title Conference division title or championship game berth
