= Jim Peele =

Biographical details
- Born: June 12, 1907; Illinois, U.S.
- Died: October 17, 1976 (aged 69); Buffalo, New York, U.S.

Playing career

Football
- 1931–1933: Purdue
- Position: Quarterback

Coaching career (HC unless noted)

Football
- 1934–1935: Buffalo (assistant)
- 1936–1947: Buffalo

Baseball
- 1949: Buffalo
- 1952–1967: Buffalo

Administrative career (AD unless noted)
- 1936–1969: Buffalo

Head coaching record
- Overall: 38–34–1 (football); 177–66 (baseball)

James E. Peele (June 12, 1907 – October 17, 1976) was an American football player, coach of football and baseball, and college athletics administrator. He served as the head football coach at the University at Buffalo from 1936 to 1947, compiling a record of 38–34–1. Peele was also the head baseball coach at Buffalo in 1949 and from 1952 to 1967, tallying a mark of 177–66. A native of Staunton, Illinois, Peele played college football as a quarterback at Purdue University. He came to Buffalo 1934 as an assistant football coach under George Van Bibber and succeeded him as head football coach and athletic director in 1936. Peele remained athletic director until 1969. He died on October 17, 1976, in Buffalo, New York.

== Head coaching record ==
Year	Team	Overall	Conference	Standing	Bowl/playoffs
Buffalo Bulls (Independent) (1936–1947)
1936	Buffalo	5–3			
1937	Buffalo	4–4			
1938	Buffalo	2–6			
1939	Buffalo	0–7			
1940	Buffalo	3–5			
1941	Buffalo	3–4–1			
1942	Buffalo	6–2			
1943	No team—World War II				
1944	No team—World War II				
1945	No team—World War II				
1946	Buffalo	6–2			
1947	Buffalo	8–1			
Buffalo:		38–34–1			
Total:		38–34–1			
