= 1947 Springfield Gymnasts football team =

American college football season

1947 Springfield Gymnasts football
- Conference: Independent
- Record: 4–4
- Head coach: Ossie Solem (2nd season)
- Captains: Fred Booth; Fern Tetreau
- Home stadium: Pratt Field

1947 Eastern non-major college football independents records
	Conf.			Overall
Team	W	L	T	W		L		T
Muhlenberg		–		9	–	1	–	0
Buffalo		–		8	–	1	–	0
Hofstra		–		5	–	3	–	0
Tufts		–		5	–	3	–	0
Franklin & Marshall		–		4	–	3	–	1
Springfield		–		4	–	4	–	0
CCNY		–		2	–	5	–	1
Bucknell		–		2	–	7	–	0
Northeastern		–		1	–	5	–	0
Carnegie Tech		–		0	–	6	–	0
Drexel		–		0	–	8	–	0

The 1947 Springfield Gymnasts football team, sometimes also referred to as the Maroons, was an American football team that represented the Springfield College in Springfield, Massachusetts, during the 1947 college football season.

In the final Litkenhous Ratings released in mid-December, Springfield was ranked at No. 189 out of 500 college football teams.

In its second season under head coach Ossie Solem, the team compiled a 4–4 record and played its home games at Pratt Field in Springfield.

Solem had previously coached for three major football programs, Drake (1921–1931), Iowa (1932–1936), and Syracuse (1937–1945). During Solem's tenure as head coach, the program scheduled games against regional powers like Yale and Connecticut and intersectional games against opponents like Wayne.

== Schedule ==
Date	Opponent	Site	Result	Attendance	Source
September 27	Northeastern	Pratt Field; Springfield, MA	W 41–6	2,000	
October 4	Connecticut	Pratt Field; Springfield, MA	L 6–14	4,000	
October 11	at Norwich	Northfield, VT	W 42–0	1,500	
October 18	New Hampshire	Pratt Field; Springfield, MA	L 17–21		
October 25	at Yale	Yale Bowl; New Haven, CT	L 0–49	15,000	
November 1	Wayne	Pratt Field; Springfield, MA	L 10–14		
November 8	Massachusetts	Pratt Field; Springfield, MA	W 14–7		
November 15	at Cortland	Cortland, NY	W 22–7		
