= 1947 Bucknell Bison football team =

American college football season

1947 Bucknell Bison football
- Conference: Independent
- Record: 2–7
- Head coach: Harry Lawrence (1st season)
- Captains: Don Davidson; Edward J. Stec
- Home stadium: Memorial Stadium

1947 Eastern non-major college football independents records
	Conf.			Overall
Team	W	L	T	W		L		T
Muhlenberg		–		9	–	1	–	0
Buffalo		–		8	–	1	–	0
Hofstra		–		5	–	3	–	0
Tufts		–		5	–	3	–	0
Franklin & Marshall		–		4	–	3	–	1
Springfield		–		4	–	4	–	0
CCNY		–		2	–	5	–	1
Bucknell		–		2	–	7	–	0
Carnegie Tech		–		0	–	6	–	0
Drexel		–		0	–	8	–	0
Rankings from AP Poll

The 1947 Bucknell Bison football team was an American football team that represented Bucknell University as an independent during the 1947 college football season. In its first season under head coach Harry Lawrence, the team compiled a 2–7 record. Edward J. Stec and Don Davidson were the team captains.

In the final Litkenhous Ratings released in mid-December, Bucknell was ranked at No. 217 out of 500 college football teams.

The team played its home games at Memorial Stadium on the university campus in Lewisburg, Pennsylvania.

== Schedule ==
Date	Opponent	Site	Result	Attendance	Source
September 27	Alfred	Memorial Stadium; Lewisburg, PA	W 25–0	5,000	
October 4	at Penn State	New Beaver Field; State College, PA	L 0–54	14,000	
October 11	Delaware	Memorial Stadium; Lewisburg, PA	W 13–12		
October 18	at Lafayette	Fisher Field; Easton, PA	L 7–27	9,000	
October 25	Temple^{†}	Memorial Stadium; Lewisburg, PA	L 0–21	10,000	
November 1	at Gettysburg	Musselman Stadium; Gettysburg, PA	L 0–7	4,000	
November 11	at NYU	Yankee Stadium; Bronx, NY	L 6–19	5,000	
November 15	Buffalo	Memorial Stadium; Lewisburg, PA	L 6–14		
November 22	at Muhlenberg	Scotty Wood Stadium; Allentown, PA	L 0–39		
^{†}Homecoming
