= 1947 CCUNC Owls football team =

American college football season

1947 CCUNC Owls football
- Conference: Independent
- Record: 1–3
- Head coach: Marion Woods (1st season)
- Home stadium: American Legion Memorial Stadium

1947 Southern non-major college football independents records
	Conf.			Overall
Team	W	L	T	W		L		T
Princess Anne		–		8	–	0	–	0
Grambling		–		10	–	2	–	0
Sewanee		–		6	–	1	–	1
Memphis State		–		6	–	2	–	1
Texas State		–		9	–	3	–	0
Mississippi Southern		–		7	–	3	–	0
Oklahoma City		–		7	–	3	–	0
East Tennessee State		–		5	–	4	–	0
Catholic University		–		3	–	3	–	0
Delaware		–		4	–	4	–	0
Tennessee Tech		–		4	–	7	–	0
CCUNC		–		1	–	3	–	0
Florida State		–		0	–	5	–	0

The 1947 CCUNC Owls football team was an American football team that represented the Charlotte Center of the University of North Carolina or CCUNC (now known as the University of North Carolina at Charlotte) as an independent during the 1947 college football season. In their first season under head coach Marion Woods, the team compiled a 1–3 record.

== Schedule ==
Date	Opponent	Site	Result	Source
October 12	at Presbyterian JV	Old Bailey Stadium; Clinton, SC	L 19–33	
October 23	at Catawba JV	Shuford Stadium; Salisbury, NC	Cancelled	
November 1	Davidson JV	American Legion Memorial Stadium; Charlotte, NC	L 6–7	
November 8	at Hamlet All-Stars	Hamlet, NC	W 8–6	
November 12	Appalachian State JV	American Legion Memorial Stadium; Charlotte, NC	L 12–20	
