= Don Veller =

American football player and coach (1912–2006)

Biographical details
- Born: May 20, 1912; Linton, Indiana, U.S.
- Died: November 10, 2006 (aged 94); Tallahassee, Florida, U.S.

Playing career

Football
- 1932–1934: Indiana
- Position: Halfback

Coaching career (HC unless noted)

Football
- 1935–1941: Elkhart HS (IN)
- 1946: Hanover
- 1947: Indiana (assistant)
- 1948–1952: Florida State

Golf
- 1953–1958: Florida State
- 1966–1967: Florida State
- 1974–1983: Florida State

Head coaching record
- Overall: 35–15–1 (college football); 53–11–4 (high school football)

Accomplishments and honors

Championships
- Football; 3 Dixie (1948–1950)

Donald Arld Veller (May 20, 1912 – November 10, 2006) was an American football player and coach of football and golf. He served as the head football coach at Hanover College in 1946 and at Florida State University from 1948 to 1952, compiling a career college football record of 35–15–1. Veller died at the age of 94 on November 10, 2006, in Tallahassee, Florida.

== Head coaching record ==
=== College football ===
Year	Team	Overall	Conference	Standing	Bowl/playoffs
Hanover Panthers (Indiana Intercollegiate Conference) (1946)
1946	Hanover	4–3	3–2	6th	
Hanover:		4–3	3–2		
Florida State Seminoles (Dixie Conference) (1948–1950)
1948	Florida State	7–1	4–0	1st	
1949	Florida State	9–1	4–0	1st	
1950	Florida State	8–0	4–0	1st	
Florida State Seminoles (Independent) (1951–1952)
1951	Florida State	6–2			
1952	Florida State	1–8–1			
Florida State:		31–12–1	12–0		
Total:		35–15–1			
National championship Conference title Conference division title or championship game berth
