= Eric Shaw (American football) =

American football player (born 1971)

No. 90
- Position: Linebacker

Personal information
- Born: September 17, 1971 (age 55); Pensacola, Florida, U.S.
- Listed height: 6 ft 3 in (1.91 m)
- Listed weight: 248 lb (112 kg)

Career information
- High school: Pensacola
- College: Florida State (1989); Louisiana Tech (1990–1991)
- NFL draft: 1992: 12th round, 310th overall pick

Career history
- Cincinnati Bengals (1992–1994); Kansas City Chiefs (1995)*; Shreveport Knights (1999)
- * Offseason or practice squad member only

Career NFL statistics
- Tackles: 65
- Fumble recoveries: 1
- Stats at Pro Football Reference

Eric Wendell Shaw (born September 17, 1971) is an American former professional football player who was a linebacker for three seasons with the Cincinnati Bengals of the National Football League (NFL). He first played college football for the Florida State Seminoles before transferring to the Louisiana Tech Bulldogs. He was selected by the Bengals in the 12th round of the 1992 NFL draft. With the Bengals from 1992 through 1994, Shaw appeared in 28 games (10 starts).

== Early life ==
Eric Wendell Shaw was born on September 17, 1971, in Pensacola, Florida. He played high school football at Pensacola High School as a defensive end/outside linebacker. He was named first-team 4A all-state his junior year in 1987. He recorded 113 tackles and 24 quarterback sacks his senior year in 1988, garnering first-team 4A all-state recognition for the second consecutive season. Shaw was also named a Parade, USA Today and Super Prep All-American in high school.

== College career ==
Shaw committed to play college football at Florida State University for the Seminoles but was ineligible to play during his freshman year in 1989 due to low SAT scores. He transferred to Louisiana Tech University to play for the Bulldogs from 1990 to 1991.

== Professional career ==
Shaw was selected by the Cincinnati Bengals in the 12th round, with the 310th overall pick, of the 1992 NFL draft. He officially signed with the team on July 20. He was waived on August 31 and signed to the Bengals' practice squad the next day. He was promoted to the active roster on October 13 and played in 11 games, starting one, for the Bengals during the 1992 season. Shaw appeared in 14 games, starting nine, the next season in 1993, recording 49 tackles and one fumble recovery. He played in the first three games of the 1994 season, totaling one solo tackle and one assisted tackle. On September 18, 1994, Shaw was stopped by police for drunk driving and speeding. He was then suspended and fined over $10,000 by the Bengals, who then released him on September 22, 1994.

Shaw signed with the Kansas City Chiefs on February 28, 1995, and was released on July 19, 1995.

A comeback attempt in 1999 with the Shreveport Knights of the short-lived Regional Football League ended after one game due to a neck injury.

== Coaching career ==
Shaw became an assistant football coach at Lafayette High School in Lexington, Kentucky after his NFL career. He was promoted to head coach in 2013 and served in that role through the 2021 season, accumulating a 45–59 record. He resigned after the 2021 season.
