= Ed Williamson (American football) =

American football player and coach (1912–1991)

Biographical details
- Born: February 16, 1912; Atlanta, Georgia, U.S.
- Died: January 13, 1991 (aged 78); Tallahassee, Florida, U.S.

Playing career
- 1932: Florida

Coaching career (HC unless noted)
- 1947: Florida State

Head coaching record
- Overall: 0–5

Henry Edward Williamson (February 16, 1912 – January 13, 1991) was an American football coach and educator. He was the first head football coach for Florida State University, serving for one season, in 1947. Williamson was also an assistant professor of physical education at Florida State.

Williamson was born in Atlanta, Georgia and moved to Tallahassee, Florida at the age of one. He attended Leon High School in Tallahassee and then the University of Florida, where he played college football as an end. He coached high school football in North Florida before serving in the United States Navy as a gunnery officer during World War II.

Williamson died of cancer in 1991.

== Head coaching record ==
Year	Team	Overall	Conference	Standing	Bowl/playoffs
Florida State Seminoles (Independent) (1947)
1947	Florida State	0–5			
Florida State:		0–5			
Total:		0–5			
