= 1949 Florida State Seminoles football team =

American college football season

1949 Florida State Seminoles football

Dixie Conference champion Cigar Bowl champion

Cigar Bowl, W 19–6 vs. Wofford
- Conference: Dixie Conference
- Record: 9–1 (4–0 Dixie)
- Head coach: Don Veller (2nd season)
- Captain: Hugh Adams
- Home stadium: Centennial Field

1949 Dixie Conference football standings
	Conf.					Overall
Team	W		L		T	W		L		T
Florida State $	4	–	0	–	0	9	–	1	–	0
Howard (AL)	2	–	0	–	0	4	–	5	–	0
Stetson	2	–	2	–	0	4	–	5	–	1
Mississippi College	2	–	2	–	0	4	–	5	–	0
Tampa	0	–	2	–	0	0	–	8	–	0
Millsaps	0	–	4	–	0	2	–	5	–	0
$ – Conference champion

The 1949 Florida State Seminoles football team represented Florida State University as a member of the Dixie Conference during the 1949 college football season. Led by second-year head coach Don Veller, the Seminoles compiled an overall record of 9–1 with a mark of 4–0 in conference play, winning the Dixie Conference title for the second consecutive season. The Seminoles were invited to the program's first bowl game, the Cigar Bowl, where they defeated Wofford on January 2, 1950.

== Schedule ==
Date	Time	Opponent	Site	Result	Attendance	Source
October 1		Whiting Field NAS*	Centennial Field; Tallahassee, FL	W 74–0		
October 8	9:00 p.m.	at Mississippi College	Robinson Field; Clinton, MS	W 33–12		
October 15		Erskine*	Centennial Field; Tallahassee, FL	W 26–7		
October 22		at Sewanee*	Harris Stadium; Sewanee, TN	W 6–0		
October 29	2:30 p.m.	vs. Stetson	Gator Bowl Stadium; Jacksonville, FL	W 33–14	7,500	
November 5	9:00 p.m.	vs. Livingston State*	Memorial Stadium; Selma, AL	L 6–13	1,000	
November 12	2:00 p.m.	Millsaps^{†}	Centennial Field; Tallahassee, FL	W 40–0	7,500	
November 18	8:00 p.m.	at Tampa	Phillips Field; Tampa, FL	W 34–7	4,000	
November 26		Troy State*	Centennial Field; Tallahassee, FL	W 20–0		
January 2, 1950		vs. Wofford*	Phillips Field; Tampa, FL (Cigar Bowl)	W 19–6	14,000	
*Non-conference game; ^{†}Homecoming; All times are in Eastern time
