= 1948 Florida State Seminoles football team =

American college football season

1948 Florida State Seminoles football

Dixie Conference champion
- Conference: Dixie Conference
- Record: 7–1 (4–0 Dixie)
- Head coach: Don Veller (1st season)
- Captain: Game captains
- Home stadium: Centennial Field

1948 Dixie Conference football standings
| | Conf. | | | | | Overall |
| Team | W | | L | | T | W | | L | | T |
|---|---|---|---|---|---|---|---|---|---|---|
| Florida State $ | 4 | – | 0 | – | 0 | 7 | – | 1 | – | 0 |
| Mississippi College | 2 | – | 1 | – | 0 | 4 | – | 5 | – | 0 |
| Tampa | 1 | – | 1 | – | 0 | 2 | – | 6 | – | 0 |
| Stetson | 1 | – | 3 | – | 0 | 2 | – | 7 | – | 0 |
| Millsaps | 0 | – | 3 | – | 0 | 2 | – | 3 | – | 1 |
$ – Conference champion

The 1948 Florida State Seminoles football team represented Florida State University as a member of the Dixie Conference during the 1948 college football season. Led by first-year head coach Don Veller, the Seminoles compiled an overall record of 7–1 with a mark of 4–0 in conference play, winning the Dixie Conference title.

Florida State was ranked at No. 242 in the final Litkenhous Difference by Score System ratings for 1948.

== Schedule ==
| Date | Opponent | Site | Result | Attendance | Source |
|---|---|---|---|---|---|
| October 9 | Cumberland (TN)* | Centennial Field; Tallahassee, FL | W 30–0 | | |
| October 16 | at Erskine* | McCants Stadium; Anderson, SC | L 6–14 | 4,000 | |
| October 23 | at Millsaps | Tiger Stadium; Jackson, MS | W 7–6 | 5,000 | |
| October 30 | at Stetson | DeLand Municipal Stadium; DeLand, FL | W 18–7 | 4,500 | |
| November 13 | Mississippi College | Centennial Field; Tallahassee, FL | W 26–6 | | |
| November 20 | Livingston State* | Centennial Field; Tallahassee, FL | W 12–6 | | |
| November 27 | at Troy State* | Wiregrass Stadium; Dothan, AL | W 20–13 | | |
| December 4 | Tampa | Centennial Field; Tallahassee, FL | W 33–12 | 7,000 | |
*Non-conference game
