= 1947 Florida State Seminoles football team =

American college football season

1947 Florida State Seminoles football
- Conference: Independent
- Record: 0–5
- Head coach: Ed Williamson (1st season)
- Captains: Jack McMillan; Phil Rountree
- Home stadium: Centennial Field

1947 Southern non-major college football independents records
	Conf.			Overall
Team	W	L	T	W		L		T
Princess Anne		–		8	–	0	–	0
Grambling		–		10	–	2	–	0
Sewanee		–		6	–	1	–	1
Memphis State		–		6	–	2	–	1
Texas State		–		9	–	3	–	0
Mississippi Southern		–		7	–	3	–	0
Oklahoma City		–		7	–	3	–	0
East Tennessee State		–		5	–	4	–	0
Catholic University		–		3	–	3	–	0
Delaware		–		4	–	4	–	0
Tennessee Tech		–		4	–	7	–	0
CCUNC		–		1	–	3	–	0
Florida State		–		0	–	5	–	0

The 1947 Florida State Seminoles football team was an American football team that represented Florida State University as an independent during the 1947 college football season. In its first and only season under head coach Ed Williamson, the team compiled a 0–5 record and was outscored by a total of 90 to 18. The team played its home games at Centennial Field in Tallahassee, Florida.

In September 1947, the Florida State College for Women became coeducational, was renamed Florida State University and announced that it would field a football team, though it had no plans to compete with the University of Florida "for some time to come." The 1947 team was Florida State's first football team since 1904, after which Florida State became a women's college. Ed Williamson served as both athletic director and football coach and vowed to develop "a 'well rounded athletic program' without particular emphasis on football or any other single sport."

In five games during the 1947 season, the team gained only 687 yards from scrimmage. The team completed 32 of 87 passes for 400 yards and 14 interceptions. "Red" Parrish was the team's leading rusher with 111 yards. Fullback Kenneth McLean led the team with 150 yards of total offense (105 rushing yards, 45 passing yards).

== Schedule ==
Date	Opponent	Site	Result	Attendance	Source
October 18	Stetson	Centennial Field; Tallahassee, FL	L 6–14	8,000	
November 15	at Cumberland (TN)	Lebanon, TN	L 0–6		
November 22	Tennessee Tech	Centennial Field; Tallahassee, FL	L 6–27	5,436	
November 27	Troy State	Centennial Field; Tallahassee, FL	L 6–36	3,000	
December 6	Jacksonville State	Centennial Field; Tallahassee, FL	L 0–7	3,700	
