= Marion Woods =

American football player and coach

Playing career
- 1941: Clemson
- 1945: Clemson
- Position: Guard

Coaching career (HC unless noted)
- 1947: CCUNC

Head coaching record
- Overall: 1–3

Marion "Footsie" Woods was an American college football player and coach. He served as the head football coach at the Charlotte Center of the University of North Carolina in 1947. Woods was drafted by the Pittsburgh Steelers in the 1946 NFL draft.

== Head coaching record ==
Year	Team	Overall	Conference	Standing
CCUNC Owls (Independent) (1947)
1947	CCUNC	1–3		
CCUNC:		1–3		
Total:		1–3		
