= Butler College (Texas) =

Secondary school, and later college in Tyler, Texas, U.S.

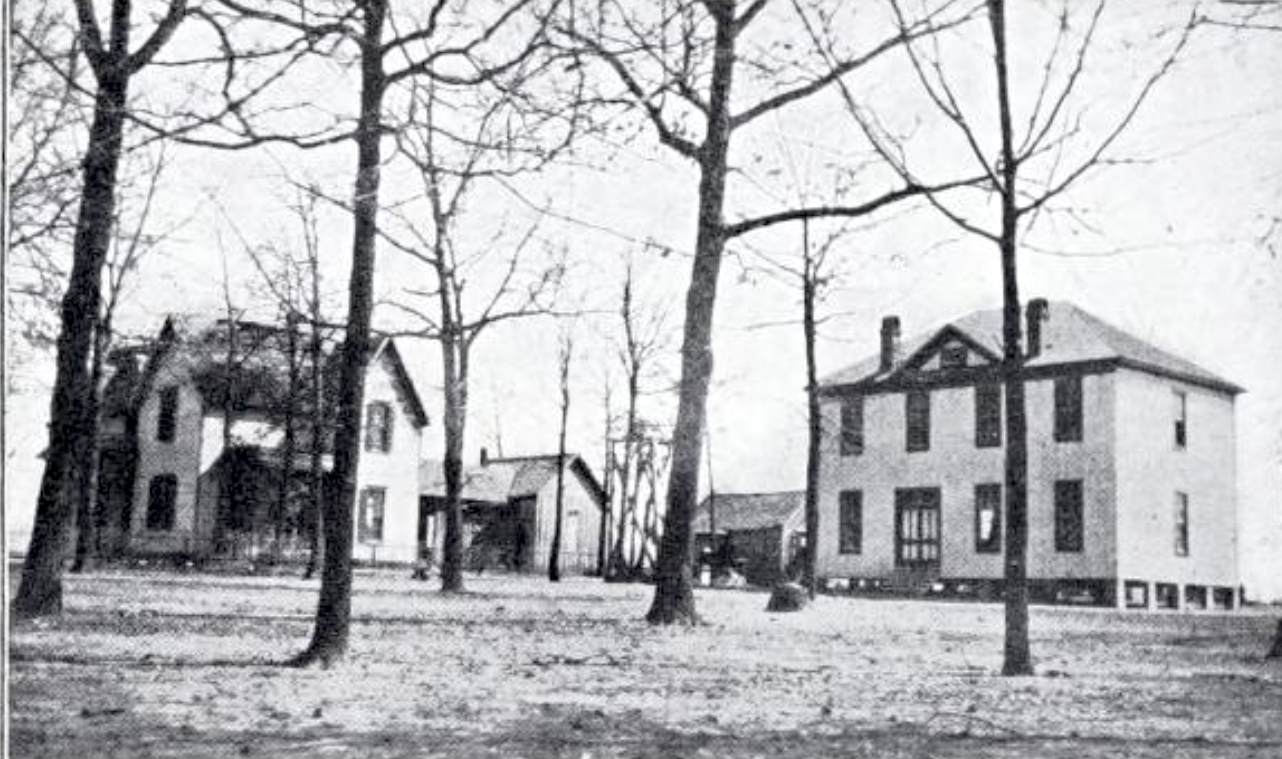
- Butler College (c. 1910)

Location
- Bellwood Road, Tyler, Smith County, Texas, U.S. 32.339988°N 95.321961°W

Information
- Former names: East Texas Normal and Industrial Academy, East Texas Baptist Academy
- Religious affiliation: Baptist
- Established: 1905
- Founder: Cornelius Moses Butler
- Closed: 1972
- Affiliation: East Texas Baptist Association; Texas Baptist Conference

Butler College (1905–1972) was an American co-educational black school in Tyler, Texas. It started as a combined elementary and high school, and became a junior college by 1924; by 1951, it was a senior college, before reverting back to a junior college in 1960. Butler College closed in 1972, after an enrollment decline. A historical plaque for Butler College (marker 15480) was erected near 1900 Bellwood Road by Texas Historical Commission in 2008.

== History ==
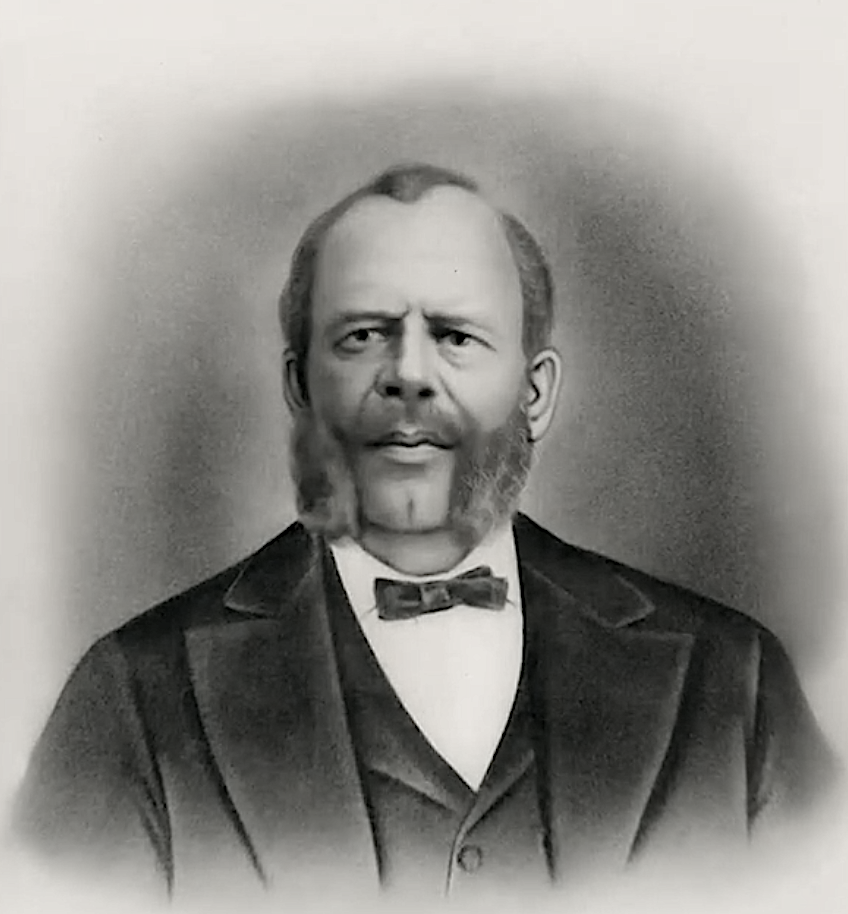
Cornelius Moses Butler (1844–1924)

Established in 1905 by the East Texas Baptist Association, the school was originally called the East Texas Normal and Industrial Academy, and was initially a combined elementary and high school, but some sources state it was originally named the East Texas Baptist Academy. Rev. C. M. Butler (or Cornelius Moses Butler; 1844–1924) served as the first president of the school, and he was the moderator of the East Texas Baptist Association. T. C. Bledsoe was the school's first principal.

By 1910, the school had 129 enrolled students and six teachers. The school introduced junior college-level courses in 1924, and the name was changed to Butler College following the death of its first president, Rev. C. M. Butler. In 1934 during the Great Depression, the Texas Baptist Conference became a co-sponsor of the college (gaining them financial support), with the East Texas Baptist Association owning and operating Butler College.

A few years after World War II, in 1951, Butler became a four-year senior college. As a four-year senior college it was never able to achieve accreditation, and by 1960, it reverted back to a junior college. Enrollment declined during the 1960s, and the college closed in 1972.

== Presidents ==
- Cornelius Moses Butler (1905–1924)
- J. V. Mc Clellan (1924–1932)
- Isaiah Jackson Jr. (1932–1945)
- William M. Butler (interim, 1945), son of Cornelius Moses Butler
- Milton K. Curry Jr. (1946–)

== See also ==
- Texas College
