= Hal Self =

American football player and coach (1922–2008)

Biographical details
- Born: February 22, 1922; Anderson, Alabama, U.S.
- Died: June 6, 2008 (aged 86)

Playing career
- 1941–1942: Alabama
- 1944–1946: Alabama
- Position: Quarterback

Coaching career (HC unless noted)
- 1947–1948: Athens HS (AL)
- 1949–1969: Florence State

Administrative career (AD unless noted)
- 1969: Florence State

Head coaching record
- Overall: 110–81–8 (college); 15–5 (high school)

Hal Self (February 22, 1922 – June 6, 2008) was an American football player and coach. He served as the head football coach at the University of North Alabama in Florence, Alabama from 1949 to 1969. As a quarterback at the University of Alabama, he played in all four major bowl games: Orange, Cotton, Sugar, and Rose. Self was drafted in the 14th round by the Brooklyn Tigers in the 1945 NFL draft but opted to stay in college.
