= Pensacola High School =

American public high school

Coordinates: 30.434288°N 87.224784°W

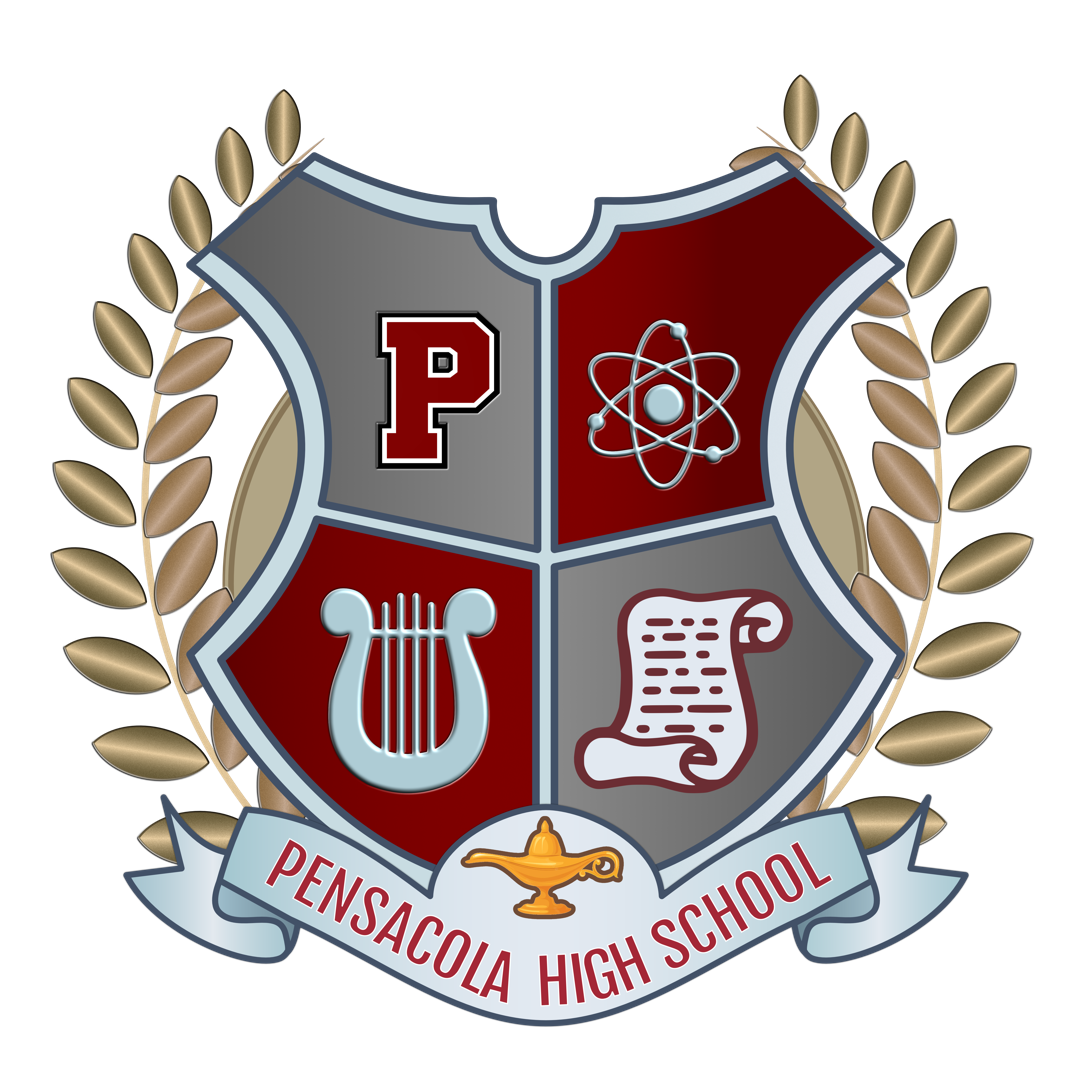

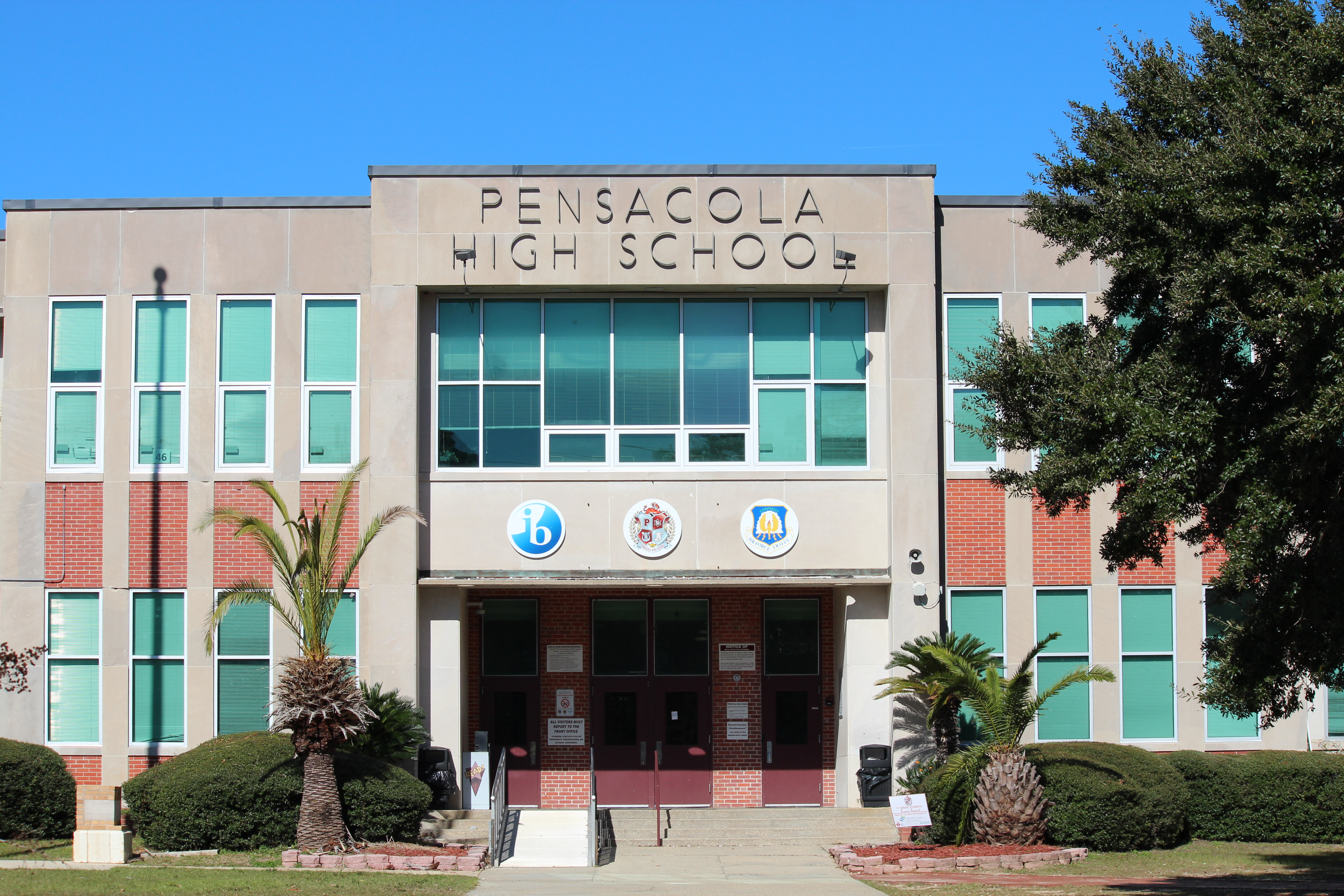
- The main entrance in 2024

Location
- 500 W Maxwell Street; Pensacola, Escambia County, Florida, Florida 32501-1664; United States

Information
- School type: Comprehensive Public High School; Magnet High School
- Motto: "Home of the Fighting Tigers!"
- Established: 1905
- Founder: Joseph Byrne Lockey
- Status: Open
- School district: Escambia County School District
- School code: 0411
- Dean: Jacquita Jenkins and Troy Floyd
- Principal: Amy Gordon
- Teaching staff: 48.00 (FTE)
- Grades: 9, 10, 11, 12
- Age range: 13 - 19
- Student to teacher ratio: 27.81
- Language: English, Spanish, French
- Hours in school day: Seven
- Colors: Maroon and white
- Mascot: Tiger
- Accreditation: Florida State Department of Education
- National ranking: #2,260
- Newspaper: Tiger's Tale (Ended in 2011)
- Yearbook: Annona (1905 - Present)
- Band: Fighting Tiger Band
- Website: pensacolahs.escambiaschools.org

Pensacola High School is a secondary school located near downtown Pensacola, Florida, United States.

The school celebrated its 100th anniversary in 2001 and graduated its 100th class of seniors in 2005; however, the school has not always been at its current location. It was moved to Maxwell Street in 1952. In 1969, a fire gutted the previous school building on Lee Square, prompting its demolition. Currently, it is the oldest secondary school in Pensacola.

The school is part of the Escambia County School District. A former principal, Norm Ross, is the deputy superintendent of schools for the county. Currently, the principal is Amy Gordon who previously served as Assistant Principal at Booker T. Washington High School for eight years.

After Hurricane Ivan, which struck the Pensacola area on September 16, 2004, Pensacola High School was damaged. While large renovations were needed, the school remained open and in operation. The gymnasium, which had only recently been remodeled, was demolished in June 2005. The auditorium was rebuilt in the spring of 2007, and the gymnasium was rebuilt in time for the 2008–2009 school year.

== Origins ==
The first public school for boys in Pensacola was organized in 1870. A two-story building on Wright Street was erected by the School Board in 1875. It was known as the Pensacola Academy and its principal was John Wilmer. In 1886, a new building was erected on Lee Square, known as Public School No. 1. Its first graduating class consisted of Albert Reed and J. Whiting Hyer.

In 1905, Pensacola Senior High School was organized in the Public School No. 1 building. The school was a four-year high school, and its first principal was J. B. Lockey. PHS's first graduating class consisted of Dudley Barrow and Nell Richards.

== International Baccalaureate ==
Pensacola High School is the only school in Escambia County to have an International Baccalaureate program. It is an application-based program, typically accepting applications in the fall of a student's 8th, 9th, or 10th grade year.

The International Baccalaureate program was introduced in 1986 and has been a well recognized program since. IB is a university-preparatory program and is designed to prepare students for admission to and success at prestigious universities.

IB program students must complete rigorous, college-level curriculum in addition to a Community Action Service project, an extended essay, and various other academic and social requirements in order to receive their IB diploma.

PHS IB is the only school in Northwest Florida with National Merit Commended Scholars, Semi-Finalists, and Finalists every year for the past 21 years. In addition, 15 students have been accepted into MIT in the last 16 years. At least one student every year has been accepted into a top Ivy League School

== Communities served ==
Most of Pensacola's historic North Hill community, sections of East Hill community, downtown Pensacola and towards Naval Air Station Pensacola, and Pensacola Beach are zoned for Pensacola High School.

Pensacola High School also serves students throughout Northwest Florida through magnet programs and career academies: International Baccalaureate Program, Scholar's Program, English Language Learner Program, Academy for Health Professions, Advanced Manufacturing Academy,Welding Academy Early Childhood Education Academy, Law and Public Service Academy, Sports Medicine Academy, and Culinary Arts Academy

Even though Pensacola Beach is zoned to Pensacola High School, most high-school students in Pensacola Beach attend Gulf Breeze High School, operated by Santa Rosa County School District.

== National recognition and prominence ==
In the news magazine Newsweek's published list of America's Top Public High Schools, Pensacola High School ranked as follows:

2003 - #188
2005 - #8
2006 - #38
2007 - #38
2008 - #42
2009 - #54

2010 - #22

2016 - The Washington Post named Pensacola High School in the top 10% of the hardest schools in America, ranking it number 35 out of several thousand.

== Notable alumni ==
Name	Class year	Notability	References
Reubin O'Donovan Askew	1946	Former governor of Florida	
Neal Boortz	1963	Former libertarian talk-show host	
Webbie Burnett		Football player	
Adron Chambers	2005	Former MLB outfielder (St. Louis Cardinals).	
Victor Floyd	1984	Former running back for the San Diego Chargers	
Jim Hutto	1966	Former MLB outfielder and catcher (Philadelphia Phillies, Baltimore Orioles).	
Fred Levin	1954	Civil trial lawyer for whom the University of Florida Fredric G. Levin College of Law is named; lawyer and adviser to boxer Roy Jones Jr.	
Max Macon		Former MLB pitcher and first baseman (St. Louis Cardinals, Brooklyn Dodgers and Boston Braves)	
Terrell McClain	2007	Former NFL defensive tackle and current defensive lineman for the Calgary Stampeders	
Damarious Randall	2009	Cornerback for the Cleveland Browns	
Eric Shaw	1989	Linebacker for the Cincinnati Bengals	
Michelle Snow	1998	WNBA basketball player and former University of Tennessee standout	
Kay Stephenson	1963	Former NFL player and coach	
John Webb	1997	Former MLB pitcher (Tampa Bay Rays).	
Mark Whiten	1985	Former Major League Baseball player who is famous for hitting 4 home runs in one game for the St. Louis Cardinals.	
