= Southern Benedictine College =

Catholic college in Cullman, Alabama, US

Coordinates: 34.18130°N 86.81807°W

- Former name: Saint Bernard College
- Type: Catholic Benedictine
- Active: 1929–1979
- Location: Cullman, Alabama, United States
- Nickname: Saints

Southern Benedictine College was a Catholic Benedictine college and seminary in Cullman, Alabama, United States. Previously called Saint Bernard College, it closed in 1979. Since then, the campus has since been repurposed into St. Bernard Preparatory School by the religious community of Benedictine monks.

== History ==
Saint Bernard College began conferring degrees in 1893 as a college preparatory school. Between 1948 and 1953, the board of trustees worked on expanding the institution to four-year-college status. The first college class graduated in 1955. A year later, Saint Bernard College received its accreditation as a senior college from the Southern Association of Colleges and Schools and operated until 1979. It served the secondary-educational needs of hundreds in the baby-boom generation. Many students arriving from the Philadelphia metropolitan area; New Jersey; Michigan; Georgia; New York; and Knoxville, Tennessee.

The college preparatory program was discontinued in 1979. At that time, the college had a national 1966 champion judo team. The school's golf team was ranked nationally in the NAIA Men's Championship in 1971. The soccer teams of the 1960s were highly-competitive and gained national ranking in NAIA especially after recruiting Neil O'Donoghue in 1972, who later played football for Auburn University and in the National Football League.

In 1976, the co-educational and former all male St. Bernard College merged with the co-educational Cullman College that was formerly all female and known as Sacred Heart College and the combined institution was named Southern Benedictine College, but Southern Benedictine lasted for only three years and officially closed on May 13, 1979. Southern Benedictine College was staffed by lay teachers, the Benedictine Brothers of St. Bernard Abbey and the Benedictine Sisters of Sacred Heart Monastery.

St. Bernard Preparatory School was reopened in 1984 on the Southern Benedictine campus and currently has a very promising private high school and seminary. The prep school received its accreditation in 1995.
