= 1949 Western Carolina Catamounts football team =

American college football season

1949 Western Carolina Catamounts football

NSC champion

Smoky Mountain Bowl, L 0–20 vs. West Liberty
- Conference: North State Conference
- Record: 8–3 (4–0 NSC)
- Head coach: Tom Young (4th season)
- Offensive scheme: Single-wing
- Home stadium: Memorial Stadium

1949 North State Conference football standings
| | Conf. | | | | | Overall |
| Team | W | | L | | T | W | | L | | T |
|---|---|---|---|---|---|---|---|---|---|---|
| Western Carolina $ | 4 | – | 0 | – | 0 | 8 | – | 3 | – | 0 |
| Appalachian State | 6 | – | 2 | – | 0 | 8 | – | 3 | – | 0 |
| Elon | 5 | – | 2 | – | 0 | 8 | – | 2 | – | 0 |
| Catawba | 4 | – | 2 | – | 0 | 5 | – | 5 | – | 0 |
| Lenoir Rhyne | 5 | – | 3 | – | 0 | 7 | – | 3 | – | 0 |
| Guilford | 2 | – | 3 | – | 1 | 4 | – | 5 | – | 1 |
| East Carolina | 1 | – | 4 | – | 1 | 4 | – | 5 | – | 1 |
| Atlantic Christian | 0 | – | 5 | – | 2 | 1 | – | 7 | – | 2 |
| High Point | 0 | – | 6 | – | 0 | 0 | – | 9 | – | 0 |
$ – Conference champion

The 1949 Western Carolina Catamounts team represented Western Carolina Teachers College (WCTC)—now known as Western Carolina University—as a member of the North State Conference (NSC) during the 1949 college football season. Led by fourth-year head coach Tom Young, the Catamounts compiled an overall record of 8–3 with a mark of 4–0 in conference play, winning the NSC title. Western Carolina was invited to the Smoky Mountain Bowl, where the Catamounts lost to West Liberty. The team employed a Single-wing formation on offense. Western Carolina played home games at Memorial Stadium in Cullowhee, North Carolina

== Schedule ==
| Date | Time | Opponent | Site | Result | Attendance | Source |
|---|---|---|---|---|---|---|
| September 17 | 8:00 p.m. | vs. High Point | Memorial Stadium; Asheville, NC | W 20–7 | 6,500 | |
| September 24 | | at Appalachian State | College Field; Boone, NC (rivalry) | W 13–6 | | |
| October 1 | | at Tusculum* | Greenville Burley Stadium; Greenville, TN | W 20–0 | 5,000 | |
| October 8 | 8:00 p.m. | at East Tennessee State* | State College Stadium; Johnson City, TN | W 10–21 | 8,000 | |
| October 15 | | vs. East Carolina | Canton Memorial Stadium; Canton, NC | W 19–6 | 4,500 | |
| October 22 | 8:00 p.m. | Lenoir Rhyne^{†} | Memorial Stadium; Cullowhee, NC | W 14–0 | 5,000 | |
| October 29 | | at Maryville (TN)* | Maryville, TN | L 13–20 | 3,000–5,000 | |
| November 5 | 8:15 p.m. | at Newberry | Seltzer Field; Newberry, SC | W 34–7 | | |
| November 12 | 8:00 p.m. | Emory and Henry* | Memorial Stadium; Cullowhee, NC | W 26–27 | | |
| November 19 | 7:30 p.m. | Carson–Newman* | Memorial Stadium; Cullowhee, NC | W 13–6 | | |
| November 24 | 2:30 p.m. | vs. West Liberty* | Bristol Municipal Stadium; Bristol, Tennessee (Smoky Mountain Bowl) | L 0–20 | | |
*Non-conference game; ^{†}Homecoming; All times are in Eastern time
