= 1950 Emory and Henry Wasps football team =

American college football season

1950 Emory and Henry Wasps football

Smokey Mountain champion Virginia Little Six champion Burley Bowl champion

Burley Bowl, W 26–6 vs. Appalachian State Tangerine Bowl, L 14–35 vs. Morris Harvey
- Conference: Smoky Mountain Conference, Virginia Little Six Conference
- Record: 10–2 (4–0 Smoky Mountain, 2–0 Virginia Little Six)
- Head coach: Conley Snidow (3rd season)
- Offensive scheme: Split-T
- Home stadium: Bristol Municipal Stadium, Fullerton Field

1950 Smoky Mountain Conference football standings
	Conf.					Overall
Team	W		L		T	W		L		T
Emory and Henry $	4	–	0	–	0	10	–	2	–	0
Carson–Newman	2	–	1	–	1	3	–	5	–	1
Milligan	1	–	1	–	2	3	–	4	–	2
East Tennessee State	1	–	2	–	1	3	–	5	–	1
Tusculum	0	–	4	–	0	2	–	6	–	0
$ – Conference champion

1950 Virginia Little Six Conference football standings
	Conf.					Overall
Team	W		L		T	W		L		T
Emory and Henry $	2	–	0	–	0	10	–	2	–	0
Randolph–Macon	2	–	1	–	0	5	–	4	–	0
Bridgewater	0	–	1	–	0	0	–	6	–	0
Hampden–Sydney	0	–	2	–	0	4	–	5	–	0
$ – Conference champion

The 1950 Emory and Henry Wasps football team represented Emory and Henry College as a member of the Smoky Mountain Conference and the Virginia Little Six Conference during the 1950 college football season. Led by third-year head coach Conley Snidow, the Wasps compiled an overall record of 10–2 with marks of 4–0 in Smoky Mountain play and 2–0 against Virginia Little Six opponents, winning both conference titles. Emory and Henry was invited to the Burley Bowl, where the Wasps beat Appalachian State, and the Tangerine Bowl, where the team fell to Morris Harvey. Emory and Henry played three home games at Bristol Municipal Stadium in Bristol, Tennessee and three at Fullerton Field in Emory, Virginia.

== Schedule ==
Date	Time	Opponent	Site	Result	Attendance	Source
September 16		Elon*	Bristol Municipal Stadium; Bristol, TN	W 33–12	5,000	
September 23	8:00 p.m.	Milligan	Bristol Municipal Stadium; Bristol, TN	W 41–0		
September 30	8:00 p.m.	Carson–Newman	Bristol Municipal Stadium; Bristol, TN	W 39–20	4,400	
October 7		at Hampden–Sydney	Hampden Sydney, VA	W 48–21		
October 14	8:00 p.m.	at Guilford	Senior High Stadium; Greensboro, NC	L 20–21	2,000	
October 21		at Maryville (TN)*	Maryville, TN	W 56–0		
October 28	2:00 p.m.	Tusculum^{†}	Fullerton Field; Emory, VA	W 47–0	5,000	
November 4	8:00 p.m.	at Eastern Tennessee State	State College Stadium; Johnson City, TN	W 19–0		
November 11	2:00 p.m.	Western Carolina*	Fullerton Field; Emory, VA	W 41–0		
November 18	2:00 p.m.	Randolph–Macon	Fullerton Field; Emory, VA	W 32–20		
November 23	2:15 p.m.	vs. Appalachian State*	Roosevelt Memorial Stadium; Johnson City, TN (Burley Bowl)	W 26–6	12,000	
January 1	8:00 p.m.	vs. Morris Harvey*	Tangerine Bowl; Orlando, FL (Tangerine Bowl)	L 14–35	10,000	
*Non-conference game; ^{†}Homecoming; All times are in Eastern time
