= 1949 Emory and Henry Wasps football team =

American college football season

1949 Emory and Henry Wasps football

Smokey Mountain champion Virginia Little Six champion Burley Bowl champion

Burley Bowl, W 32–0 vs. Hanover (IN) Tangerine Bowl, L 6–7 vs. Saint Vincent
- Conference: Smoky Mountain Conference, Virginia Little Six Conference
- Record: 11–1 (4–0 Smoky Mountain, 2–0 Virginia Little Six)
- Head coach: Conley Snidow (2nd season)
- Offensive scheme: Split-T
- Captains: Jim Painter; Chick Davis?
- Home stadium: Bristol Municipal Stadium, Fullerton Field

1949 Smoky Mountain Conference football standings
	Conf.					Overall
Team	W		L		T	W		L		T
Emory and Henry $	4	–	0	–	0	11	–	1	–	0
East Tennessee State	3	–	1	–	0	5	–	4	–	0
Milligan	1	–	2	–	1	3	–	5	–	2
Carson–Newman	1	–	3	–	0	2	–	7	–	1
Tusculum	0	–	3	–	1	2	–	5	–	1
$ – Conference champion

1949 Virginia Little Six Conference football standings
	Conf.					Overall
Team	W		L		T	W		L		T
Emory and Henry $	2	–	0	–	0	11	–	1	–	0
Hampden–Sydney	1	–	1	–	0	5	–	4	–	0
Bridgewater	0	–	0	–	0	1	–	3	–	0
Randolph–Macon	0	–	2	–	0	2	–	7	–	0
$ – Conference champion

The 1949 Emory and Henry Wasps football team represented Emory and Henry College during the 1949 college football season. In Conley Snidow's second season as head coach, the Wasps compiled a 11–1 record and outscored their opponents by a total of 323 to 121. Emory and Henry won two conference championships, with a 4–0 record in the Smoky Mountain Conference and a 2–0 record in the first season of competition for the Virginia Little Six Conference. Another rarity was Emory and Henry's two postseason bowl games, a Thanksgiving Day game against the Hanover Panthers in the Burley Bowl and a contest against Saint Vincent in the Tangerine Bowl. The Wasps were also named Virginia Sports team of the Year by the Associated Press in December.

== Schedule ==
Date	Time	Opponent	Site	Result	Attendance	Source
September 17		vs. Concord*	Bluefield, WV	W 19–7	6,000	
September 24		vs. Milligan	Bristol Municipal Stadium; Bristol, TN	W 27–7		
October 1		at Carson–Newman	Jefferson City, TN	W 19–14		
October 8		vs. Hampden–Sydney	Bristol Municipal Stadium?; Bristol, TN	W 28–0		
October 15		vs. Guilford*	Bristol Municipal Stadium?; Bristol, TN	W 27–7		
October 22		Maryville (TN)*^{†}	Fullerton Field; Emory, VA	W 38–17	4,000	
October 29		at Tusculum	Greenville, TN	W 32–6		
November 5		East Tennessee State	Bristol Municipal Stadium; Bristol, TN	W 34–7		
November 12	8:00 p.m.	at Western Carolina*	Memorial Stadium; Cullowhee, NC	W 27–26		
November 19		at Randolph–Macon	Ashland, VA	W 32–6		
November 24	2:15 p.m.	vs. Hanover*	Memorial Stadium; Johnson City, TN (Burley Bowl)	W 35–0	12,000	
January 2		vs. Saint Vincent*	Tangerine Bowl Stadium; Orlando, FL (Tangerine Bowl)	L 6–7	9,500	
*Non-conference game; ^{†}Homecoming; All times are in Eastern time

== Second team schedule ==
Date	Opponent	Site	Result	Source
October 14 or 15	Eastern Tennessee State Seconds*	Fullerton Field; Emory, VA	W 13–6	
*Non-conference game
