= Ryan Jenkins =

Ryan Jenkins may refer to:

- Ryan Jenkins (entrepreneur) (1977–2009), Canadian reality show contestant and real estate entrepreneur, suspected killer of Jasmine Fiore
- Ryan Jenkins (baseball) (born 1987), American college baseball coach
