= Loyd Roberts =

American sports coach and administrator (1907–1989)

- Roberts, c. 1929

Biographical details
- Born: 1907; Stigler, Oklahoma, U.S.
- Died: July 4, 1989 (aged 82); Johnson City, Tennessee, U.S.

Playing career

Football
- 1929–1930: Tulane

Basketball
- 1928–1931: Tulane
- Position: Center (football)

Coaching career (HC unless noted)

Football
- c. 1931–1940: Homer HS (LA)
- 1941: Arkansas State Teachers
- 1944: Iowa State (line)
- 1946: VMI (line)
- 1947–1951: East Tennessee State

Basketball
- c. 1931–1941: Homer HS (LA)
- 1941–1942: Central Arkansas
- 1946–1947: VMI
- 1947–1948: East Tennessee State

Administrative career (AD unless noted)
- 1941–1942: Arkansas State Teachers
- 1947–1953: East Tennessee State

Head coaching record
- Overall: 26–26–2 (college football); 36–25 (college basketball)

Accomplishments and honors

Awards
- Third-team All-American (1930); 2× All-Southern (1929, 1930)

Loyd Thomas "Preacher" Roberts (1907 – July 4, 1989) was an American college football and college basketball player and coach. He played football and basketball at Tulane University. Roberts served as the head football coach at Arkansas State Teachers College—now known as the University of Central Arkansas in 1941 and East Tennessee State College—now known as East Tennessee State University—from 1947 to 1951, compiling a career college football coaching record of 26–26–2. He was also the head basketball coach at Arkansas State Teachers in 1941–42, the Virginia Military Institute (VMI) in 1946–47, and East Tennessee State in 1947–48, tallying a career college basketball mark of 36–25.

== Playing career ==
Roberts played both football and basketball for the Tulane Green Wave of Tulane University in New Orleans, Louisiana. His brother, Floyd Roberts, was called "Little Preacher" and played as a halfback for Tulane next to Don Zimmerman.

=== Football ===
Roberts was a prominent center for Tulane Green Wave football team, including the Southern Conference (SoCon) championship football teams of 1929 and 1930, quarterbacked by Red Dawson. Roberts wore number 45.

==== 1929 ====
Roberts anchored the line on the undefeated SoCon champion 1929 team.

==== 1930 ====
Roberts was elected captain of the 1930 team. He was selected All-Southern.

== Coaching career ==
=== Central Arkansas ===
Roberts spent a year coaching for the Central Arkansas Bears, compiling a record of 3–6.

=== VMI ===
After serving in the United States Navy as a lieutenant during World War II, Roberts was hired as line coach at the Virginia Military Institute (VMI), working under head football coach Pooley Hubert.

=== East Tennessee State ===
Roberts spent five seasons as the head football coach at East Tennessee State University in Johnson City, Tennessee from 1947 to 1951, compiling a record of 23–20–2. He also served as the basketball coach for one season in 1947–48 and was the athletic director from 1947 to 1953.

== Death ==
Thomas died on July 4, 1989, at Johnson City Medical Center in Johnson City, Tennessee.

== Head coaching record ==
=== College football ===
Year	Team	Overall	Conference	Standing	Bowl/playoffs
Arkansas State Teachers Bears (Arkansas Intercollegiate Conference) (1941)
1941	Arkansas State Teachers	3–6			
Arkansas State Teachers:		3–6			
East Tennessee State Buccaneers (Independent) (1947–1948)
1947	East Tennessee State	5–4			
1948	East Tennessee State	6–2–1			
East Tennessee State Buccaneers (Smoky Mountain Conference) (1949)
1949	East Tennessee State	5–4	3–1	2nd	
East Tennessee State Buccaneers (Smoky Mountain Conference / Volunteer State Athletic Conference) (1950–1951)
1950	East Tennessee State	3–5–1	1–2–1 / 0–1–1	4th / 4th	
1951	East Tennessee State	4–5	1–1	2nd	
East Tennessee State:		23–20–2	5–4–1		
Total:		26–26–2			
