= Snidow =

Snidow is a surname. Notable people with the surname include:

- Conley Snidow (1916–2007), American football and basketball coach and college athletics administrator
- Ron Snidow (1941–2009), American football player
