= 1949 Hanover Panthers football team =

American college football season

1949 Hanover Panthers football

Hoosier Conference champion

Burley Bowl, L 0–32 vs. Emory and Henry
- Conference: Hoosier Conference
- Record: 8–1 (6–0 Hoosier)
- Head coach: Garland Frazier (1st season)
- Captain: Bob Horn

1949 Hoosier Conference football standings
	Conf.					Overall
Team	W		L		T	W		L		T
Hanover $	6	–	0	–	0	8	–	1	–	0
Anderson (IN)	5	–	1	–	0	6	–	2	–	0
Taylor	2	–	1	–	2	4	–	3	–	2
Indiana Central	3	–	4	–	0	4	–	4	–	0
Franklin (IN)	2	–	3	–	1	3	–	4	–	1
Canterbury	2	–	3	–	1	2	–	5	–	1
Earlham	2	–	3	–	0	3	–	6	–	0
Rose Poly	1	–	3	–	1	4	–	3	–	1
Manchester (IN)	0	–	5	–	1	1	–	6	–	1
$ – Conference champion

The 1949 Hanover Panthers football team was an American football team that represented Hanover College, of Hanover, Indiana, as a member of the Hoosier Conference during the 1949 college football season. In their first season under head coach Garland Frazier, the Panthers compiled an 8–1 record (6–0 in conference games), won the Hoosier Conference championship, and outscored opponents by a total of 280 to 65. They lost to Emory and Henry in the Burley Bowl.

Hank Treesh was the team's leading scorer with 13 touchdowns for 78 points.

== Schedule ==
Date	Time	Opponent	Site	Result	Attendance	Source
September 24		Canterbury	Madison, IN	W 42–0		
October 1		at Earlham	Richmond, IN	W 20–0		
October 8		DePauw*	Madison, IN	W 27–7		
October 15		at Rose Poly	Rose Field; Terre Haute, IN	W 62–0		
October 22		at Centre*	Danville, KY	W 27–6		
October 29		Franklin (IN)^{†}	Hanover, IN	W 54–14		
November 5		Indiana Central	Manual Field; Indianapolis, IN	W 21–6	2,000	
November 12		Manchester (IN)	Madison, IN	W 27–0		
November 24	1:15 p.m.	vs. Emory and Henry*	Memorial Stadium; Johnson City, TN (Burley Bowl)	L 0–32	12,000	
*Non-conference game; ^{†}Homecoming; All times are in Central time

== Game summaries ==
=== Canterbury ===
On September 24, Hanover opened its season with a 42–0 victory over Canterbury at home in Madison, Indiana. Hank Treesh, who led Indiana in scoring in 1948, scored two touchdowns in the game. Jim Peterson threw two touchdown passes, including one good for a 66-yard gain to Bill Klein. Hanover also scored on a safety in the second quarter. Canterbury never moved the ball beyond Hanover's 47-yard line and had only two first downs.

=== Rose Poly ===
On October 15, Hanover defeated the Rose Poly Engineers, 62–0, at Rose Field in Terre Haute, Indiana. It was Hanover's highest point total of the year. The Terre Haute newspaper wrote that Hank Treesh "was constantly tearing the Rose line to shreds with his off tackle slants and end skirting." Treesh scored three touchdowns in the game. Quarterback Jim Peterson also had a solid game, passing for 190 yards. Guy Andreas kicked eight extra points. Hanover tallied a total of 561 yards from scrimmage while holding Rose to only 67 yards.

=== Franklin ===
On October 29, Hanover played its homecoming game, defeating Franklin (IN) by a 54–14 score. Quarterback Jim Peterson threw two touchdown passes and led the offense to eight touchdowns in all. Howard Conrad and Tom Houser scored two touchdowns each, and Guy Andreas kicked six extra points.

=== Indiana Central ===
On November 5, Hanover defeated the Indiana Central Greyhounds, 21–6, before a crowd of 2,000 at Manual Field in Indianapolis. Quarterback failed to complete any of his eight passes and threw one interception. Hanover's rushing attack accounted for 308 yards.

=== Burley Bowl (vs Emory and Henry) ===
On November 24, Hanover lost by a 32–0 acore to Emory and Henry in the Burley Bowl in Johnson City, Tennessee. Emory and Henry's 32 points was one point shy of the 33 points scored by all of Hanover's opponents during the regular season. All of Emory and Henry's points were scored in the first half, and neither team scored in the second half. It was the most one-sided game in Burley Bowl history. As the winner, Emory and Henry advanced to the 1950 Tangerine Bowl.
