= Garland Frazier =

American sports coach (1917–1991)

Biographical details
- Born: April 5, 1917; Terre Haute, Indiana, U.S.
- Died: January 11, 1991 (aged 73)
- Education: Ball State (1941)

Playing career

Football
- 1938–1940: Ball State
- 1944: Norman NAS

Track
- c. 1940: Ball State
- Positions: Fullback, tackle (football)

Coaching career (HC unless noted)

Football
- 1946–1948: Bicknell HS (IN)
- 1949–1950: Hanover
- 1951–1960: Wabash

Basketball
- 1946–1949: Bicknell HS (IN)
- 1949–1950: Hanover

Basketball
- 1946–1949: Bicknell HS (IN)
- c. 1950: Hanover

Head coaching record
- Overall: 59–41–7 (college football); 15–11 (college basketball)
- Bowls: 0–1

Accomplishments and honors

Championships
- Football; 1 Hoosier (1949)

Garland D. Frazier (April 5, 1917 – January 11, 1991) was an American football, basketball, and track and field coach. He served as the head football coach at Hanover College in Hanover, Indiana from 1949 to 1950 and Wabash College in Crawfordsville, Indiana from 1951 to 1960, compiling a career college football coaching record of 59–41–7. Frazier was also the head basketball coach at Hanover for one season, in 1949–1950, tallying a mark of 15–11.

== Playing career and military service ==
Frazier attended Bicknell High School in Bicknell, Indiana, where he played football and basketball, before graduating in 1935. He moved on to Indiana University, lettering for the freshman football team in 1935. Frazier transferred to Ball State Teachers College—now known as Ball State University—Muncie, Indiana, where played for three seasons as a fullback and lettered in track.

After graduating from Ball State in 1940 with a Bachelor of Science in physical education in 1940, he briefly taught and coached basketball in Guilford, Indiana before joining the United States Navy. During World War II, he was stationed at Naval Air Station Norman in Norman, Oklahoma. There he played for the Norman Naval Air Station Zoomers football as a tackle and was a teammate of Emil Sitko, who later started at the University of Notre Dame and in the National Football League (NFL).

== Coaching career ==
After earning a master's degree from the University of Oklahoma, Frazier returned to Bicknell High School in 1946, where he coached football, basketball, and track for three seasons.

Frazier was the 24th head football coach at Wabash College in Crawfordsville, Indiana, serving for ten seasons, from 1951 to 1960, and compiling a record of 48–35–6.

== Head coaching record ==
=== College football ===
Year	Team	Overall	Conference	Standing	Bowl/playoffs
Hanover Panthers (Hoosier Conference) (1949–1950)
1949	Hanover	8–1	6–0	1st	L Burley Bowl
1950	Hanover	3–5–1	3–2	T–3rd	
Hanover:		11–6–1	8–2		
Wabash Little Giants (Independent) (1951–1960)
1951	Wabash	7–0–1			
1952	Wabash	5–4			
1953	Wabash	6–2–1			
1954	Wabash	7–1–1			
1955	Wabash	5–3–1			
1956	Wabash	6–2–1			
1957	Wabash	5–4			
1958	Wabash	3–6			
1959	Wabash	3–5–1			
1960	Wabash	1–8			
Wabash:		48–35–6			
Total:		59–41–7			
National championship Conference title Conference division title or championship game berth
