= 1951 Emory and Henry Wasps football team =

American college football season

1951 Emory and Henry Wasps football

Smokey Mountain champion Virginia Little Six champion
- Conference: Smoky Mountain Conference, Virginia Little Six Conference
- Record: 9–0–1 (2–0 Smoky Mountain, 2–0 Virginia Little Six)
- Head coach: Conley Snidow (4th season)
- Offensive scheme: Split-T
- Home stadium: Bristol Municipal Stadium, Fullerton Field

1951 Smoky Mountain Conference football standings
	Conf.					Overall
Team	W		L		T	W		L		T
Emory and Henry $	2	–	0	–	0	9	–	0	–	1
East Tennessee State	1	–	1	–	0	4	–	5	–	0
Carson–Newman	0	–	2	–	0	4	–	6	–	0
$ – Conference champion

1951 Virginia Little Six Conference football standings
	Conf.					Overall
Team	W		L		T	W		L		T
Emory and Henry $	2	–	0	–	0	9	–	0	–	1
Randolph–Macon	1	–	1	–	1	5	–	3	–	1
Hampden–Sydney	1	–	1	–	1	4	–	3	–	2
Bridgewater	0	–	2	–	0	1	–	3	–	0
$ – Conference champion

The 1951 Emory and Henry Wasps football team represented Emory and Henry College as a member of the Smoky Mountain Conference and the Virginia Little Six Conference during the 1951 college football season. Led by fourth-year head coach Conley Snidow, the Wasps compiled an overall record of 9–0–1 with marks of 2–0 in Smoky Mountain play and 2–0 against Virginia Little Six opponents, winning both conference titles. Emory and Henry played three home games at Bristol Municipal Stadium in Bristol, Tennessee and one at Fullerton Field in Emory, Virginia. The Wasps featured a split-T offense.

== Schedule ==
Date	Time	Opponent	Site	Result	Attendance	Source
September 15		Elon*	Bristol Municipal Stadium; Bristol, TN	W 20–14	5,000	
September 22		vs. Concord*	Municipal Stadium; Bluefield, WV	W 40–12		
September 29		at Carson–Newman	Jefferson City, TN	W 21–6		
October 6		Hampden–Sydney^{†}	Fullerton Field; Emory, VA	W 33–7	5,000	
October 13	8:00 p.m.	Guilford*	Bristol Municipal Stadium; Bristol, TN	W 35–6	7,000	
October 20	2:00 p.m.	vs. Maryville (TN)*	Latture Field; Abingdon, VA	W 38–12		
October 26	8:30 p.m.	at Middle Tennessee*	Horace Jones Field; Murfreesboro, TN	T 20–20		
November 3	8:00 p.m.	Eastern Tennessee State	Bristol Municipal Stadium; Bristol, TN	W 28–7		
November 10	8:00 p.m.	at Western Carolina*	Memorial Stadium; Cullowhee, NC	W 13–7		
November 17	2:00 p.m.	at Randolph–Macon	Ashland, VA	W 39–20		
*Non-conference game; ^{†}Homecoming; All times are in Eastern time
