= Brad Goss =

American college baseball coach

Biographical details
- Born: Russellville, Arkansas

Playing career
- 2001–2004: Arkansas Tech
- Position: Catcher

Coaching career (HC unless noted)
- 2005–2013: UT Martin (Asst.)
- 2014: UT Martin (Interim HC)

Brad Goss in an American college baseball coach and former catcher. He played college baseball at Arkansas Tech University. Goss served as the interim head baseball coach at the University of Tennessee at Martin during the 2014 season.

Goss played baseball at Arkansas Tech, where he continues to appear in record books in many offensive categories. He became a graduate assistant and volunteer assistant coach at UT Martin, and was later named the first ever full-time assistant coach of the Skyhawks. After Bubba Cates was relieved of duties, Goss was named interim coach for the 2014 season. The program finished 9–42 during the season, after which Rick Robinson was hired as the head coach.

== Head coaching record ==
The following is a table of Goss's yearly records as an NCAA head coach.

Record table
Season	Team	Overall	Conference	Standing	Postseason
UT Martin Skyhawks (Ohio Valley Conference) (2014)
2014	UT Martin	9–42	5–25	11th	
UT Martin:		9–42	5–25		
Total:		9–42			
National champion Postseason invitational champion Conference regular season champion Conference regular season and conference tournament champion Division regular season champion Division regular season and conference tournament champion Conference tournament champion
