= 1949 East Tennessee State Buccaneers football team =

American college football season

1949 East Tennessee State Buccaneers football
- Conference: Smoky Mountain Conference
- Record: 5–4 (3–1 Smoky Mountain)
- Head coach: Loyd Roberts (3rd season)
- Captain: Bob Tranburger
- Home stadium: State College Stadium

1949 Smoky Mountain Conference football standings
| | Conf. | | | | | Overall |
| Team | W | | L | | T | W | | L | | T |
|---|---|---|---|---|---|---|---|---|---|---|
| Emory and Henry $ | 4 | – | 0 | – | 0 | 11 | – | 1 | – | 0 |
| East Tennessee State | 3 | – | 1 | – | 0 | 5 | – | 4 | – | 0 |
| Milligan | 1 | – | 2 | – | 1 | 3 | – | 5 | – | 2 |
| Carson–Newman | 1 | – | 3 | – | 0 | 2 | – | 7 | – | 1 |
| Tusculum | 0 | – | 3 | – | 1 | 2 | – | 5 | – | 1 |
$ – Conference champion

The 1949 East Tennessee State Buccaneers football team was an American football team that represented East Tennessee State College (ETSC)—now known as East Tennessee State University—as a member of the Smoky Mountain Conference during the 1949 college football season. Led by third-year head coach Loyd Roberts, the Buccaneers compiled an ovferall record of 5–4, with a mark of 3–1 in conference play, placing second among Smoky Mountains teams. The Buccaneers had become a force to reckon with during the postwar years with the emergence of quarterback Jack Vest in the late 1940s. Bob Tranburger served his second term as co-captain of the team and was the first Buccaneer to be named to an All-American (Paul B. Williams) team.

== Schedule ==
| Date | Time | Opponent | Site | Result | Attendance | Source |
|---|---|---|---|---|---|---|
| September 24 | | Tennessee Wesleyan* | Johnson City, TN | W 19–6 | | |
| October 1 | | Erskine* | Johnson City, TN | W 20–13 | | |
| October 8 | 8:00 p.m. | Western Carolina*^{†} | State College Stadium; Johnson City, TN | L 0–14 | 8,000 | |
| October 15 | | at Maryville (TN)* | Maryville, TN | L 19–20 | | |
| October 22 | | Carson–Newman | Johnson City, TN | W 13–12 | | |
| October 28 | | at Middle Tennessee* | Horace Jones Field; Murfreesboro, TN | L 0–30 | | |
| November 5 | | at Emory and Henry | Bristol Municipal Stadium; Bristol, TN | L 7–34 | | |
| November 12 | | Tusculum | Johnson City, TN | W 19–0 | | |
| November 19 | | Milligan | Johnson City, TN | W 28–0 | | |
*Non-conference game; ^{†}Homecoming; All times are in Eastern time
