= UT Martin Skyhawks baseball =

Baseball team

- 2026 UT Martin Skyhawks baseball team
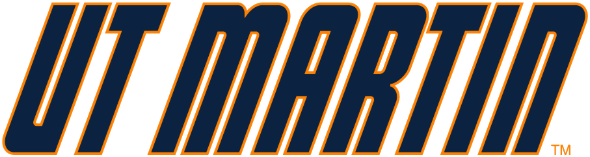
- Founded: 1957; 69 years ago
- University: University of Tennessee at Martin
- Head coach: Ryan Jenkins (9th season)
- Conference: Ohio Valley Conference
- Location: Martin, TN
- Home stadium: Skyhawk Baseball Field (Capacity: 500)
- Nickname: Skyhawks
- Colors: Navy blue, orange, and white

NCAA tournament appearances
- Division II: 1971, 1986

The UT Martin Skyhawks baseball team represents the University of Tennessee at Martin, which is located in Martin, Tennessee. The Skyhawks are an NCAA Division I college baseball program that competes in the Ohio Valley Conference. They began competing in Division I in 1993 and joined the Ohio Valley Conference the same season.

The UT Martin Skyhawks play all home games on campus at Skyhawk Baseball Field. Over their 27 seasons in the Ohio Valley Conference, they have played in four OVC Tournaments. The Skyhawks have yet to play in the NCAA Division I Tournament.

Since the program's inception in 1957, one Skyhawk has gone on to play in Major League Baseball, pitcher Alec Mills. Three other Skyhawks have been drafted.

== Conference membership history (Division I only) ==
- 1993–present: Ohio Valley Conference

== Skyhawk Park ==
Skyhawk Park is a baseball stadium on the UT Martin campus in Martin, Tennessee that seats 500 people. It opened in 1974.

== NCAA Tournament appearances ==
=== Division II ===
During their time in Division II, the Skyhawks reached the NCAA Division II baseball tournament twice.

Year	Record	Pct	Notes
1971	1–2	.333	Mideast Regional
1986	1-2	.333	South Atlantic Regional
TOTALS	2–4	.333	

== Head coaches (Division I only) ==
Records taken from the 2020 UTM baseball media guide.

Season	Coach	Years	Record	Pct.
1993–1998	Vernon Prather	6	83–178–3	.318
1999–2013	Bubba Cates	15	224–560–1	.286
2014	Brad Goss	1	9–42	.184
2015–2017	Rick Robinson	3	61–100	.379
2018–present	Ryan Jenkins	7	114–214	.348
Totals	5 coaches	32 seasons	491–1,094–4	.310

== Year-by-year NCAA Division I results ==
Records taken from the 2020 UTM baseball media guide.

Statistics overview
Season	Coach	Overall	Conference	Standing	Postseason
Ohio Valley Conference (1993–present)
1993	Vernon Prather	13–28–1	7–13	7th	
1994	Vernon Prather	13–25	8–13	7th	
1995	Vernon Prather	13–34	2–18	7th	
1996	Vernon Prather	14–30–2	6–15–1	8th	OVC Tournament
1997	Vernon Prather	15–30	8–16	T-8th	
1998	Vernon Prather	15–31	6–18	9th	
1999	Bubba Cates	15–39	4–20	9th	
2000	Bubba Cates	10–41	2–21	9th	
2001	Bubba Cates	8–46	3–18	8th	
2002	Bubba Cates	8–33	4–15	8th	
2003	Bubba Cates	17–30–1	6–13–1	7th	
2004	Bubba Cates	16–38	7–20	T-9th	
2005	Bubba Cates	12–43	6–20	T-9th	
2006	Bubba Cates	20–35	9–18	8th	
2007	Bubba Cates	19–36	7–19	10th	
2008	Bubba Cates	10–41	5–20	10th	
2009	Bubba Cates	21–30	10–14	8th	
2010	Bubba Cates	24–31	8–16	T-8th	
2011	Bubba Cates	20–36	10–13	6th	OVC Tournament
2012	Bubba Cates	13–41	7–20	10th	
2013	Bubba Cates	11–40	4–26	11th	
2014	Brad Goss	9–42	5–25	11th	
2015	Rick Robinson	17–35	9–20	10th	
2016	Rick Robinson	19–35	9–21	9th	
2017	Rick Robinson	25–30	12–18	T-8th	OVC Tournament
2018	Ryan Jenkins	11–40	7–22	10th	
2019	Ryan Jenkins	25–31	12–18	8th	OVC Tournament
Total:		413–951–4			
National champion Postseason invitational champion Conference regular season champion Conference regular season and conference tournament champion Division regular season champion Division regular season and conference tournament champion Conference tournament champion

== Awards and honors (Division I only) ==
- Over their 27 seasons in the Ohio Valley Conference, 5 different Skyhawks have been named to the all-conference first-team.

=== Freshman First-Team All-Americans ===
Year	Position	Name	Selector
2008	1B	Wes Patterson	CB
2011	DH	Phil Sorensen	CB
2014	DH	Ben Upton	CB
2017	OF	Connor Aube	CB
2018	1B	Ethan Whitley	CB

Taken from the 2020 UTM baseball media guide. Updated March 9, 2020.

== Skyhawks in the Major Leagues ==
= All-Star	= Baseball Hall of Famer

Athlete	Years in MLB	MLB teams
Alec Mills	2016, 2018–present	Kansas City Royals, Chicago Cubs

Taken from the 2020 UTM baseball media guide. Updated March 9, 2020.

== See also ==
- List of NCAA Division I baseball programs
