= 1950 East Tennessee State Buccaneers football team =

American college football season

1950 East Tennessee State Buccaneers football
- Conference: Smoky Mountain Conference, Volunteer State Athletic Conference
- Record: 3–5–1 (1–2–1 Smoky Mountain, 0–1–1 VSAC)
- Head coach: Loyd Roberts (4th season)
- Captains: Mark Sutherland; Bob "Snake" Evans
- Home stadium: State College Stadium

1950 Smoky Mountain Conference football standings
	Conf.					Overall
Team	W		L		T	W		L		T
Emory and Henry $	4	–	0	–	0	10	–	2	–	0
Carson–Newman	2	–	1	–	1	3	–	5	–	1
Milligan	1	–	1	–	2	3	–	4	–	2
East Tennessee State	1	–	2	–	1	3	–	5	–	1
Tusculum	0	–	4	–	0	2	–	6	–	0
$ – Conference champion

1950 Volunteer State Athletic Conference football standings
	Conf.					Overall
Team	W		L		T	W		L		T
Middle Tennessee $	4	–	0	–	0	9	–	2	–	0
Milligan	1	–	1	–	1	3	–	4	–	2
Austin Peay	1	–	2	–	0	5	–	2	–	1
East Tennessee State	0	–	1	–	1	3	–	5	–	1
Union (TN)	0	–	2	–	0	2	–	8	–	0
$ – Conference champion

The 1950 East Tennessee State Buccaneers football team was an American football team that represented East Tennessee State College (ETSC)—now known as East Tennessee State University—as a member of the Smoky Mountain Conference and the Volunteer State Athletic Conference (VSAC) during the 1950 college football season. Led by fourth-year head coach Loyd Roberts, the Buccaneers compiled an overall a record of 3–5–1, with marks of 1–2–1 against Smoky Mountain opponents and 0–1–1 in VSAC play. This was the program's first losing record under Roberts and the first losing season since 1941. The team's co-captains were Mark Sutherland and Bob "Snake" Evans. The 1950 squad beat local rival Tusculum. They also tied Milligan in the final meeting between the two rivals as Milligan dropped football after the season. One of the few bright spots of the year was the transfer of Hal Morrison from Tennessee, as he became a record-setting target over the next three seasons. This was the first Buccaneer football team to receive athletic scholarships after the players had gone on strike the previous year.

== Schedule ==
Date	Time	Opponent	Site	Result	Source
September 23	8:00 p.m.	at Tennessee Wesleyan*	Athens, TN	W 38–12	
September 30	8:00 p.m.	at Erskine*	Fairground Stadium; Greenwood, SC	L 6–12	
October 7	8:00 p.m.	at Western Carolina*	High school stadium; Waynesville, NC	L 6–13	
October 14		Maryville (TN)*	Johnson City, TN	W 33–14	
October 20		at Carson–Newman	Jefferson City, TN	L 6–25	
October 28		Middle Tennessee	State College Stadium; Johnson City, TN	L 6–19	
November 4	8:00 p.m.	Emory and Henry	State College Stadium; Johnson City, TN	L 0–19	
November 11		at Tusculum	Greeneville, TN	W 20–6	
November 18		Milligan	Johnson City, TN	T 6–6	
*Non-conference game; All times are in Eastern time
