= Daniel Geiser =

American sports coach (1917–2009)

Biographical details
- Born: April 26, 1917; Waynesboro, Pennsylvania, U.S.
- Died: November 8, 2009 (aged 92); Bridgewater, Virginia, U.S.
- Education: Juniata

Coaching career (HC unless noted)

Football
- 1949–1951: Bridgewater

Basketball
- 1946–1962: Bridgewater

Baseball
- 1946–1962: Bridgewater

Head coaching record
- Overall: 3–12 (football); 115–157 (basketball); 122–106 (baseball)

Accomplishments and honors

Championships
- 2 Virginia Little 8 baseball (1960, 1962)

Awards
- Bridgewater Hall of Fame (1998)

Daniel Singer Geiser Jr. (April 26, 1917 – November 8, 2009) was an American football, basketball and baseball coach at Bridgewater College in Bridgewater, Virginia.

In 1949, Geiser resurrected the Bridgewater Eagles football on a budget of $500USD after it had been dormant for 12 years due to World War II. From 1949 to 1951, amassed a record of 3–12.

He also coached the Bridgewater men's basketball team to 115 wins over several season as well as coaching the baseball team to a 122–108 overall record, including two Virginia Little Eight Conference championships in 1960 and 1962.

== Head coaching record ==
Year	Team	Overall	Conference	Standing	Bowl/playoffs
Bridgewater Eagles (Mason–Dixon Conference / Virginia Little Six Conference) (1949–1951)
1949	Bridgewater	1–3	/ 0–0	/ 3rd	
1950	Bridgewater	0–6	0–4 / 0–1	9th / 3rd	
1951	Bridgewater	1–3	1–2 / 0–2	4th / 4th	
Bridgewater:		3–12			
Total:		3–12			
