= 1950 East Carolina Pirates football team =

American college football season

1950 East Carolina Pirates football
- Conference: North State Conference
- Record: 7–3 (5–2 NSC)
- Head coach: Bill Dole (2nd season)
- Home stadium: College Stadium

1950 North State Conference football standings
	Conf.					Overall
Team	W		L		T	W		L		T
Appalachian State $	7	–	0	–	1	9	–	2	–	1
Elon	6	–	1	–	1	7	–	2	–	1
Lenoir Rhyne	6	–	2	–	0	8	–	2	–	0
East Carolina	5	–	2	–	0	7	–	3	–	0
Catawba	2	–	3	–	0	4	–	6	–	0
Guilford	2	–	5	–	0	4	–	5	–	0
Western Carolina	1	–	4	–	0	3	–	6	–	0
Atlantic Christian	0	–	5	–	0	2	–	7	–	0
High Point	0	–	7	–	0	1	–	8	–	0
$ – Conference champion

The 1950 East Carolina Pirates football team was an American football team that represented East Carolina Teachers College (now known as East Carolina University) as a member of the North State Conference during the 1950 college football season. In their second season under head coach Bill Dole, the team compiled a 7–3 record.

== Schedule ==
Date	Opponent	Site	Result	Attendance	Source
September 15	at The Apprentice School*	Newport News, VA	W 21–7	1,500	
September 23	at Lenoir Rhyne	Moretz Stadium; Hickory, NC	W 27–19		
September 30	Hampden–Sydney*	College Stadium; Greenville, NC	L 26–38		
October 7	at Elon	Elon, NC	L 16–26		
October 14	Western Carolina	College Stadium; Greenville, NC	W 36–6		
October 20	at Guilford	Greensboro Senior H.S. Stadium; Greensboro, NC	W 26–7		
October 28	Cherry Point Marines*	College Stadium; Greenville, NC	W 20–12		
November 4	at Appalachian State	College Field; Boone, NC	L 0–20		
November 11	High Point	College Stadium; Greenville, NC	W 26–0		
November 17	Atlantic Christian	College Stadium; Greenville, NC	W 54–7		
*Non-conference game
