= Skyhawk Park =

Baseball venue

Skyhawk Baseball Field
- Interactive map of Skyhawk Baseball Field
- Location: 3 Pat Head Summit Drive, Martin, Tennessee, USA
- Coordinates: 36.341989°N 88.870731°W
- Owner: University of Tennessee at Martin
- Operator: University of Tennessee at Martin
- Capacity: 500
- Surface: Natural grass
- Scoreboard: Electronic
- Field size: 330 feet (Left field); 365 feet (LCF); 385 feet (Center field); 365 feet (RCF); 330 feet (Right field)

Construction
- Built: 1974
- Renovated: 2005, 2008

Tenant
- UT Martin Skyhawks baseball (OVC) (1974–present)

Website
- https://utmsports.com/facilities/?id=9

Skyhawk Baseball Field is a baseball venue in Martin, Tennessee, United States. It is home to the UT Martin Skyhawks baseball team of the Division I Ohio Valley Conference. Built in 1974, the venue was renovated in 2005 and 2008. In 2005, a deck viewing area located down the first base line was added. In 2008, seating areas were improved and a new scoreboard was added. The field also features stadium lighting. The Skyhawk Baseball/Softball Building sits adjacent to Skyhawk Park and includes offices and clubhouses for both programs.

== See also ==
- List of NCAA Division I baseball venues
