= University of Oklahoma Westheimer Airport =

Airport in Oklahoma, United States of America

University of Oklahoma Max Westheimer Airport
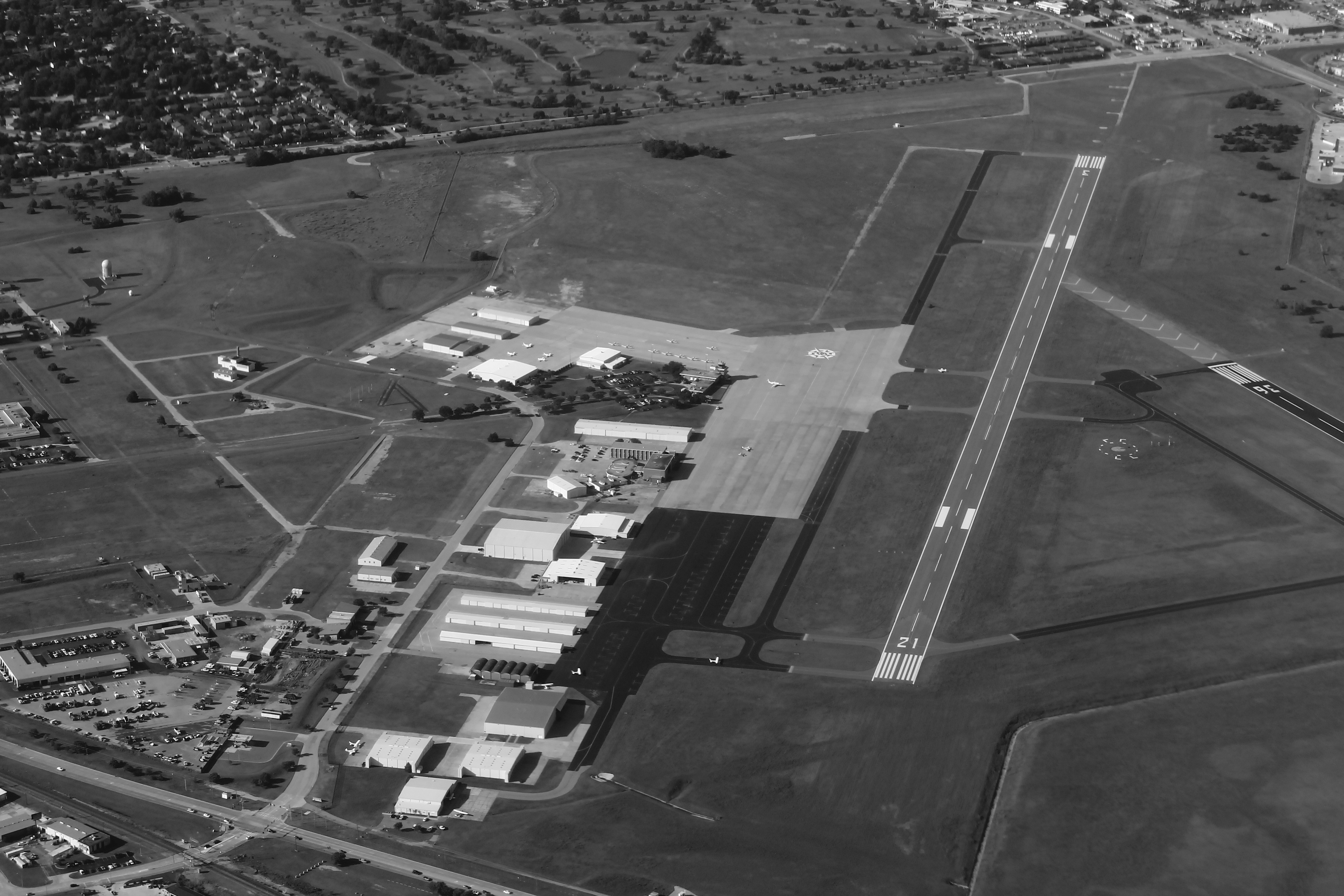
- Aerial view of the airport
- IATA: OUN; ICAO: KOUN; FAA LID: OUN

Summary
- Airport type: Public
- Owner: University of Oklahoma
- Serves: Norman, Oklahoma
- Elevation AMSL: 1,182 ft (360 m)
- Coordinates: 35°14′44″N 097°28′20″W

Map
- Location of airport in Oklahoma OUN (the United States)

Runways
Direction	Length		Surface
Direction	ft	m	Surface
18/36	5,199	1,585	Asphalt
3/21	4,748	1,447	Asphalt

Statistics
- Aircraft operations (2018): 48,733
- Based aircraft (2022): 107
- Source: Federal Aviation Administration

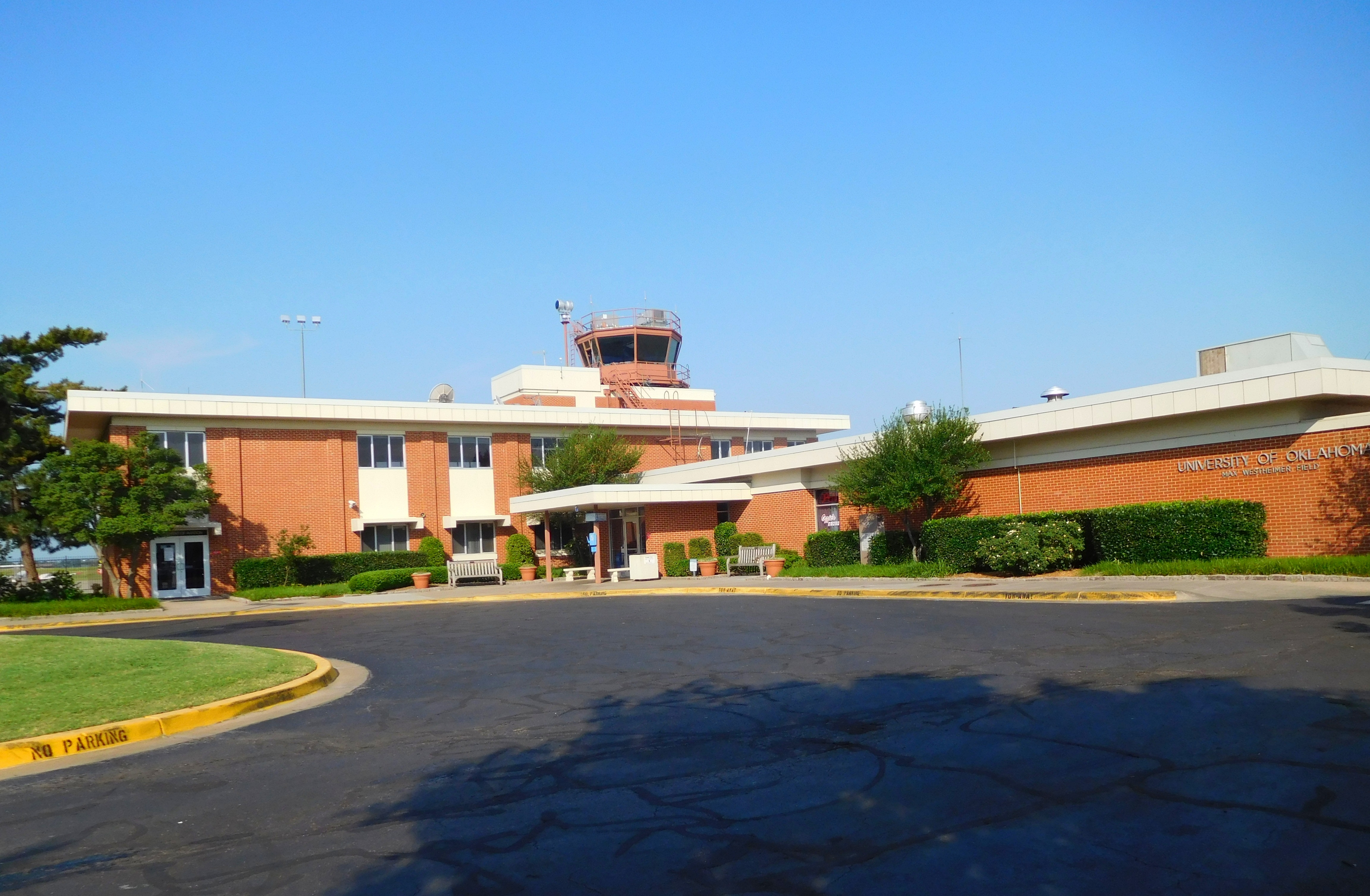
Terminal building in 2018

University of Oklahoma Westheimer Airport (IATA: OUN, ICAO: KOUN, FAA LID: OUN) (Max Westheimer Airport) is a public use airport in Norman, in Cleveland County, Oklahoma. It is owned by the University of Oklahoma. The National Plan of Integrated Airport Systems for 2021–2025 categorized it as a reliever airport.

== History ==
The airport was built as a civil airport on land donated by the Neustadt family in the name of World War I pilot Max Westheimer to the University of Oklahoma and land from the city of Norman, Oklahoma. It was taken over by the U.S. Navy in 1941 and expanded as a training field; it was then called the Naval Air Station Norman. It was transferred back to the University after the war.

== Facilities ==
The airport covers 727 acres (294 ha) at an elevation of 1,182 feet (360 m) above sea level. It has two asphalt runways: 18/36 is 5,199 by 100 feet (1,585 x 30 m) and 3/21 is 4,748 by 100 feet (1,447 x 30 m).

In the year ending January 1, 2018, the airport had 48,733 aircraft operations, an average of 134 per day: 97% general aviation, 2% military and 1% air taxi. In May 2022, there were 107 aircraft based at this airport: 80 single-engine, 16 multi-engine, 5 jet and 6 helicopter.

The Cleveland County Composite Squadron of Civil Air Patrol meets on Tuesday evenings in a hangar provided by The University of Oklahoma, east of the terminal.

== See also ==
- List of airports in Oklahoma
