= Volunteer State Athletic Conference =

The Volunteer State Athletic Conference (VSAC) was a college athletic conference which was predominantly for smaller colleges in the U.S. state of Tennessee.

== History ==
The VSAC was organized in the 1940s and dissolved at the end of the 1985 school year. Member schools were in the National Association of Intercollegiate Athletics (NAIA). Long-term members of the conference included the institutions now known as Belmont University, Bethel University, Bryan College, Carson–Newman University, Christian Brothers University, King University, Lee University, Lincoln Memorial University, Lipscomb University, Milligan University, Tusculum University, Tennessee Wesleyan University, and Union University, as well as the now-defunct Lambuth University.

=== Dissolution ===
The conference dissolved when the institutions in the eastern portion of the state seceded to form the Tennessee Valley Athletic Conference (TVAC). Those in the western part of the state formed in turn the Tennessee Collegiate Athletic Conference (TCAC). The Appalachian Athletic Conference is the direct successor of the TVAC, and was known as such until the mid-1990s when the addition of schools in Virginia, Kentucky, and North Carolina necessitated the name change. The TranSouth Athletic Conference, which operated from 1996 to 2013, is sometimes regarded as something of a successor to the TCAC. Sponsorship of football by the conference ended after the 1962 season, over two decades before the conference dissolved with regard to its other sports.

Other founding members of the VSAC included East Tennessee State University, Middle Tennessee State University, Austin Peay State University, and Tennessee Technological University; these schools all left the VSAC to join the Ohio Valley Conference. Out of those four, as of 2025, only Tennessee Tech remains in the OVC, while Austin Peay is in the United Athletic Conference, East Tennessee State is in the Southern Conference, and Middle Tennessee is in Conference USA.

== List of champions per sport ==
=== Football ===
- 1947 – Middle Tennessee
- 1948 – Austin Peay
- 1949 – Middle Tennessee
- 1950 – Middle Tennessee
- 1951 – Middle Tennessee
- 1952 – Middle Tennessee
- 1953 – Austin Peay and Middle Tennessee
- 1954 – East Tennessee State
- 1955 – Middle Tennessee
- 1956 – Middle Tennessee
- 1957 – Middle Tennessee
- 1958 – Unknown
- 1959 – Unknown
- 1960 – Tennessee–Martin
- 1961 – Austin Peay, Carson–Newman, and Tennessee–Martin
- 1962 – Tennessee–Martin

=== Basketball (tournament) ===
- 1948 – Lincoln Memorial
- 1949 – Austin Peay
- 1950 – Austin Peay
- 1951 – Lipscomb
- 1952 – Lipscomb
- 1953 – East Tennessee State
- 1954 – East Tennessee State
- 1955 – Middle Tennessee State
- 1956 – East Tennessee State
- 1957 – Middle Tennessee State
- 1958 – Austin Peay
- 1959 – Lincoln Memorial
- 1960 – Austin Peay
- 1961 – Lipscomb
- 1962 – Carson–Newman
- 1963 – Carson–Newman
- 1964 – Carson–Newman
- 1965 – Carson–Newman
- 1966 – Tusculum
- 1967 – Tennessee Wesleyan
- 1968 – Union (Tenn.)
- 1969 – Carson–Newman
- 1970 – Tennessee–Martin
- 1971 – Bethel (Tenn.)
- 1972 – Carson–Newman
- 1973 – Carson–Newman
- 1974 – LeMoyne–Owen
- 1975 – LeMoyne–Owen
- 1976 – Milligan
- 1977 – Lincoln Memorial
- 1978 – LeMoyne–Owen
- 1979 – Tusculum
- 1980 – Lambuth
- 1981 – Trevecca Nazarene
- 1982 – Bethel (Tenn.)
- 1983:
  - Eastern Division Champion – Lincoln Memorial
  - Western Division Champion – Belmont
- 1984:
  - Eastern Division Champion – Tennessee Wesleyan
  - Western Division Champion – Lipscomb
- 1985:
  - Eastern Division Champion – Carson–Newman
  - Western Division Champion – Christian Brothers

=== Cross country ===
- 1961 – Union (Tenn.)
- 1962 – Milligan
- 1963 – Milligan
- 1964 – Milligan
- 1965 – Milligan
- 1966 – Milligan
- 1967 – Milligan
- 1968 – Milligan
- 1969 – Carson–Newman

=== Track & field ===
- 1954 – East Tennessee State
- 1955 – East Tennessee State
- 1956 – East Tennessee State
- 1957 – Union (Tenn.)
- 1958 – Lipscomb
- 1959 – Union (Tenn.)
- 1960 – Austin Peay
- 1961 – Austin Peay
- 1962 – Union (Tenn.)
- 1963 – Union (Tenn.)
- 1964 – Union (Tenn.)
- 1965 – Union (Tenn.)
- 1966 – Milligan
- 1967 – Carson–Newman
- 1968 – Carson–Newman
- 1969 – Carson–Newman
- 1970 - Carson-Newman
- 1971 - Carson-Newman
- 1972 - Carson-Newman

=== Golf ===
- 1956 – Middle Tennessee State
- 1957 – Middle Tennessee State
- 1958 – Lipscomb
- 1959 – Union (Tenn.)
- 1960 – Belmont
- 1961 – Austin Peay
- 1962 – Austin Peay
- 1963 – Lipscomb
- 1964 – Milligan
- 1965 – Christian Brothers
- 1966 – Christian Brothers
- 1967 – Tennessee Wesleyan
- 1968 – Bethel (Tenn.)
- 1969 – Tennessee–Martin

== See also ==
- List of defunct college football conferences
