= Carson–Newman Eagles =

Athletic teams for Carson-Newman University

- University: Carson–Newman University
- Nickname: Eagles
- NCAA: Division II
- Conference: South Atlantic (primary)
- Athletic director: Matt Pope
- Location: Jefferson City, Tennessee
- Varsity teams: 21 (10 men's, 11 women's)
- Football stadium: Roy Harmon Field at Burke–Tarr Stadium
- Basketball arena: Holt Fieldhouse
- Baseball stadium: Silver Diamond Baseball Complex
- Softball stadium: Vickee Kazee-Hollifield Softball Complex
- Soccer stadium: McCown Field
- Colors: Navy and Orange
- Mascot: Talon
- Website: cneagles.com

Individual and relay NCAA champions
- 6

The Carson–Newman Eagles are the athletic teams that represent Carson–Newman University, located in Jefferson City, Tennessee, in NCAA Division II intercollegiate sports. The Eagles compete as members of the South Atlantic Conference for all 21 varsity sports.

Carson–Newman has been a member of the SAC since 1975, when the league was still part of the NAIA.

== History ==
The Eagles previously competed in the National Association of Intercollegiate Athletics (NAIA) as members of the Smoky Mountain Conference, the Volunteer State Athletic Conference (VCAC), and later its successor, the Tennessee Valley Athletic Conference (TVAC). The football team joined the SAC in 1975 when it was still a football-only conference known as SAC-8.

== Conference affiliations ==
NAIA

- Smoky Mountain Conference (1927–1951)
- Volunteer State Athletic Conference
- Tennessee Valley Athletic Conference

NCAA

- South Atlantic Conference (1975–present)

== National championships ==
=== Team ===
Sport	Association	Division	Year	Runner-up	Score
Baseball (1)	NAIA (1)	Single (1)	1965	Omaha	3–2
Football (5)	NAIA (5)	Division I (5)	1983	Mesa (Colo.)	36–28
Football (5)	NAIA (5)	Division I (5)	1984	Central Arkansas	19–19 (tie)
Football (5)	NAIA (5)	Division I (5)	1986	Cameron (Okla.)	17–0
Football (5)	NAIA (5)	Division I (5)	1988	Adams State (Colo.)	56–21
Football (5)	NAIA (5)	Division I (5)	1989	Emporia State (Kan.)	34–20

=== Individual ===
Sport	Association	Division	Year	Event	Name	Runner-up	Score
Track and Field (5)	NAIA (1)	DII (1)	1978	Long Jump	Larry Cooke		
Track and Field (5)	NCAA (4)	DII (4)	2018	High Jump	Tanner Stepp	Ian Duncan (Pitt State)	2.17m
Track and Field (5)	NCAA (4)	DII (4)	2023	200-meter dash	Makanakaishe Charamba	Dario Matau (Lenoir–Rhyne)	20.55s
Track and Field (5)	NCAA (4)	DII (4)	2023	100-meter dash	Makanakaishe Charamba	Isaac Botsio (West Texas A&M)	10.02s
Track and Field (5)	NCAA (4)	DII (4)	2025	60-meter dash	Andre Morrison	Winfred Porter (Catawba)	6.59s
Swimming (2)	NCAA (2)	DII (2)	2023	100 Yard Butterfly	Manon Compagner	Ann Carozza (West Chester)	52.45s
Swimming (2)	NCAA (2)	DII (2)	2023	100 Yard Freestyle	Manon Compagner	Kiara Pozvai (Henderson St.)	48.97s

== Facilities ==
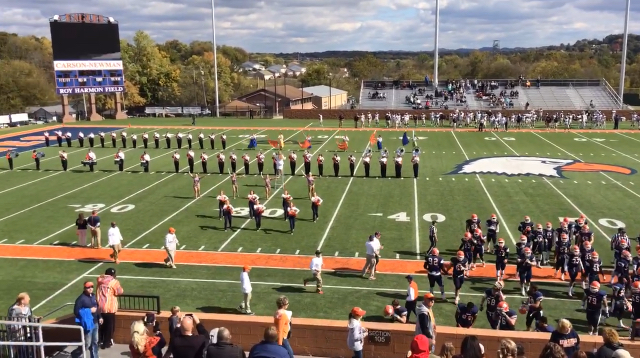
Burke-Tarr's field in 2016

The college's athletic facilities include Roy Harmon Field at Burke–Tarr Stadium, the Ken Sparks Athletic Complex, McCown Soccer Field, the Silver Diamond Baseball Complex, six tennis courts, a softball complex, swimming pool, and Holt Fieldhouse.

== Sports sponsored ==
=== List of teams ===
Men's sports	Women's sports
Baseball	Basketball
Basketball	Cross country
Cross country	Golf
Football	Soccer
Golf	Softball
Soccer	Swimming
Swimming	Tennis
Tennis	Track and field^{†}
Track and field^{†}	Volleyball
	Beach Volleyball
† – Track and field includes both indoor and outdoor.

=== Baseball ===
In 2007, the C-N baseball team won the South Atlantic Conference Tournament after defeating Tusculum College, who had won more than 20 games in a row, twice in one day. The team traveled to Tampa, Florida, to compete in the NCAA Division II Regional Tournament. The baseball team returned to Tampa for the NCAA Regional Tournament in 2008 after receiving an at-large bid and finished third, again eliminating Tusculum College.

=== Football ===
In 2009, the C-N football team won the NCAA Division II South Regional Championship in Florence, Alabama to advance to the Final Four. Football coach Ken Sparks, a graduate of the school, coached the team from 1980 to 2016 and ranked fourth in most wins among NCAA coaches upon his retirement.

In 2023, Ashley Ingram was hired as head coach. Ingram was an assistant coach at Navy for 16 years. In his first season, he guided the Eagles to a 9-3 record, culminating in an NCAA Playoff berth, losing in the first round to Miles.

=== Men's soccer ===
The men's soccer team appeared in the final game of the 2013 NCAA Division II Men's Soccer Championship. They were defeated 2–1 by Southern New Hampshire University.

=== Men's swimming ===
Robert Griswold competed for the men's swimming team.
