= 1950 Appalachian State Mountaineers football team =

American college football season

1950 Appalachian State Mountaineers football

NSC champion

Burley Bowl, L 6–26 vs. Emory and Henry Pythian Bowl, L 26–28 vs. West Liberty
- Conference: North State Conference
- Record: 9–2–1 (7–0–1 NSC)
- Head coach: E. C. Duggins (4th season)
- Home stadium: College Field

1950 North State Conference football standings
	Conf.					Overall
Team	W		L		T	W		L		T
Appalachian State $	7	–	0	–	1	9	–	2	–	1
Elon	6	–	1	–	1	7	–	2	–	1
Lenoir Rhyne	6	–	2	–	0	8	–	2	–	0
East Carolina	5	–	2	–	0	7	–	3	–	0
Catawba	2	–	3	–	0	4	–	6	–	0
Guilford	2	–	5	–	0	4	–	5	–	0
Western Carolina	1	–	4	–	0	3	–	6	–	0
Atlantic Christian	0	–	5	–	0	2	–	7	–	0
High Point	0	–	7	–	0	1	–	8	–	0
$ – Conference champion

The 1950 Appalachian State Mountaineers football team was an American football team that represented Appalachian State Teachers College (now known as Appalachian State University) as a member of the North State Conference during the 1950 college football season. In their fourth year under head coach E. C. Duggins, the Mountaineers compiled an overall record of 9–2–1, with a mark of 7–0–1 in conference play, and finished as NSC champion. State concluded their season with a losses to Emory and Henry at the Burley Bowl and against West Liberty at the Pythian Bowl.

== Schedule ==
Date	Time	Opponent	Site	Result	Attendance	Source
September 16		vs. Guilford	Bowman Gray Stadium; Winston-Salem, NC	W 22–2		
September 23		vs. Western Carolina	Memorial Stadium; Asheville, NC (rivalry)	W 13–6	6,000	
September 30		Elon	College Field; Boone, NC	T 14–14		
October 7		at Lenoir Rhyne	Moretz Stadium; Hickory, NC	W 20–18		
October 14		vs. Catawba	Bowman Gray Stadium; Winston-Salem, NC	W 9–7		
October 21		High Point	College Field; Boone, NC	W 35–0		
October 28		at Tampa*	Phillips Field; Tampa, FL	W 36–19	8,000	
November 4		East Carolina	College Field; Boone, NC	W 20–0		
November 9		at Presbyterian*	Bailey Stadium; Clinton, SC	W 34–7	2,500	
November 11		at Atlantic Christian	Wilson, NC	W 34–7		
November 23	2:15 p.m.	vs. Emory and Henry*	Memorial Stadium; Johnson City, TN (Burley Bowl)	L 6–26	12,000	
December 9		vs. West Liberty*	Shuford Stadium; Salisbury, NC (Pythian Bowl)	L 26–28		
*Non-conference game; All times are in Eastern time
