= Conley Snidow =

American sports coach and administrator (1916–2007)

Biographical details
- Born: April 26, 1916; Princeton, West Virginia, U.S.
- Died: October 6, 2007 (aged 91); Midlothian, Virginia, U.S.

Playing career

Football
- 1935–1937: Roanoke

Coaching career (HC unless noted)

Football
- ?–1947: Tazewell HS (VA)
- 1948–1952: Emory and Henry
- 1953–1966: Wofford

Basketball
- 1948–1953: Emory and Henry

Administrative career (AD unless noted)
- 1953–1971: Wofford

Head coaching record
- Overall: 117–71–5 (college football); 70–51 (college basketball)
- Bowls: 2–3

Accomplishments and honors

Championships
- Football; 4 Smoky Mountain (1949–1952); 3 Virginia Little Six (1949–1951); 7 South Carolina Little Three (1954, 1956–1957, 1961–1964)

Conley Trigg Snidow Jr. (April 26, 1916 – October 6, 2007) was an American football and basketball coach and college athletics administrator. He served as the head football coach at Emory and Henry College from 1948 to 1952 and at Wofford College from 1953 to 1966, compiling a career college football coaching record of 117–71–5. Snidow was the head basketball coach at Emory and Henry from 1948 to 1953, tallying a mark of 70–51. He served as the athletic director at Wofford from 1953 to 1971. Snidow played college football at Roanoke College from 1935 to 1937.

Snidow was born on April 26, 1916, in Princeton, West Virginia. He died on October 6, 2007, in Midlothian, Virginia.

== Head coaching record ==
=== College football ===
Year	Team	Overall	Conference	Standing	Bowl/playoffs
Emory and Henry Wasps (Smoky Mountain Conference) (1948)
1948	Emory and Henry	2–8	1–1	2nd	
Emory and Henry Wasps (Smoky Mountain Conference / Virginia Little Six Conference) (1949–1953)
1949	Emory and Henry	11–1	4–0 / 2–0	1st / 1st	W Burley, L Tangerine
1950	Emory and Henry	10–2	4–0 / 2–0	1st / 1st	W Burley, L Tangerine
1951	Emory and Henry	9–0–1	2–0 / 2–0	1st / 1st	
1952	Emory and Henry	8–2	1–0 / 1–1	1st / 2nd	L Burley
Emory and Henry:		40–13–1	19–2		
Wofford Terriers (South Carolina Little Three) (1953–1964)
1953	Wofford	6–4–1	0–2	3rd	
1954	Wofford	8–2	2–0	1st	
1955	Wofford	7–4	1–1	2nd	
1956	Wofford	7–3	2–0	1st	
1957	Wofford	8–2	2–0	1st	
1958	Wofford	3–7	0–2	3rd	
1959	Wofford	5–5	0–2	3rd	
1960	Wofford	5–5	1–1	2nd	
1961	Wofford	5–4–2	2–0	1st	
1962	Wofford	2–8	1–1	T–1st	
1963	Wofford	4–6	2–0	1st	
1964	Wofford	6–3	2–0	1st	
Wofford Terriers (NAIA independent) (1965–1966)
1965	Wofford	5–4			
1966	Wofford	6–3–1			
Wofford:		77–58–4	15–9		
Total:		117–71–5			
National championship Conference title Conference division title or championship game berth
