= Skyhawk Fieldhouse =

Multi-purpose arena in Martin, Tennessee

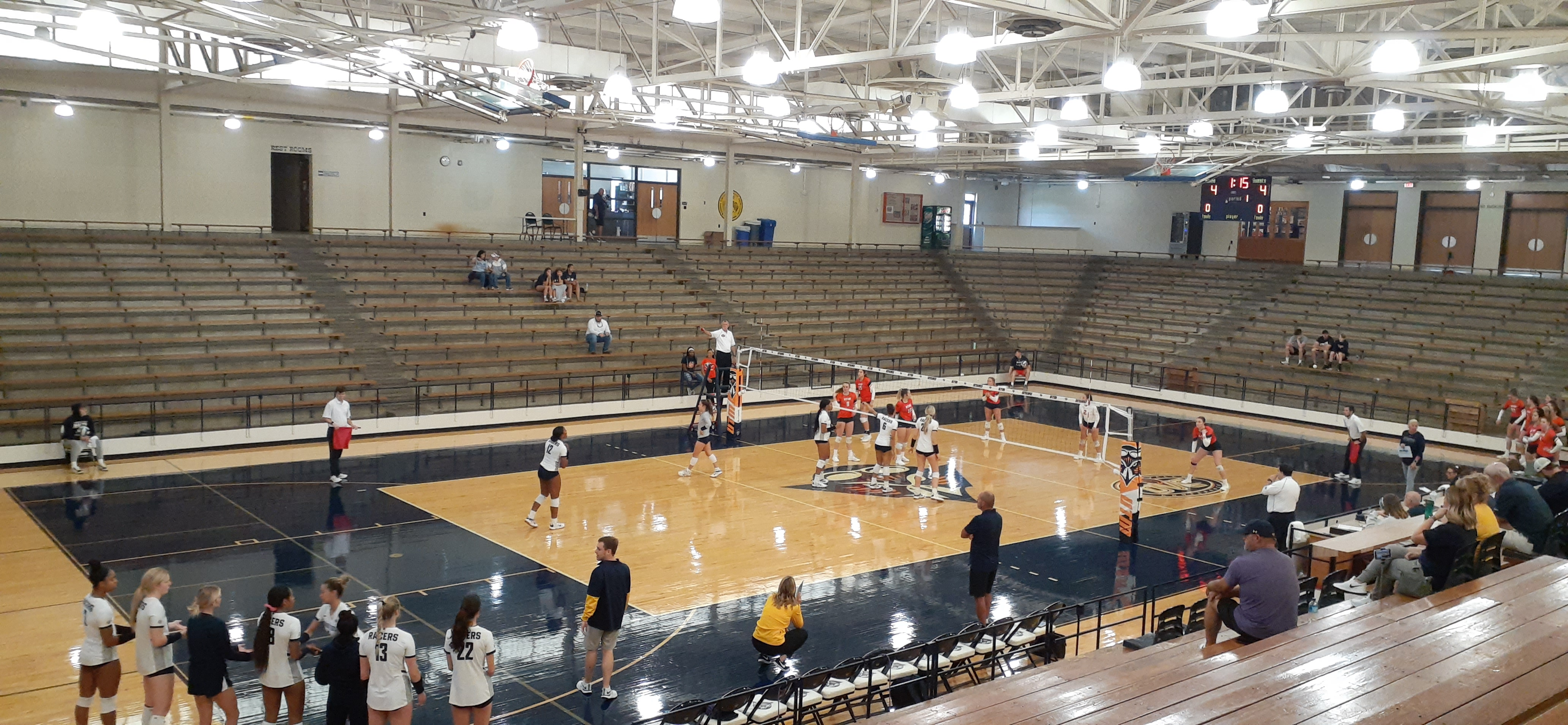
- Interactive map of Skyhawk Fieldhouse
- Former names: Physical Education/Convocation Center
- Location: 95 Mount Pelia Road, Martin, Tennessee, USA
- Coordinates: 36.343648°N 88.867185°W
- Owner: University of Tennessee at Martin
- Operator: University of Tennessee at Martin
- Capacity: 3,000
- Scoreboard: Electronic

Construction
- Built: 1969
- Renovated: 2014

Tenant
- UT Martin Skyhawks volleyball (OVC) (1969–present)

Website
- https://utmsports.com/facilities/?id=11

Skyhawk Fieldhouse is a 3,000-seat multi-purpose arena that is adjacent to the Elam Center that is the home court for the Skyhawks women's volleyball team.

Skyhawk Fieldhouse is located adjacent to the Kathleen and Tom Elam Center on the campus at the corner of University Street and Mt. Pelia Road.

== History ==
Since 1969, the University of Tennessee at Martin volleyball team has called the Skyhawk Fieldhouse its home. With a capacity of 3,000, Skyhawk Fieldhouse is also home to the volleyball team’s locker room, coaches’ suite, athletic training facilities and sports information offices.

The Fieldhouse underwent a major facelift in the summer of 2014, as a brand new playing court was installed with a large Skyhawk head logo placed at midcourt. That followed an overhaul in the summer of 2011 that featured a large “Skyhawk Volleyball” screenprint was placed on the west wall. A total of 115 temporary plastic seats were also installed in the south bleachers, behind the bench areas. The volleyball locker room also went through a drastic renovation in the summer of 2017, completed just in time for the start of the season.

Before construction of the neighboring Kathleen and Tom Elam Center in 1976, Skyhawk Fieldhouse was also home to the UT Martin men’s and women’s basketball teams. Now Skyhawk Fieldhouse is also home to many of the university’s largest and most well-known events that surround Homecoming and Greek Week. The UT Martin volleyball team hosted the First State Skyhawk Invitational in three recent seasons (2011, 2012, 2014), which consisted of four teams playing in a two-day tournament.

UT Martin hosted the 2002 Ohio Valley Conference Tournament at Skyhawk Fieldhouse and claimed its first tournament championship and automatic bid to the NCAA tournament, with a 3-0 title match win over Southeast Missouri. The 2002 OVC Tournament also produced the largest crowd at Skyhawk Fieldhouse when 1,172 fans watched UT Martin defeat rival Murray State 3-2 in the semifinals.
