= Ryan Jenkins (baseball) =

American baseball coach (born 1987)

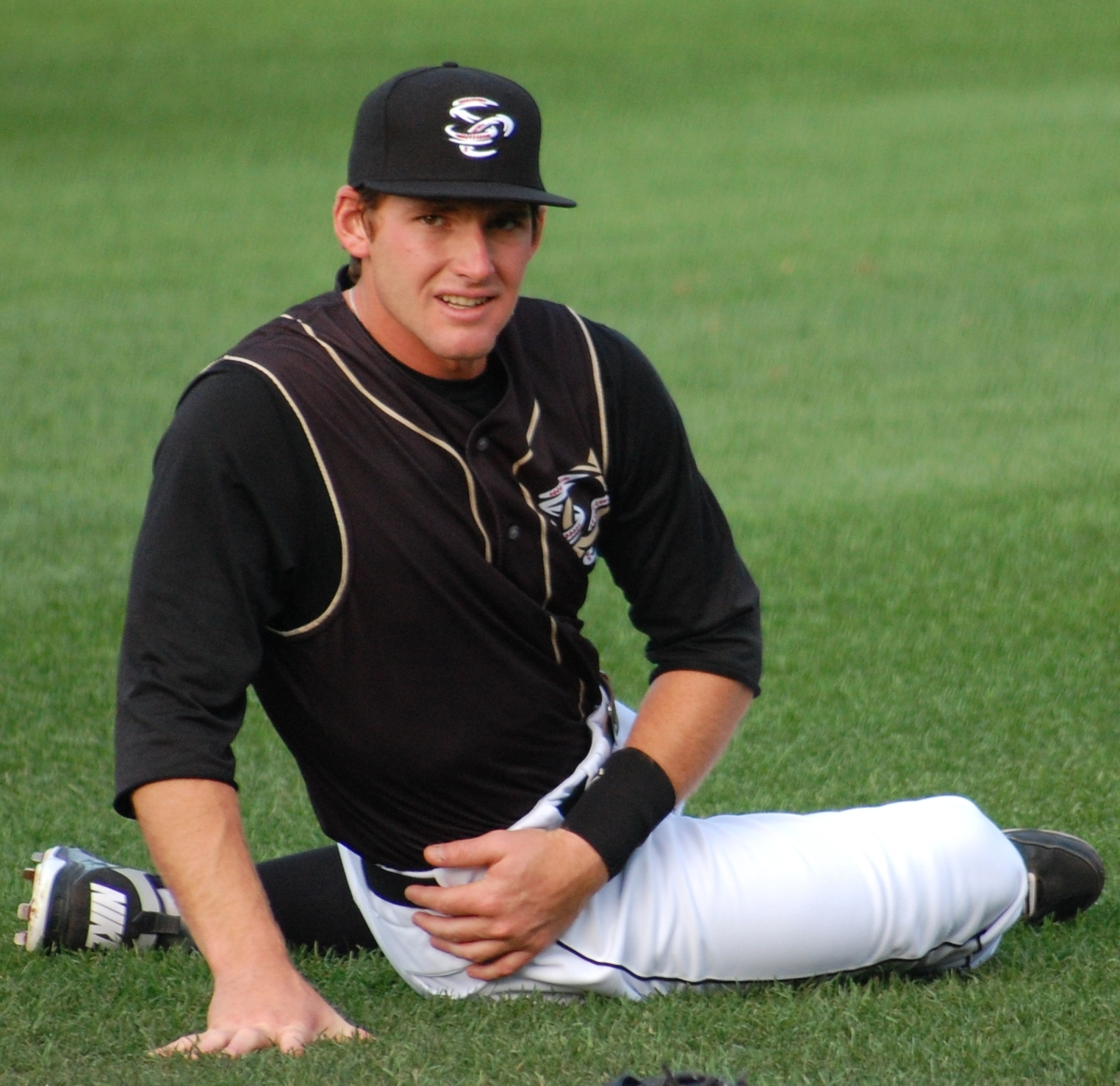
- Jenkins with the Omaha Storm Chasers in 2011

Current position
- Title: Head coach
- Team: UT Martin
- Conference: Ohio Valley
- Record: 134–248

Biographical details
- Born: January 26, 1987 (age 39); Millbrook, Alabama, U.S.

Playing career
- 2006–2010: Auburn
- 2010: Burlington Royals
- 2011: Kane County Cougars
- 2011: Arizona League Royals
- 2011: Idaho Falls Chukars
- 2012: Northwest Arkansas Naturals
- Position: Catcher

Coaching career (HC unless noted)
- 2014: Auburn (GA)
- 2017: College of Charleston (asst.)
- 2018–present: UT Martin

Head coaching record
- Overall: 134–248
- Tournaments: NCAA: 0–0

Phillip Ryan Jenkins (January 26, 1987) is an American college baseball coach and former catcher. Jenkins is the head coach of the UT Martin Skyhawks baseball team.

== Amateur career ==
Jenkins attended Stanhope Elmore High School in Millbrook, Alabama. As a junior, Jenkins was named 5A All-State as a utility player. Jenkins then committed to Auburn University, where he was a member of the Auburn Tigers baseball team.

== Professional career ==
Jenkins was drafted in the 17th round of the 2010 Major League Baseball draft by the Kansas City Royals. Jenkins played parts of three seasons in Kansas City's farm system. Although he was assigned to the Triple-A Omaha Storm Chasers for a week in August 2011, Jenkins never played a game above Double-A.

== Coaching career ==
On August 24, 2016, Jenkins was named an assistant coach at the College of Charleston. On December 11, 2017, Jenkins was named the interim head coach of the Skyhawks.

== Head coaching record ==
Statistics overview
Season	Team	Overall	Conference	Standing	Postseason
UT Martin Skyhawks (Ohio Valley Conference) (2018–present)
2018	UT Martin	11–40	7–22	10th	
2019	UT Martin	25–31	12–18	8th	Ohio Valley Tournament
2020	UT Martin	5–11	1–2		Season canceled due to COVID-19
2021	UT Martin	19–29	10–17	11th	
2022	UT Martin	11–34	4–20	9th	
2023	UT Martin	22–34	14–10	T-3rd	Ohio Valley Tournament
2024	UT Martin	21–35	12–15	8th	Ohio Valley Tournament
2025	UT Martin	20–34	11–14	7th	Ohio Valley Tournament
UT Martin:		134–248	71–118		
Total:		134–248			
National champion Postseason invitational champion Conference regular season champion Conference regular season and conference tournament champion Division regular season champion Division regular season and conference tournament champion Conference tournament champion

== See also ==
- List of current NCAA Division I baseball coaches
