= 1950 Middle Tennessee Blue Raiders football team =

American college football season

1950 Middle Tennessee Blue Raiders football

VSAC champion
- Conference: Volunteer State Athletic Conference
- Record: 9–2 (4–0 VSAC)
- Head coach: Charles M. Murphy (4th season)
- Captains: J. McCoy; F. Atchley
- Home stadium: Horace Jones Field

1950 Volunteer State Athletic Conference football standings
	Conf.					Overall
Team	W		L		T	W		L		T
Middle Tennessee $	4	–	0	–	0	9	–	2	–	0
Milligan	1	–	1	–	1	3	–	4	–	2
Austin Peay	1	–	2	–	0	5	–	2	–	1
East Tennessee State	0	–	1	–	1	3	–	5	–	1
Union (TN)	0	–	2	–	0	2	–	8	–	0
$ – Conference champion

The 1950 Middle Tennessee Blue Raiders football team represented the Middle Tennessee State College—now known as Middle Tennessee State University—as a member of the Volunteer State Athletic Conference (VSAC) during the 1950 college football season. Led by fourth-year head coach Charles M. Murphy, the Blue Raiders compiled a record an overall record of 9–2 with a mark of 4–0 in conference play, winning the VSAC title. The team's captains were J. McCoy and F. Atchley.

== Schedule ==
Date	Opponent	Site	Result	Attendance	Source
September 16	at Millington Navy*	Millington, TN	W 33–0		
September 23	at Vanderbilt*	Dudley Field; Nashville, TN	L 0–47	18,000	
September 30	Milligan	Horace Jones Field; Murfreesboro, TN	W 48–6		
October 7	at Union (TN)	Rothrock Field; Jackson, TN	W 45–0		
October 13	Austin Peay	Horace Jones Field; Murfreesboro, TN	W 34–14		
October 20	Morehead State*	Horace Jones Field; Murfreesboro, TN	L 7–31		
October 28	at East Tennessee State	State College Stadium; Johnson City, TN	W 21–6		
November 4	Florence State*	Horace Jones Field; Murfreesboro, TN	W 26–6		
November 11	Murray State*	Horace Jones Field; Murfreesboro, TN	W 34–14		
November 18	at Lamar Tech*	Greenie Stadium; Beaumont, TX	W 27–0		
November 30	at Tennessee Tech*	Overhill Field; Cookeville, TN	W 28–7		
*Non-conference game
