= 1949 Appalachian State Mountaineers football team =

American college football season

1949 Appalachian State Mountaineers football

Pythian Bowl, W 21–7 vs. Catawba
- Conference: North State Conference
- Record: 9–3 (6–2 NSC)
- Head coach: E. C. Duggins (3rd season)
- Home stadium: College Field

1949 North State Conference football standings
	Conf.					Overall
Team	W		L		T	W		L		T
Western Carolina $	4	–	0	–	0	8	–	3	–	0
Appalachian State	6	–	2	–	0	8	–	3	–	0
Elon	5	–	2	–	0	8	–	2	–	0
Catawba	4	–	2	–	0	5	–	5	–	0
Lenoir Rhyne	5	–	3	–	0	7	–	3	–	0
Guilford	2	–	3	–	1	4	–	5	–	1
East Carolina	1	–	4	–	1	4	–	5	–	1
Atlantic Christian	0	–	5	–	2	1	–	7	–	2
High Point	0	–	6	–	0	0	–	9	–	0
$ – Conference champion

The 1949 Appalachian State Mountaineers football team was an American football team that represented Appalachian State Teachers College (now known as Appalachian State University) as a member of the North State Conference during the 1949 college football season. In their third year under head coach E. C. Duggins, the Mountaineers compiled an overall record of 9–3, with a mark of 6–2 in conference play, and finished second in the NSC. State concluded their season with a victory over Catawba at the Pythian Bowl.

== Schedule ==
Date	Opponent	Site	Result	Attendance	Source
September 10	Apprentice*	College Field; Boone, NC	W 35–0		
September 17	vs. Guilford	Bowman Gray Stadium; Winston-Salem, NC	L 12–13	6,000	
September 24	Western Carolina	College Field; Boone, NC (rivalry)	L 6–13		
September 30	at Elon	Burlington Municipal Stadium; Burlington, NC	W 14–0		
October 8	Lenoir Rhyne	College Field; Boone, NC	W 19–6	6,000	
October 15	vs. Catawba	Bowman Gray Stadium; Winston-Salem, NC	W 12–6	5,000	
October 21	at High Point	Albion Millis Stadium; High Point, NC	W 21–7		
October 29	at Newberry*	Setzler Field; Newberry, SC	W 41–6	3,000	
November 5	at East Carolina	College Stadium; Greenville, NC	W 35–18		
November 12	Atlantic Christian	College Field; Boone, NC	W 34–0	2,000	
November 19	at Morris Harvey*	Laidley Field; Charleston, WV	L 12–21	3,000	
December 10	vs. Catawba	Shuford Stadium; Salisbury, NC (Pythian Bowl)	W 21–7	2,000	
*Non-conference game
