= 1951 Tangerine Bowl =

American college football game

Emory and Henry Wasps	Morris Harvey Golden Eagles
(10–1)	(9–0)
Smoky Mountain Conference	West Virginia Intercollegiate; Athletic Conference
14	35
Head coach: Conley Snidow	Head coach: Eddie King
	1	2	3	4	Total
Emory and Henry	7	0	7	0	14
Morris Harvey	0	14	14	7	35
- Date: January 1, 1951
- Season: 1950
- Stadium: Tangerine Bowl
- Location: Orlando, Florida
- MVP: Pete Anania, Morris Harvey (back); Charles Hubbard, Morris Harvey (lineman)
- Attendance: 10,000
- Payout: US$5000 per school

The 1951 Tangerine Bowl was an American college football bowl game played following the 1950 season, on January 1, 1951, at the Tangerine Bowl stadium in Orlando, Florida. The game featured the Emory and Henry Wasps and the Morris Harvey Golden Eagles (now the Charleston Golden Eagles).

== Background ==
The Wasps were champions of the Smoky Mountain Conference, compiled a regular-season record of 9–1, and won the Burley Bowl over the Appalachian State Mountaineers on Thanksgiving Day (November 23, 1950). The Golden Eagles came into the game having posted a regular-season record of 9–0.

== Game summary ==
The only scoring in the first quarter was a touchdown by Emory and Henry, giving them a 7–0 lead. In the second quarter, Morris Harvey answered with two touchdowns, and had a 14–7 lead at halftime. Each team equaled their first-half scoring during the third quarter, to see Morris Harvey take a 28–14 lead. In the fourth quarter, Morris Harvey added one more touchdown, giving them a 35–14 victory. Morris Harvey quarterback Pete Anania threw four touchdown passes; three of them were caught by end Charles Hubbard. Anania and Hubbard were named the game's outstanding back and lineman, respectively.
