= 1949 East Carolina Pirates football team =

American college football season

1949 East Carolina Pirates football
- Conference: North State Conference
- Record: 4–5–1 (1–4–1 NSC)
- Head coach: Bill Dole (1st season)
- Home stadium: College Stadium

1949 North State Conference football standings
	Conf.					Overall
Team	W		L		T	W		L		T
Western Carolina $	4	–	0	–	0	8	–	3	–	0
Appalachian State	6	–	2	–	0	8	–	3	–	0
Elon	5	–	2	–	0	8	–	2	–	0
Catawba	4	–	2	–	0	5	–	5	–	0
Lenoir Rhyne	5	–	3	–	0	7	–	3	–	0
Guilford	2	–	3	–	1	4	–	5	–	1
East Carolina	1	–	4	–	1	4	–	5	–	1
Atlantic Christian	0	–	5	–	2	1	–	7	–	2
High Point	0	–	6	–	0	0	–	9	–	0
$ – Conference champion

The 1949 East Carolina Pirates football team was an American football team that represented East Carolina Teachers College (now known as East Carolina University) as a member of the North State Conference during the 1949 college football season. In their first season under head coach Bill Dole, the team compiled a 4–5–1 record.

== Schedule ==
Date	Opponent	Site	Result	Attendance	Source
September 15	Cherry Point Marines*	College Stadium; Greenville, NC	W 24–0		
September 24	Lenoir Rhyne	College Stadium; Greenville, NC	L 20–21		
October 1	at Hampden–Sydney*	Hampden Sydney, VA	L 7–20		
October 8	Elon	College Stadium; Greenville, NC	L 7–33		
October 15	vs. Western Carolina	Canton Memorial Stadium; Canton, NC	L 6–19	4,500	
October 21	at The Apprentice School*	Apprentice Field; Newport News, VA	W 26–21		
October 28	MCAS Edenton*	College Stadium; Greenville, NC	W 67–0		
November 5	Appalachian State	College Stadium; Greenville, NC	L 18–35		
November 12	at High Point	High Point, NC	T 26–26		
November 19	at Atlantic Christian	Wilson, NC	W 6–2		
*Non-conference game
