= 1950 Morris Harvey Golden Eagles football team =

American college football season

1950 Morris Harvey Golden Eagles football

WVIAC champion Tangerine Bowl champion

Tangerine Bowl, W 35–14 vs. Emory and Henry
- Conference: West Virginia Intercollegiate Athletic Conference
- Record: 10–0 (5–0 WVIAC)
- Head coach: Eddie King (5th season)

1950 West Virginia Intercollegiate Athletic Conference football standings
	Conf.					Overall
Team	W		L		T	W		L		T
Morris Harvey +	5	–	0	–	0	10	–	0	–	0
West Liberty State +	5	–	0	–	0	9	–	0	–	0
Potomac State +	4	–	0	–	0	6	–	0	–	0
Shepherd	3	–	2	–	1	4	–	4	–	1
West Virginia Tech	3	–	2	–	1	0	–	6	–	3
Fairmont State	4	–	3	–	0	4	–	4	–	0
Davis & Elkins	4	–	4	–	0	5	–	5	–	0
Salem	3	–	4	–	0	3	–	5	–	0
Glenville State	3	–	5	–	0	3	–	5	–	0
West Virginia Wesleyan	1	–	7	–	0	1	–	8	–	0
Concord	0	–	6	–	0	1	–	8	–	0
Bethany (WV) *	0	–	2	–	0	1	–	6	–	1
+ – Conference co-champions; * – Did not qualify for conference standings Ties did not count in conference standings.

The 1950 Morris Harvey Golden Eagles football team represented the Morris Harvey College—now known as the University of Charleston as a member of the West Virginia Intercollegiate Athletic Conference (WVIAC) during the 1950 college football season. Led by fifth-year head coach Eddie King, the Golden Eagles compiled a perfect overall record of 10–0 with a mark of 5–0 in conference, sharing the WVIAC title with Potomac State and West Liberty State. Morris Harvey was invited to the Tangerine Bowl, where the Golden Eagles defeated Emory and Henry.

== Schedule ==
Date	Time	Opponent	Site	Result	Attendance	Source
September 22	8:00 p.m.	Kent State*	Charleston, WV	W 7–0		
September 30		at West Virginia Wesleyan	Buckhannon, WV	W 68–6		
October 7		vs. Concord	Bluefield, WV	W 27–0		
October 14		Evansville*	Charleston, WV	W 47–13		
October 21		West Virginia Tech	Charleston, WV	W 61–13	10,000	
October 28		Shepherd^{†}	Charleston, WV	W 48–12	4,000	
November 4		Georgetown (KY)*	Charleston, WV	W 41–20		
November 10		at Gannon*	Erie, PA	W 35–13	3,000	
November 18		Davis & Elkins	Charleston, WV	W 26–6		
January 1	8:00 p.m.	vs. Emory and Henry*	Tangerine Bowl; Orlando, FL (Tangerine Bowl)	W 35–14	10,000	
*Non-conference game; ^{†}Homecoming; All times are in Eastern time
