= Bill Dole =

American football coach

- Dole pictured in The Tecoan 1950, ECU yearbook

Biographical details
- Born: July 5, 1909; Galesburg, Michigan, U.S.
- Died: February 7, 1966 (aged 56); Newton, North Carolina, U.S.

Coaching career (HC unless noted)
- ?: Beaver HS (WV)
- 1946–1948: Fayetteville HS (NC)
- 1949–1951: East Carolina
- 1952–1964: Davidson

Head coaching record
- Overall: 58–80–5 (college)

William Edward Dole Sr. (July 5, 1909 – February 7, 1966) was an American football coach. He served as the head football coach at East Carolina University from 1949 to 1951 and Davidson College from 1952 to 1964, compiling a career college football coaching record of 58–80–5.

== Life ==
Dole was born July 5, 1909, in Galesburg, Michigan, the son of Clinton Howard Dole and his wife, Alma Lovica (Eaton) Dole. His parents had married on September 11, 1906, and divorced on February 16, 1918.

His father would remarry, divorce again, remarry again, and divorce again. From his father's third marriage, Dole has a step-sister, Kay Dole McConnell Warnicke (1932–2007).

Through his father, he is a descendant of Louis DuBois, Louis Bevier, Simon LeFevre, Andries LeFevre, and Christian Deyo, all patentees, or founders, of New Paltz, New York. He also descends from the DeWitt family, making him a distant cousin of former New York State Governor DeWitt Clinton.

He married Helen Elizabeth Williams (1912–1964), a native of Beckley, West Virginia, on August 18, 1934, in Manhattan, New York. They had one son, William Edward Dole Jr. (1942–2011).

Dole died in his car at the age of 56, near his apartment in Newton, North Carolina, due to a heart attack on February 7, 1966.

== Head coaching record ==
=== College ===
Year	Team	Overall	Conference	Standing	Bowl/playoffs
East Carolina Pirates (North State Conference) (1949–1951)
1949	East Carolina	4–5–1	1–4–1	7th	
1950	East Carolina	7–3	5–2	4th	
1951	East Carolina	4–6	1–4	T–5th	
East Carolina:		15–14–1	7–10–1		
Davidson Wildcats (Southern Conference) (1952–1964)
1952	Davidson	2–7	1–6	14th	
1953	Davidson	0–9	0–5	10th	
1954	Davidson	6–3	2–1	4th	
1955	Davidson	5–4	3–2	T–3rd	
1956	Davidson	5–3–1	2–2–1	T–4th	
1957	Davidson	5–3	1–3	T–7th	
1958	Davidson	5–4	2–3	T–6th	
1959	Davidson	1–8	0–5	T–8th	
1960	Davidson	3–5	1–3	7th	
1961	Davidson	4–4	1–4	8th	
1962	Davidson	3–5–1	0–4–1	9th	
1963	Davidson	1–5–2	0–4–1	9th	
1964	Davidson	3–6	1–3	7th	
Davidson:		43–66–4	14–45–3		
Total:		58–80–5			
