= 1950 Tangerine Bowl =

American college football game

Saint Vincent Bearcats	Emory and Henry Wasps
(9–0)	(11–0)
	Smoky Mountain Conference
7	6
Head coach: Al DeLuca	Head coach: Conley Snidow
	1	2	3	4	Total
Saint Vincent	0	7	0	0	7
Emory and Henry	0	6	0	0	6
- Date: January 2, 1950
- Season: 1949
- Stadium: Tangerine Bowl
- Location: Orlando, Florida
- MVP: Don Henigin, Saint Vincent; Chick Davis, Emory and Henry
- Favorite: Emory and Henry by 6
- Referee: L.L. McMasters
- Attendance: 9,500

The 1950 Tangerine Bowl was an American college football bowl game played after the 1949 season, on January 2, 1950, at the Tangerine Bowl stadium in Orlando, Florida. The game was the fourth annual Tangerine Bowl, now known as the Citrus Bowl, and saw the Saint Vincent defeat the Emory and Henry, 7–6. Both teams had entered the bowl undefeated. This game was the second Tangerine Bowl where MVP honors were awarded; they were given to fullback Don Henigin of Saint Vincent and quarterback Chick Davis of Emory and Henry.

== Game summary ==
The only scoring was two touchdowns in the second quarter. Saint Vincent scored first, and converted their extra point for a 7–0 lead. Emory and Henry scored a touchdown as well, but missed the extra point, leaving the score 7–6 at halftime. After a scoreless second half, the missed extra point proved to be the margin of victory.

== Scoring summary ==
Scoring summary

Quarter	Time	Drive			Team	Scoring information	Score	
Quarter	Time	Plays	Yards	TOP	Team	Scoring information	StV	E&H
2		5	17		StV	Don Henigin 1-yard touchdown run, Jack Heimbeucher kick good	7	0
2		11	54		E&H	Bob Howard 4-yard touchdown reception from Chick Davis, Bill Pippin kick no good	7	6
"TOP" = time of possession. For other American football terms, see Glossary of American football.							7	6

== Statistics ==
Statistics	Saint Vincent	Emory and Henry
First downs	8	21
Rushing yards	134	192
Passes attempted	13	27
Passes completed	4	16
Passing yards	34	142
Punt average	37.5	33.5
