= UT Martin Skyhawks =

Coordinates: 36.3418°N 88.8671°W

- University: University of Tennessee at Martin
- Nickname: Skyhawks
- NCAA: Division I (FCS)
- Conference: Ohio Valley Conference (primary); NIRA (Rodeo); ECAC (equestrian)
- Athletic director: Kurt McGuffin
- Location: Martin, Tennessee
- Varsity teams: 6 men's, 10 women's & 1 co-ed
- Football stadium: Hardy M. Graham Stadium
- Basketball arena: Kathleen and Tom Elam Center
- Baseball stadium: Skyhawk Baseball Field
- Softball stadium: Bettye Giles Softball Field
- Colors: Navy blue, orange, and white
- Mascot: Captain Skyhawk
- Fight song: UTM Skyhawks Fight Song
- Website: utmsports.com
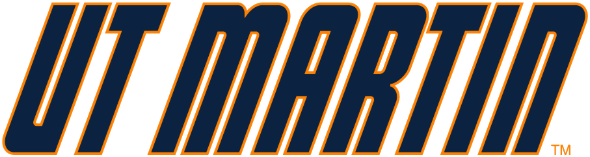

The UT Martin Skyhawks (also known as Tennessee–Martin Skyhawks) are the intercollegiate athletic teams that represent the University of Tennessee at Martin (UTM) in Martin, Tennessee, United States. The Skyhawks athletic program is a member of the Ohio Valley Conference (OVC) and competes at the NCAA Division I level including the Football Championship Subdivision. The UTM mascot is Captain Skyhawk. The school colors are navy and orange. They were known as the Pacers until 1995.

== Sports sponsored ==
A member of the Ohio Valley Conference, the University of Tennessee at Martin sponsors teams in five men's, nine women's, and one co-ed NCAA sanctioned sports.

Men's sports	Women's sports
Baseball	Beach volleyball
Basketball	Basketball
Cross country	Cross country
Football	Equestrian
Golf	Rodeo
Rodeo	Track and Field
Track and Field	Soccer
	Softball
	Volleyball
Co-ed sports
Rifle

== National championships ==
=== Individual ===
Association	Division	Sport	Year	Event	Individual(s)	Score
NCAA	Division I	Rifle (1)	1987	Air rifle	Rob Harbison	392
NIRA	College Rodeo	2015 National College Finals Rodeo	Team Title			

== Athletic facilities ==
- Baseball: Skyhawk Baseball Field
- Basketball: Kathleen and Tom Elam Center
- Beach Volleyball: Skyhawk Beach Volleyball Complex
- Equestrian: Ned McWherter Agricultural Complex
- Football: Hardy M. Graham Stadium & Bob Carroll Football Building
- Golf: Rhodes Golf Center & Jackson Country Club (Jackson, TN)
- Rifle: Skyhawk Rifle Range
- Soccer: Skyhawk Soccer Field
- Softball: Bettye Giles Softball Field
- Tennis: Skyhawk Tennis Complex
- Volleyball: Skyhawk Fieldhouse
- Rodeo: Ned McWherter Agricultural Complex

== Highlights ==
=== Basketball ===
In 2011, the Skyhawk women's basketball team qualified for the NCAA tournament for the first time. In 2011, 2012 and 2013, women's basketball made consecutive appearances in the national tournament.

=== Tennis ===
The Skyhawk women’s tennis team won its fifth Ohio Valley Conference championship in 2011. Coach Dennis Taylor also earned his sixth OVC Coach of the Year award.

In fall 1997, a women's club team was formed. The inaugural season of an NCAA Division 1 AA team was recognized in fall 1998. This team was coached by a former OPD coach, Dr. Ruth Holden.

=== Soccer ===
The Skyhawk soccer team claimed its first-ever Ohio Valley Conference Tournament championship in fall 2011 and made its first appearance in the NCAA women’s soccer tournament. The team repeated its Ohio Valley Conference Tournament championship victory in 2012 with the same enthusiasm. In 2013 UT Martin hosted the Ohio Valley Conference Tournament Championship at Skyhawk field for the first time in UT Martin soccer history.

=== Rodeo ===
The UT Martin rodeo team, the only collegiate rodeo team in Tennessee, is a member of the National Intercollegiate Rodeo Association. Recent successes include Jeff Askey’s winning the bull-riding national championship in 2010, the women’s rodeo team capturing the Ozark Region title in spring 2011, and the men’s team finishing second in the region. Both teams advanced in June 2011 to the College National Finals Rodeo. The UT Martin men's rodeo team won the 2014 College National Finals Rodeo Men's National Championship, becoming the first team east of the Mississippi River to win a national title in rodeo.
