= Naval Air Station Norman =

Former United States Navy air station

Coordinates: 35°14′24″N 97°27′39″W

Naval Air Station Norman is a former United States Navy air station. It was also called a Naval Flight Training Center.

The air station opened in 1942 as the navy sought to expand its training capacity during World War II. It was co-located at University of Oklahoma Westheimer Airport. After the War, the base was inactivated as the military downsized. The base was reactivated in 1952 and remained open until 1959. The base was turned over to the University of Oklahoma.

In 1944, the station fielded a football team called the Zoomers.

== Naval Air Technical Training Center ==
The Naval Air Technical Training Center was a different base located on the south section of Norman.
