= Virginia Little Eight Conference =

College sports conference, 1949–1965

The Virginia Little Eight Conference was an intercollegiate athletic conference with members located in the state of Virginia. It was known as the Virginia Little Six Conference prior to 1953 and the Virginia Little Seven Conference from 1953 to 1955. Many of its members now complete in the Old Dominion Athletic Conference (ODAC).

The members of the Virginia Little Six were Bridgewater College, Emory and Henry College—now known as Emory and Henry University, Hampden–Sydney College, Lynchburg College—now known as the University of Lynchburg, Randolph–Macon College, and Roanoke College. Richmond Professional Institute (RPI) joined the circuit as the seventh member in 1953. Norfolk Division of the College of William and Mary—now known as Old Dominion University—became the eight member in 1955.

== Football champions ==
- 1949 – Emory and Henry
- 1950 – Emory and Henry
- 1951 – Emory and Henry
- 1952 – Hampden–Sydney
- 1953 – Hampden–Sydney
- 1954 – Emory and Henry
- 1955 – Hampden–Sydney and Randolph–Macon
- 1956 – Emory and Henry
- 1957 – Hampden–Sydney
- 1958 – Randolph–Macon
- 1959 – Randolph–Macon
- 1960 – Randolph–Macon
- 1961 – Hampden–Sydney
- 1962 – Hampden–Sydney
- 1963 – Hampden–Sydney
- 1964 – Hampden–Sydney
- 1965 – Randolph–Macon

== Yearly football standings ==
1949 Virginia Little Six Conference football standings
	Conf.					Overall
Team	W		L		T	W		L		T
Emory and Henry $	2	–	0	–	0	11	–	1	–	0
Hampden–Sydney	1	–	1	–	0	5	–	4	–	0
Bridgewater	0	–	0	–	0	1	–	3	–	0
Randolph–Macon	0	–	2	–	0	2	–	7	–	0
$ – Conference champion

1950 Virginia Little Six Conference football standings
	Conf.					Overall
Team	W		L		T	W		L		T
Emory and Henry $	2	–	0	–	0	10	–	2	–	0
Randolph–Macon	2	–	1	–	0	5	–	4	–	0
Bridgewater	0	–	1	–	0	0	–	6	–	0
Hampden–Sydney	0	–	2	–	0	4	–	5	–	0
$ – Conference champion

1951 Virginia Little Six Conference football standings
	Conf.					Overall
Team	W		L		T	W		L		T
Emory and Henry $	2	–	0	–	0	9	–	0	–	1
Randolph–Macon	1	–	1	–	1	5	–	3	–	1
Hampden–Sydney	1	–	1	–	1	4	–	3	–	2
Bridgewater	0	–	2	–	0	1	–	3	–	0
$ – Conference champion

1952 Virginia Little Six Conference football standings
	Conf.					Overall
Team	W		L		T	W		L		T
Hampden–Sydney $	2	–	0	–	1	5	–	3	–	1
Emory and Henry	1	–	1	–	0	8	–	2	–	0
Randolph–Macon	1	–	1	–	1	5	–	3	–	1
Bridgewater	0	–	2	–	0	2	–	4	–	0
$ – Conference champion

1953 Virginia Little Six Conference football standings
	Conf.					Overall
Team	W		L		T	W		L		T
Hampden–Sydney $	3	–	0	–	0	5	–	1	–	1
Emory and Henry	1	–	1	–	0	6	–	5	–	0
Randolph–Macon	1	–	2	–	0	3	–	4	–	2
Bridgewater	0	–	2	–	0	3	–	3	–	0
$ – Conference champion

1954 Virginia Little Seven Conference football standings
	Conf.					Overall
Team	W		L		T	W		L		T
Emory and Henry $	2	–	0	–	0	4	–	3	–	3
Hampden–Sydney	2	–	1	–	0	5	–	3	–	0
Randolph–Macon	1	–	2	–	0	6	–	3	–	0
Bridgewater	0	–	2	–	0	2	–	4	–	1
$ – Conference champion

1955 Virginia Little Seven Conference football standings
	Conf.					Overall
Team	W		L		T	W		L		T
Hampden–Sydney +	2	–	1	–	0	8	–	1	–	0
Randolph–Macon +	2	–	1	–	0	6	–	2	–	1
Emory and Henry	1	–	1	–	0	6	–	3	–	1
Bridgewater	0	–	2	–	0	2	–	5	–	0
$ – Conference champion

1956 Virginia Little Eight Conference football standings
	Conf.					Overall
Team	W		L		T	W		L		T
Emory and Henry $	2	–	0	–	0	9	–	1	–	0
Hampden–Sydney	2	–	1	–	0	7	–	2	–	0
Randolph–Macon	1	–	2	–	0	4	–	4	–	0
Bridgewater	0	–	2	–	0	3	–	4	–	1
$ – Conference champion

1957 Virginia Little Eight Conference football standings
	Conf.					Overall
Team	W		L		T	W		L		T
Hampden–Sydney $	3	–	0	–	0	8	–	1	–	0
Emory and Henry	1	–	1	–	0	5	–	4	–	0
Randolph–Macon	1	–	2	–	0	3	–	3	–	2
Bridgewater	0	–	2	–	0	3	–	4	–	0
$ – Conference champion

1958 Virginia Little Eight Conference football standings
	Conf.					Overall
Team	W		L		T	W		L		T
Randolph–Macon $	2	–	0	–	0	5	–	4	–	0
Emory and Henry	1	–	0	–	0	7	–	2	–	0
Hampden–Sydney	1	–	2	–	0	6	–	3	–	0
Bridgewater	0	–	2	–	0	3	–	4	–	0
$ – Conference champion

1959 Virginia Little Eight Conference football standings
	Conf.					Overall
Team	W		L		T	W		L		T
Emory and Henry *	1	–	0	–	0	7	–	3	–	0
Randolph–Macon $	1	–	0	–	1	4	–	2	–	3
Hampden–Sydney	1	–	1	–	1	5	–	3	–	1
Bridgewater	0	–	2	–	0	2	–	6	–	0
$ – Conference champion; * – Emory and Henry did not play enough conference games to be eligible for the championship.

1960 Virginia Little Eight Conference football standings
	Conf.					Overall
Team	W		L		T	W		L		T
Randolph–Macon $	2	–	0	–	0	4	–	4	–	0
Emory and Henry	1	–	0	–	0	7	–	2	–	1
Hampden–Sydney	1	–	2	–	0	2	–	6	–	0
Bridgewater	0	–	2	–	0	0	–	7	–	0
$ – Conference champion

1961 Virginia Little Eight Conference football standings
	Conf.					Overall
Team	W		L		T	W		L		T
Emory and Henry *	1	–	0	–	0	5	–	4	–	0
Hampden–Sydney $	2	–	1	–	0	3	–	6	–	0
Randolph–Macon	1	–	1	–	0	4	–	5	–	0
Bridgewater	0	–	2	–	0	0	–	8	–	0
$ – Conference champion; * – Emory and Henry did not play enough conference games to be eligible for the championship.

1962 Virginia Little Eight Conference football standings
	Conf.					Overall
Team	W		L		T	W		L		T
Emory and Henry *	1	–	0	–	0	8	–	0	–	1
Hampden–Sydney $	2	–	1	–	0	6	–	4	–	0
Bridgewater	1	–	1	–	0	3	–	3	–	0
Randolph–Macon	0	–	2	–	0	2	–	6	–	0
$ – Conference champion; * – Emory and Henry did not play enough conference games to be eligible for the championship.

1963 Virginia Little Eight Conference football standings
	Conf.					Overall
Team	W		L		T	W		L		T
Hampden–Sydney $	2	–	0	–	0	6	–	3	–	0
Bridgewater	1	–	1	–	0	2	–	4	–	1
Emory and Henry	0	–	0	–	0	8	–	2	–	1
Randolph–Macon	0	–	2	–	0	3	–	6	–	0
$ – Conference champion

1964 Virginia Little Eight Conference football standings
	Conf.					Overall
Team	W		L		T	W		L		T
Hampden–Sydney $	4	–	1	–	0	6	–	4	–	0
Randolph–Macon	2	–	1	–	0	3	–	6	–	0
Frederick	1	–	1	–	0	4	–	7	–	0
Emory and Henry	1	–	1	–	0	2	–	8	–	0
Washington and Lee	1	–	2	–	0	4	–	5	–	0
Bridgewater	0	–	3	–	0	3	–	5	–	0
$ – Conference champion

1965 Virginia Little Eight Conference football standings
	Conf.					Overall
Team	W		L		T	W		L		T
Randolph–Macon $	3	–	0	–	0	7	–	2	–	0
Emory and Henry	1	–	0	–	0	3	–	6	–	0
Hampden–Sydney	3	–	2	–	0	6	–	3	–	0
Washington and Lee	1	–	2	–	0	3	–	6	–	0
Frederick	0	–	1	–	0	4	–	6	–	0
Bridgewater	0	–	3	–	0	1	–	7	–	0
$ – Conference champion

== See also ==
- List of defunct college football conferences
