= Ohio Valley Conference =

US college athletic conference

- Association: NCAA
- Founded: 1948; 78 years ago
- Commissioner: Matt Wilson (since 2026)
- Sports fielded: 20; men's: 9; women's: 10; coeducational: 1
- Division: Division I
- Subdivision: FCS
- No. of teams: 9
- Headquarters: Brentwood, Tennessee
- Region: Midwest and South
- Broadcaster: ESPN
- Website: ovcsports.com

Locations

Ohio Valley Conference
Location of member schools:
full

The Ohio Valley Conference (OVC) is a collegiate athletic conference that operates in the Midwestern and Southeastern United States. It participates in Division I of the NCAA, with its football programs competing in the Football Championship Subdivision, the lower of two levels of Division I football competition. The OVC has 11 members, six of which (plus two football-only members) compete in football in the conference.

== History ==
Primary source:
The Ohio Valley Conference can trace its roots to 1941 when Murray State athletic director Roy Stewart, Eastern Kentucky athletic director Charles "Turkey" Hughes, and Western Kentucky public relations director Kelly Thompson first formulated the idea of establishing a regional athletics conference. The plan was put on hold due to World War II, but it was resurrected after the conclusion of the war. In 1948, the three schools joined with Louisville, Morehead State, and Evansville to form the Ohio Valley Conference. While many collegiate conferences are struggling today with the question of whether their policies and rules should be determined by the athletic departments or by the institutional heads, from the very beginning, the OVC has been run by the presidents of its member schools.

Historically, the OVC was a pioneer in racial desegregation, with Morehead State signing the conference's first Black athlete, Marshall Banks, in 1958. The rest of the OVC soon followed in Morehead State's wake. From 1986 to 2018, the OVC was unique among NCAA Division I conferences in that it included one historically Black university, Tennessee State University, in a conference that otherwise consists of institutions that are not traditionally Black. During this period, every other HBCU in NCAA Division I belonged to either the Mid-Eastern Athletic Conference or Southwestern Athletic Conference. That distinction changed when both Hampton University and North Carolina A&T State University joined the Big South Conference in 2018 and 2021, respectively; both schools have since joined the Coastal Athletic Association.

The OVC has also been a leader in advancement of sports opportunities for women. The conference began adding championship competitions for women in 1977 several years after the AIAW began sponsoring national championships for women, but seven years before the NCAA was ready to move into the field. Since 2009, the OVC has been led by Commissioner Beth DeBauche, one of only six female commissioners for the thirty-two Division I conferences.

The close geographic proximity of the schools paired with athletic rivalries led to problems with fan behavior, and the conference leadership struggled with controlling the issue for many years. When the national debate on the problem reached its apex in the mid-1990s, the OVC unveiled the national first of its kind "Sportsmanship Statement" in 1995, stating the conference's policy on, "... principles of fair play, ethical conduct and respect for one's opponent." Since then, the OVC has also introduced individual, team (for each sport), and institutional sportsmanship awards.

Founded by six schools, the expansions of 2007 and 2011 brought the Ohio Valley Conference membership to twelve schools, the most in its history. The OVC dropped to 10 members after the 2020–21 school year, when founding member Eastern Kentucky and Jacksonville State left for the Atlantic Sun Conference (then branded as the ASUN Conference; "ASUN" is still the official abbreviation). At that time, the OVC was searching for teams to replace both.

The OVC lost three more members after the 2021–22 school year. Football-sponsoring Austin Peay left for the ASUN, which ultimately launched its own football league in 2022. Non-football Belmont left for the Missouri Valley Conference. Another football school, founding member Murray State, left for the MVC. When announcing its move to the MVC, Murray State announced that it was seeking membership in the football-only Missouri Valley Football Conference, and also announced that it would continue to house its rifle team in the OVC. In a separate statement, Murray State's president indicated that the football team would remain in the OVC in the 2022 season, ensuring that the OVC would retain its automatic bid to the FCS playoffs in that season and giving the league more time to add new football members. Murray State would eventually be accepted by the MVFC effective in 2023.

Also in July 2022, the OVC added two non-football members in the University of Arkansas at Little Rock, athletically known as Little Rock, and the University of Southern Indiana, which started a transition from NCAA Division II, plus a new football-sponsoring member in Lindenwood University, also transitioning from D-II.

According to a report from Matt Brown of the Extra Points college sports blog, the OVC expected to lose Murray State, and was considering multiple expansion candidates, with Southern Indiana among them. Other schools named by Brown's sources as possible candidates were FCS programs Arkansas–Pine Bluff and Western Illinois, plus potential Division II upgraders Grand Valley State, Hillsdale, and Lincoln Memorial.

On February 22, 2022, the conference announced its intent to combine its football membership with the Big South Conference beginning in 2023 and operate as the OVC–Big South Football Association. The alliance follows the model that the ASUN and Western Athletic Conference used in 2021 and 2022 before merging their football leagues in 2023 as the United Athletic Conference. This alliance effectively ended on June 18, 2026, when the OVC announced it would return to the OVC name and branding for its football-playing members and take in Charleston Southern and Gardner–Webb as affiliate members.

Shortly after the 2022 membership changes took effect, the OVC and the Horizon League jointly announced that they would merge their men's tennis leagues under the Horizon banner, effective immediately. All five OVC members that sponsored men's tennis became Horizon affiliates in that sport.

On March 28, 2023, the OVC announced it was adding men's soccer as its 19th championship sport. The four OVC members sponsoring the sport in other conferences were joined by Chicago State University, Houston Christian University, University of the Incarnate Word, and Liberty University. Chicago State was also announced as an incoming men's and women's golf associate on that day. Chicago State's OVC teams left the conference at the end of the 2023–24 school year when the university joined the Northeast Conference, which sponsors all sports that CSU housed in the OVC.

On May 12, 2023, it was announced that Western Illinois University would join the OVC from the Summit League in most non-football sports beginning for the 2023 season. Western Illinois football, which was then a member of the Missouri Valley Football Conference, played the 2023 season in that league before joining the university's other sports in the OVC for the 2024 season. Western later announced its men's soccer team would also play the 2023 season in its former all-sports home of the Summit League before joining the OVC in 2024.

== OVC Digital Network ==
In August 2012, the OVC announced that it had launched the OVC Digital Network as a replacement for and improvement over the conference's former efforts to provide streaming video coverage of many athletic events that had been in place since 2006. This website carried live, student-produced coverage of most conference games and some non-conference games in baseball, men's and women's basketball, football, soccer, softball, and volleyball as well as some coaches' shows, special presentations, and archived game-casts available for later viewing.

In its first two years, the network provided well over 600,000 viewings of streamed live video of more than 1,400 events.

In the 2018–19 school year, the coverage previously carried on the OVC Digital Network was switched over to ESPN+.

== Member schools ==
=== Full members ===
Institution	Location	Founded	Type	Enrollment	Endowment (millions)	Nickname	Joined (Note: Represents the calendar year when fall sports competition begins.)	Colors
Eastern Illinois University	Charleston, Illinois	1895	Public	8,107	$87.3	Panthers	1996	
Lindenwood University	St. Charles, Missouri	1827	Nonsectarian	7,288	$143.4	Lions	2022	
Morehead State University	Morehead, Kentucky	1887	Public	8,618	$71	Eagles	1948	
Southeast Missouri State University (Southeast Missouri)	Cape Girardeau, Missouri	1873	Public	9,686	$84.2	Redhawks	1991	
Southern Illinois University Edwardsville (SIUE)	Edwardsville, Illinois	1957	Public	12,045	$27.4	Cougars	2008	
University of Southern Indiana	Evansville, Indiana	1965	Public	9,282	$103	Screaming; Eagles	2022	
Tennessee State University	Nashville, Tennessee	1912	Public	8,198	$91.1	Tigers & Lady Tigers	1986 (Note: The Tennessee State men's basketball team joined the OVC a year after becoming a full member for other sports (1987–88); while its football team joined the OVC two years after (1988–89).)	
University of Tennessee at Martin	Martin, Tennessee	1927	Public	6,941	$51	Skyhawks	1992	
Western Illinois University	Macomb, Illinois	1899	Public	5,337	$63.6	Leathernecks	2023 (Note: The Western Illinois men's soccer team joined the OVC a year after becoming a full member for other sports (2024–25). The football team similarly did not join the OVC–Big South Football Association until 2024.)	

=== Affiliate members ===
Years listed in this table are calendar years. For schools that play only spring sports (such as beach volleyball) in the OVC, the calendar year of arrival precedes the first season of competition.

Institution	Location	Founded	Type	Enrollment	Nickname	Joined (Note: Represents the calendar year when fall sports competition begins.)	Colors	OVC sport(s)	Primary conference
Bryant University	Smithfield, Rhode Island	1863	Nonsectarian	3,751	Bulldogs	2024		Men's golf	America East (AmEast)
Bryant University	Smithfield, Rhode Island	1863	Nonsectarian	3,751	Bulldogs	2024		Women's golf	America East (AmEast)
Bryant University	Smithfield, Rhode Island	1863	Nonsectarian	3,751	Bulldogs	2024		Women's tennis	America East (AmEast)
Charleston Southern University	North Charleston, South Carolina	1964	Southern; Baptist	3,414	Buccaneers	2026 (Note: Competed in the OVC–Big South Football Association from the 2023 to 2025 fall seasons (2023–24 to 2025–26 school years).)		Football	Big South (BSC)
Gardner–Webb University	Boiling Springs, North Carolina	1905	Southern; Baptist	3,594	Runnin'; Bulldogs	2026		Football	Big South (BSC)
Houston Christian University	Houston, Texas	1960	Baptist	2,567	Huskies	2023		Men's soccer	Southland (SLC)
University of the Incarnate Word	San Antonio, Texas	1881	Catholic (C.C.V.I.)	9,366	Cardinals	2023		Men's soccer	Southland (SLC)
Murray State University (Note: Murray State was a full member of the OVC from 1948–49 to 2021–22.) (Note: Murray State competed in the OVC as an affiliate member for football during the 2022 fall season (2022–23 school year).)	Murray, Kentucky	1922	Public	10,495	Racers	2022		Rifle	Missouri Valley (MVC)
Tennessee Technological University (Note: Tennessee Tech was a full member of the OVC from 1949–50 to 2025–26.) (Tennessee Tech)	Cookeville, Tennessee	1915	Public	9,902	Golden Eagles	2026 (Note: Measured from Tennessee Tech's departure as a full OVC member.)		Beach volleyball	Southern (SoCon)
University of Tennessee at Chattanooga (UTC, Chattanooga)	Chattanooga, Tennessee	1886	Public	11,388	Mocs (Note: Former nickname was known as Moccasins until 1996, when it was shorten to its current nickname.)	2019 (Note: Originally joined the OVC as an affiliate member for beach volleyball in the 2020 spring season (2019–20 school year); only to have that season suspended due to the COVID-19 pandemic. The Mocs began conference-play competition the following school year.)		Beach volleyball	Southern (SoCon)
University of Texas Rio Grande Valley (UTRGV)	Edinburg, Texas	2013 (Note: UTRGV was formally founded in 2013, but did not start instruction until 2015.)	Public	32,419	Vaqueros	2026		Men's soccer	Southland (SLC)

=== Former full members ===
Institution	Location	Founded	Type	Nickname	Joined (Note: Represents the calendar year when fall sports competition begins.)	Left (Note: Represents the calendar year when spring sports competition ends.)	Colors	Conference they joined after leaving the OVC	Current conference
University of Akron	Akron, Ohio	1870	Public	Zips	1980	1987		D-I Independent	Mid-American (MAC)
University of Arkansas at Little Rock (Note: Little Rock announced it will join the United Athletic Conference on July 1, 2026.) (Little Rock (Note: Formerly branded athletically as Arkansas–Little Rock (or UALR).))	Little Rock, Arkansas	1927	Public	Trojans	2022	2026		United (UAC)	
Austin Peay State University (Austin Peay)	Clarksville, Tennessee	1927	Public	Governors	1962	2022		Atlantic Sun (ASUN)	United (UAC)
Belmont University	Nashville, Tennessee	1890	Private	Bruins	2012	2022		Missouri Valley (MVC)	
East Tennessee State University (ETSU)	Johnson City, Tennessee	1911	Public	Buccaneers & Lady Buccaneers (Note: Since leaving the OVC, East Tennessee State (ETSU) has dropped the word "Lady" from its women's team nicknames.)	1958	1978		Southern (SoCon)	
Eastern Kentucky University (EKU)	Richmond, Kentucky	1906	Public	Colonels	1948	2021		Atlantic Sun (ASUN)	United (UAC)
University of Evansville	Evansville, Indiana	1854	Private	Purple Aces	1948	1952		Indiana (ICC) (Note: Currently an NCAA Division II athletic conference.)	Missouri Valley (MVC)
Jacksonville State University (Jax State)	Jacksonville, Alabama	1883	Public	Gamecocks	2003	2021		Atlantic Sun (ASUN)	Conf. USA (CUSA)
University of Louisville	Louisville, Kentucky	1798	Public	Cardinals	1948	1949		Independent	Atlantic Coast (ACC)
Marshall University	Huntington, West Virginia	1837	Public	Thundering Herd	1949	1952		Independent (Note: Marshall left the OVC to become an Independent for one year prior to joining the Mid-American Conference (MAC), beginning the 1953–54 school year.)	Sun Belt (SBC)
Middle Tennessee State University (Middle Tennessee or MTSU)	Murfreesboro, Tennessee	1911	Public	Blue Raiders	1952	2000		Sun Belt (SBC)	Conf. USA (CUSA)
Murray State University (Note: Murray State remains in the OVC as an affiliate member for rifle.)	Murray, Kentucky	1922	Public	Racers	1948	2022		Missouri Valley (MVC)	
Samford University	Homewood, Alabama	1841	Private	Bulldogs	2003	2008		Southern (SoCon)	
Tennessee Technological University (Note: Tennessee Tech remains in the OVC as an affiliate member for beach volleyball.) (Tennessee Tech)	Cookeville, Tennessee	1915	Public	Golden Eagles	1949	2026		Southern (SoCon)	
Western Kentucky University (Note: Western Kentucky rejoined the OVC for football only in the 1999 and 2000 football seasons (1999–2000 and 2000–01 school years).) (WKU)	Bowling Green, Kentucky	1906	Public	Hilltoppers & Lady Toppers	1948	1982		Sun Belt (SBC)	Conf. USA (CUSA)
Youngstown State University	Youngstown, Ohio	1908	Public	Penguins	1981	1988		Mid-Continent (Note: At the moment they left the OVC, Youngstown State's football team became an NCAA I-AA Independent.)	Horizon (Note: Youngstown State's football team currently competes in the Missouri Valley Football Conference (MVFC).)

=== Former affiliate members ===
Institution	Location	Founded	Type	Nickname	Joined (Note: Represents the calendar year when fall sports competition begins.)	Left (Note: Represents the calendar year when spring sports competition ends.)	Colors	OVC sport(s)	Current primary conference	Current conference in former OVC sport
Chicago State University	Chicago, Illinois	1867	Public	Cougars	2023	2024		Men's soccer	Northeast (NEC)	
Chicago State University	Chicago, Illinois	1867	Public	Cougars	2023	2024		Men's golf	Northeast (NEC)	
Chicago State University	Chicago, Illinois	1867	Public	Cougars	2023	2024		Women's golf	Northeast (NEC)	
Columbus State University	Columbus, Georgia	1958	Public	Cougars	2012	2015		Rifle	Peach Belt (PBC) (Note: Currently an NCAA Division II athletic conference.)	none (Note: Columbus State dropped rifle after the 2014–15 school year.)
Liberty University	Lynchburg, Virginia	1971	Southern; Baptist	Flames	2023	2026		Men's soccer	Conf. USA (CUSA)	Southern (SoCon)
Murray State University (Note: Murray State remains in the OVC as an affiliate member for rifle.)	Murray, Kentucky	1922	Public	Racers	2022 (Note: Measured from Murray State's departure as a full OVC member.)	2023		Football	Missouri Valley (MVC)	Missouri Valley (MVFC)
Western Kentucky University (Note: Western Kentucky was a full member of the OVC from 1948–49 to 1979–80.) (WKU)	Bowling Green, Kentucky	1906	Public	Hilltoppers & Lady Toppers	1999	2001		Football	Conf. USA (CUSA)	

=== Membership timeline ===
Full member (all sports) Full member (non-football) Associate member (football) Associate member (sport) Other Conference Other Conference

==== Comments ====
- Morehead State's football team competes in the Pioneer Football League, a Division I FCS football-only conference whose members choose not to offer athletic scholarships for football.
- Austin Peay's football team left the OVC after the 1996 season to compete as an NCAA D-I FCS Independent. After four seasons as an Independent, the team joined the Pioneer Football League in 2001, and remained there through the 2005 season. Austin Peay then returned to scholarship football, spending the 2006 season as an Independent before re-entering OVC football competition in 2007.

== Conference divisions ==
Starting with the 2012–13 school year, the twelve member schools were split into two divisions for those sports where all schools competed. In the 2014–15 season, women's sports with twelve teams returned to a single league table, while continuing to play a divisional schedule. Men's basketball moved to an 18-game schedule in 2017–18, and they continued to play home-and-home versus the former divisional rivals, and they play home-and-home versus two teams from the other division, with those opponents on a rotation that sets up different pairs from year-to-year. The OVC returned to a single-table format after Eastern Kentucky and Jacksonville State left in 2021.

East Division	West Division
Belmont	Austin Peay
Eastern Kentucky	Eastern Illinois
Jacksonville State	Murray State
Morehead State	SIU Edwardsville
Tennessee State	Southeast Missouri
Tennessee Tech	UT Martin

== Sports offered ==
The Ohio Valley Conference currently offers championship competition in 19 NCAA sanctioned sports, with eight for men, 10 for women, and rifle for men's, women's, and coed teams.

Teams in OVC competition
Sport	Men's	Women's	Coed
Baseball	8	–	–
Basketball	9	9	–
Beach Volleyball	–	6	–
Cross Country	9	9	–
Football	8	–	–
Golf	9	7	–
Rifle	0	0	3
Soccer	8	8	–
Softball	–	9	–
Tennis	–	7	–
Track and Field (Indoor)	7	9	–
Track and Field (Outdoor)	8	9	–
Volleyball	–	9	–

=== Men's sponsored sports by school ===
Departing members are displayed in red.

School	Baseball	Basketball	Cross Country	Football	Golf	Rifle (Note: Rifle is technically a men's sport, but men's, women's, and coed teams all compete against each other.)	Soccer	Track & Field (Indoor)	Track & Field (Outdoor)	Total OVC Sports
Eastern Illinois	Yes	Yes	Yes	Yes	Yes	No	Yes	Yes	Yes	8
Lindenwood	Yes	Yes	Yes	Yes	Yes	No	Yes	No	No	6
Morehead State	Yes	Yes	Yes	No (Note: Morehead State football competes at the FCS level in the non-scholarship Pioneer Football League.)	Yes	Yes (Note: Fields a single coed rifle team.)	No	No	Yes	6
SIU Edwardsville	Yes	Yes	Yes	No	Yes	No	Yes	Yes	Yes	7
Southeast Missouri	Yes	Yes	Yes	Yes	No	No	No	Yes	Yes	6
Southern Indiana	Yes	Yes	Yes	No	Yes	No	Yes	Yes	Yes	7
Tennessee State	No (Note: Tennessee State plans to begin sponsoring baseball by no later than 2028.)	Yes	Yes	Yes	Yes	No	No	Yes	Yes	6
UT Martin	Yes	Yes	Yes	Yes	Yes	Yes (Note: Fields two separate rifle teams—one coed, and one women-only.)	No	Yes	Yes	8
Western Illinois	Yes	Yes	Yes	Yes	Yes	No	Yes	Yes	Yes	8
Associate members
Bryant					Yes					1
Charleston Southern				Yes						1
Gardner–Webb				Yes						1
Houston Christian							Yes			1
Incarnate Word							Yes			1
Murray State						Yes				1
UTRGV							Yes			1
Totals	8	9	9	8	9	3	8	7	8	70

Notes

Men's varsity sports not sponsored by the Ohio Valley Conference which are played by OVC schools

School	Ice Hockey	Swimming & Diving	Rodeo (Note: Rodeo is sanctioned by the National Intercollegiate Rodeo Association (NIRA), not the NCAA.)	Tennis	Volleyball	Wrestling
Eastern Illinois	–	Summit	–	– (Note: Eastern Illinois dropped men's tennis immediately after the 2024–25 season.)	–	–
Lindenwood	Independent	–	–	–	MIVA	–
SIU Edwardsville	–	–	–	–	–	MAC
Southern Indiana	–	Summit	–	Horizon	–	–
Tennessee State	(Note: Tennessee State will add men's ice hockey for the 2026–27 season. They will tentatively compete as an independent.)	–	–	Horizon	–	–
UT Martin	–	–	NIRA (Note: UT Martin considers rodeo to be a varsity sport.)	–	–	–

=== Women's sponsored sports by school ===
Departing members in red.

School	Basketball	Beach Volleyball	Cross Country	Golf	Rifle (Note: Rifle is technically a men's sport, but men's, women's, and coed teams all compete against each other. All competing OVC schools have coed teams, and UT Martin has both a women's and a coed team.)	Soccer	Softball	Tennis	Track & Field (Indoor)	Track & Field (Outdoor)	Volleyball (Indoor)	Total OVC Sports
Eastern Illinois	Yes	Yes	Yes	Yes	No	Yes	Yes	No (Note: Eastern Illinois dropped women's tennis immediately after the 2024–25 season.)	Yes	Yes	Yes	9
Lindenwood	Yes	Yes	Yes	Yes	No	Yes	Yes	Yes	Yes	Yes	Yes	10
Morehead State	Yes	Yes	Yes	Yes	Yes^{†}	Yes	Yes	No	Yes	Yes	Yes	10
Southeast Missouri	Yes	No	Yes	No	No	Yes	Yes	Yes	Yes	Yes	Yes	8
Southern Indiana	Yes	No	Yes	Yes	No	Yes	Yes	Yes	Yes	Yes	Yes	9
SIU Edwardsville	Yes	No	Yes	No	No	Yes	Yes	Yes	Yes	Yes	Yes	8
Tennessee State	Yes	No	Yes	Yes	No	No (Note: Tennessee State plans to begin sponsoring women's soccer by no later than 2028.)	Yes	Yes	Yes	Yes	Yes	8
UT Martin	Yes	Yes	Yes	No	Yesx2^{†}	Yes	Yes	No	Yes	Yes	Yes	9
Western Illinois	Yes	No	Yes	Yes	No	Yes	Yes	Yes	Yes	Yes	Yes	10
Associate members
Bryant				Yes				Yes				2
Chattanooga		Yes										1
Murray State					Yes^{†}							1
Tennessee Tech		Yes										1
Totals	9	6	9	7	4	8	9	7	9	9	9	87

Women's varsity sports not sponsored by the Ohio Valley Conference which are played by OVC schools

School	Equestrian (Note: Part of the NCAA Emerging Sports for Women program.)	Gymnastics	Ice Hockey	Lacrosse	Rodeo (Note: Rodeo is sanctioned by the National Intercollegiate Rodeo Association (NIRA), not the NCAA. UT Martin considers rodeo to be a varsity sport.)	Stunt (Note: Graduated from the NCAA Emerging Sports for Women program in January 2026. The first NCAA championship will be held in 2026–27.)	Swimming & Diving	Wrestling
Eastern Illinois	—	—	—	—	—	—	Summit	–
Lindenwood	—	—	AHA	ASUN	—	—	—	Independent
Southeast Missouri	—	MIC	—	—	—	—	–	–
Southern Indiana	–	–	–	–	–	—	Summit	–
Tennessee State	–	–	–	–	–	—	(Note: Tennessee State plans to begin sponsoring women's swimming & diving by no later than 2028.)	–
UT Martin	ECAC	—	—	—	NIRA	Independent	—	—

== Conference champions ==
=== Football ===
This is a list of the champions between 2010 and the 2023 establishment of the OVC–Big South Football Association. For the complete history, see List of Ohio Valley Conference football champions.

Year	Regular season champion	Record	FCS Championship Result
2010	Southeast Missouri State	7–1	Second Round
2011	Tennessee Tech*; Eastern Kentucky; Jacksonville State	6–2; 6–2; 6–2	First Round; First Round; DNP
2012	Eastern Illinois	6–1	First Round
2013	Eastern Illinois	8–0	Quarterfinals
2014	Jacksonville State	8–0	Second Round
2015	Jacksonville State	8–0	FCS Championship Runner Up
2016	Jacksonville State	7–0	First Round
2017	Jacksonville State	8–0	Second Round
2018	Jacksonville State	7–1	Second Round
2019	Austin Peay**; Southeast Missouri State	7–1	Quarterfinals; First Round
2020	Jacksonville State	6–1	Quarterfinals
2021	UT Martin	5–1	Second Round
2022	Southeast Missouri State***; UT Martin	5–0	First Round

- – Tennessee Tech won the tie-breaker and received the automatic bid to the FCS playoffs.
  - – Austin Peay won the tie-breaker and received the automatic bid to the FCS Playoffs.
    - – Southeast Missouri won the tie-breaker and received the automatic bid to the FCS Playoffs.

=== Basketball ===
This is a list of the champions since 2010. For the complete men's history, see List of Ohio Valley Conference men's basketball champions.

Year	Men's			Women's		
Year	Regular season champion	Record	Tournament champion	Regular season champion	Record	Tournament champion
2010–11	Murray State	14–4	Morehead State Tourney	Tennessee Tech	15–3	UT Martin
2011–12	Murray State	15–1	Murray State Tourney	UT Martin	15–1	UT Martin
2012–13	East: Belmont; West: Murray State	14–2; 10–6	Belmont Tourney	East: Tennessee Tech; West: Eastern Illinois	12–4; 12–4	UT Martin
2013–14	East: Belmont; West: Murray State	14–2; 13–3	Eastern Kentucky Tourney	East: Belmont; West: UT Martin	10–6; 15–1	UT Martin
2014–15	East: Eastern Kentucky & Belmont; West: Murray State	11–5; 16–0	Belmont Tourney	UT Martin	16–0	Tennessee State
2015–16	East: Belmont; West: UT Martin & Murray State	12–4; 10–6	Austin Peay Tourney	UT Martin	14–2	Belmont
2016–17	East: Belmont; West: UT Martin	15–1; 10–6	Jacksonville State Tourney	Belmont	16–0	Belmont
2017–18	Murray State	15–2	Murray State Tourney	Belmont	18–0	Belmont Tourney
2018–19	Belmont; Murray State	16–2	Murray State Tourney	Belmont	16–2	Belmont Tourney
2019–20	Belmont; Murray State	15–3	Belmont Tourney	Belmont; UT Martin	16–2	Southeast Missouri State Tourney
2020–21	Belmont	18–2	Morehead State Tourney	UT Martin	17–4	Belmont Tourney
2021–22	Murray State	18–0	Murray State Tourney	Belmont	16–2	Belmont Tourney
2022–23	Morehead State	14–4	Southeast Missouri Tourney	Little Rock	17–1	Tennessee Tech Tourney
2023–24	Little Rock; Morehead State; UT Martin	14–4	Morehead State Tourney	Southern Indiana	17–1	Southern Indiana Tourney
2024–25	Southeast Missouri	15–5	SIUE Tourney	Tennessee Tech	18–2	Tennessee Tech Tourney

=== Baseball ===
This is a list of the champions since 2010.

Year	Regular season champion	OVC record	Season record	Tournament champion	OVC record	Season record
2010	Tennessee Tech	14–6	31–25	Jacksonville State	15–8	32–26
2011	Austin Peay	17–6	34–24	Austin Peay	17–6	34–24
2012	Austin Peay; Eastern Kentucky	19–7	40–24; 31–23	Austin Peay	19–7	40–24
2013	Tennessee Tech	24–6	40–17	Austin Peay	22–7	47–15
2014	Southeast Missouri	23–7	37–20	Jacksonville State	18–12	36–27
2015	Southeast Missouri	22–8	36–23	Morehead State	20–10	38–22
2016	Southeast Missouri	22–8	39–21	Southeast Missouri	22–8	39–21
2017	Tennessee Tech	23–7	39–18	Tennessee Tech	23–7	39–18
2018	Tennessee Tech	27–3	53–12	Morehead State	18–12	37–26
2019	Jacksonville State	22–8	39–23	Jacksonville State	22–8	39–23
2020	Canceled					
2021	Southeast Missouri	17–10	30–22	Southeast Missouri	17–10	30–22
2022	Belmont	18–6	39–20	Southeast Missouri	16–8	37–22
2023	Morehead State	16–7	36–20	Eastern Illinois	13–11	38–21
2024	Little Rock	19–8	32–24	Southeast Missouri	18–9	36–27
2025	Eastern Illinois	17–7	31–22	Little Rock	8–16	27–34

=== Softball ===
This is a list of the champions since 2010.

Year	Regular season champion	OVC record	Season record	Tournament champion	OVC record	Season record
2010	UT Martin	22–3	47–11	Jacksonville State	13–6	30–19
2011	Eastern Illinois	26–4	40–12	Jacksonville State	21–9	40–21
2012	UT Martin	23–6	39–22	UT Martin	23–6	39–22
2013	East– Eastern Kentucky; West– Eastern Illinois	19–6; 20–3	36–20; 36–14	Jacksonville State	11–11	30–27
2014	East– Jacksonville State; West– SIUE	22–5; 19–5	40–15; 30–23	SIUE	19–5	30–23
2015	SIUE	20–6	43–16	Tennessee Tech	15–11	33–28
2016	Jacksonville State	26–0	43–17	Jacksonville State	26–0	43–17
2017	Jacksonville State	15–1	41–12	Jacksonville State	15–1	41–12
2018	Eastern Kentucky	19–3	45–21	Jacksonville State	16–6	35–25
2019	Southeast Missouri State; Jacksonville State	17–5	46–18; 36–15	Southeast Missouri State	17–5	46–18
2020	Canceled					
2021	Southeast Missouri	23–6	30–17	Eastern Kentucky	22–9	35–17
2022	Murray State	21–7	40–18–1	Murray State	21–7	40–18–1
2023	Southeast Missouri	20–2	29–14	Eastern Illinois	16–6	34–21
2024	Eastern Illinois	22–5	40–17	Southeast Missouri	19–8	28–26
2025	Eastern Illinois	21–5	34–22	Eastern Illinois	21–5	34–22

=== Men's soccer ===
Men's soccer was first sponsored by the OVC in 2023.

Year	Regular season champions	Tournament champions
2023	SIUE	SIUE
2024	SIUE	SIUE
2025	Lindenwood	Lindenwood

=== Women's soccer ===
This is a list of champions since 2010.

Year	Regular season champions	Tournament champions
2010	Morehead State	Morehead State
2011	Southeast Missouri	UT Martin
2012	UT Martin	UT Martin
2013	UT Martin	Morehead State
2014	Southeast Missouri	SIUE
2015	Murray State	Murray State
2016	Murray State	SIUE
2017	Murray State	Murray State
2018	UT Martin	Murray State
2019	Southeast Missouri	Belmont
2020–21	Murray State	SIUE
2021	UT Martin	SIUE
2022	Tennessee Tech	SIUE
2023	Tennessee Tech	Morehead State
2024	Tennessee Tech	Lindenwood
2025	Tennessee Tech	Tennessee Tech

== Facilities ==
School	Football stadium	Capacity	Soccer stadium	Capacity	Basketball arena	Capacity	Baseball stadium	Capacity	Softball stadium	Capacity	Volleyball arena	Capacity
Eastern Illinois	O'Brien Field	10,000	Lakeside Soccer Field	1,000	Lantz Arena	5,300	Coaches Stadium at Monier Field	500	Williams Field	200	Lantz Arena	5,300
Lindenwood	Hunter Stadium	7,450	Hunter Stadium	7,450	Hyland Arena	3,270	Lou Brock Sports Complex	700	Lou Brock Sports Complex	300	Hyland Arena	3,270
Morehead State	Phil Simms Stadium	10,000	Phil Simms Stadium	10,000	Ellis Johnson Arena	6,500	John "Sonny" Allen Field	1,200	University Field	500	Ellis Johnson Arena	6,500
Southeast Missouri State	Houck Stadium	11,015	Houck Stadium	11,015	Show Me Center	6,972	Capaha Field	2,000	Southeast Softball Complex	1,000	Houck Fieldhouse	1,000
Southern Indiana	Non-football school		Strassweg Field	550	Liberty Arena	4,800	USI Baseball Field	1,200	USI Softball Field	400	Liberty Arena	4,800
SIU Edwardsville	Non-football school		Ralph Korte Stadium	4,000	First Community Arena	4,000	Roy E. Lee Field at Simmons Baseball Complex	1,500	Cougar Field	800	First Community Arena	4,000
Tennessee State	Nissan Stadium	68,000	Non-soccer school		Gentry Complex	10,500	Non-baseball school		Tiger Field	500	Kean Hall	2,500
UT Martin	Graham Stadium	7,500	Skyhawk Soccer Field	500	Skyhawk Arena	4,300	Skyhawk Baseball Field	500	Bettye Giles Softball Field	500	Skyhawk Fieldhouse	3,000
Western Illinois	Hanson Field	16,368	John MacKenzie Alumni Field	1,000	Western Hall	5,139	Alfred D. Boyer Stadium	500	Mary Ellen McKee Stadium	550	Western Hall	5,139

Affiliate members
School	Football stadium	Capacity	Soccer stadium	Capacity
Charleston Southern	Buccaneer Field	4,000	Football-only member	
Gardner–Webb	Ernest W. Spangler Stadium	7,800	Football-only member	
Houston Christian	Men's soccer-only member		Sorrels Field	500
Incarnate Word	Men's soccer-only member		Gayle and Tom Benson Stadium	6,000
UTRGV	Men's soccer-only member		UTRGV Soccer and Track & Field Complex	1,555
