= Bristol Municipal Stadium =

- U.S. National Register of Historic Places
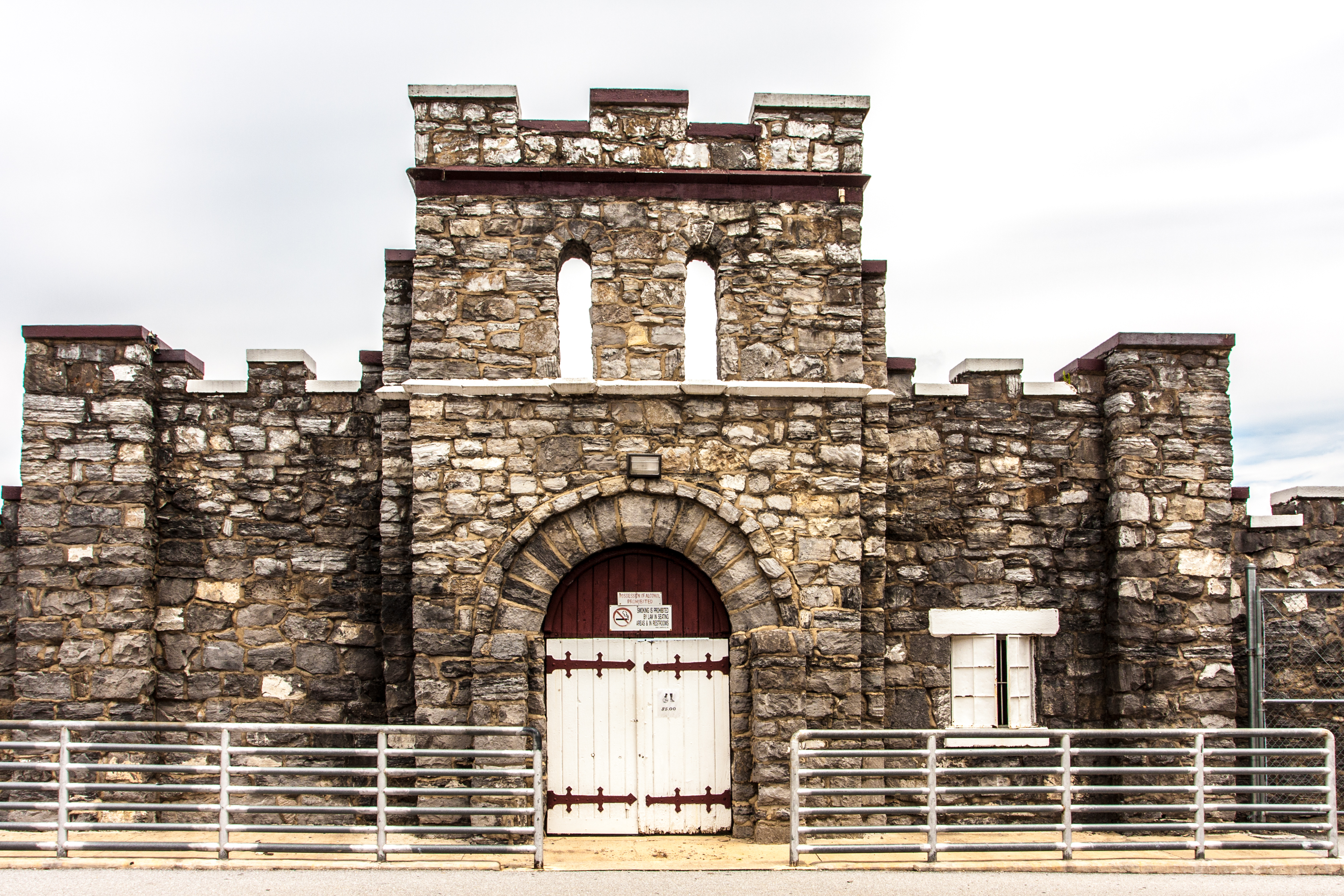
- Stadium entrance

- Location within Tennessee Location within the United States
- Location: Bristol, TN
- Coordinates: 36°34′56.71″N 82°10′59.76″W
- Built: 1934
- Architect: R.V. Arnold
- NRHP reference No.: 87001039
- Added to NRHP: June 25, 1987

Bristol Municipal Stadium, also referred to as the Stone Castle, is an athletic facility located on the campus of Bristol Tennessee High School in Bristol, Tennessee. The structure features a design that is reminiscent of Medieval Gothic architecture and has a seating capacity of approximately 8,000. The stadium currently serves as the home field of the football team of Tennessee High School. The structure was added to the National Register of Historic Places in 1987.

== History ==
Bristol Municipal Stadium was built during the New Deal by the Works Progress Administration (WPA). It is one of two WPA stadiums in Tennessee that are still in use, the other being Crump Stadium in Memphis. Construction of Bristol Municipal Stadium began in 1934 and was completed in 1936. The construction cost of $34,000 was shared between the federal government and the city of Bristol. The stadium opened on October 8, 1936.

The stadium has been the home field for football teams not only for Tennessee High School in Bristol, Tennessee, but also for Virginia High School in Bristol, Virginia, the two cities' former segregated high schools for African Americans, Slater High School in Bristol, Tennessee and Douglass High School in Bristol, Virginia, King College and Emory and Henry College.

A renovation of the facility was completed in 1986 at a cost of $500,000.

== Architecture ==
The stadium is built of rough rubble limestone obtained from a WPA project nearby. Its design was influenced by Medieval Gothic architecture, featuring arched entries, 20-foot (6.1 m) high crenellated walls, and unusual corner towers.
