= 2007 Appalachian State vs. Michigan football game =

American college football game that took place in Michigan in 2007

2007 Appalachian State vs. Michigan
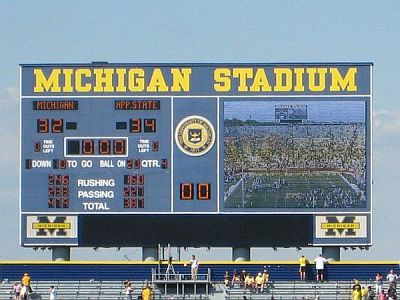
Appalachian State Mountaineers	Michigan Wolverines
(0–0)	(0–0)
34	32
Head coach: Jerry Moore	Head coach: Lloyd Carr
	AP / Coaches; 5 / 5
	1	2	3	4	Total
Appalachian State	7	21	3	3	34
Michigan	14	3	9	6	32
- Date: September 1, 2007
- Season: 2007
- Stadium: Michigan Stadium
- Location: Ann Arbor, Michigan
- Favorite: Michigan (no betting line)
- Referee: John O'Neill
- Attendance: 109,218

United States TV coverage
- Network: Big Ten Network
- Announcers: Thom Brennaman (play-by-play); Charles Davis (analyst); Charissa Thompson (sideline)

The 2007 Appalachian State vs. Michigan football game was a regular season college football game between the Appalachian State Mountaineers and Michigan Wolverines. It was held at Michigan Stadium in Ann Arbor on September 1, 2007, and was the first game of the season for both teams. The Wolverines entered the game ranked No. 5 in both major Football Bowl Subdivision (FBS) polls and media outlets considered them to be preseason favorites to win the Big Ten championship as well as possible contenders for the national championship, while the Mountaineers were ranked No. 1 in The Sports Network's Football Championship Subdivision (FCS) poll and were preseason favorites to win their third consecutive FCS national championship.

Games between FBS and FCS teams typically result in lopsided victories for the FBS team, and the Appalachian State–Michigan game was not expected to be an exception. So confident were Las Vegas sportsbooks in Michigan's chances that no betting line was issued for the game. The game was also the first to be broadcast on the then-new Big Ten Network. It began with a strong first half for Appalachian State, who held a 28–17 lead at the end of the half. Michigan regained the lead at 32–31 in the fourth quarter, but Appalachian State took the lead for a second time on a short field goal with 26 seconds left. The Mountaineers blocked a game-winning field goal attempt from Michigan at the end of regulation to secure a 34–32 win.

Immediately hailed as one of the greatest upsets in college football history, the game served as the lead story of SportsCenter and was the cover story for the following week's edition of Sports Illustrated. Appalachian State became the second FCS team to defeat a ranked FBS team, and as a result of the game Michigan dropped out of the top 25 of the AP poll entirely, marking the first time a team had fallen from the top five to out of the poll entirely as the result of a single game. In the aftermath of the game, the Associated Press amended its polling policy to make FCS teams eligible for the AP poll, which had previously been limited to FBS teams.

The Mountaineers finished the 2007 season with a 13–2 record and won a third consecutive FCS title. They also became the first FCS team to receive votes in the final AP poll, tying South Florida for the 34th overall ranking. Michigan finished their season 9–4, winning the Capital One Bowl, and ranked No. 18 in the final AP poll. A rematch in 2014 at Michigan Stadium was won decisively by the Wolverines, 52–14. The 2014 rematch was ASU's first game as an FBS school.

== Background ==
=== Divisions and subdivisions ===
The National Collegiate Athletic Association (NCAA) is split into three divisions: Division I, Division II, and Division III. According to the NCAA, Division I consists of "the largest programs that provide the most athletically related financial aid for student-athletes". Division I football is split into two subdivisions: the Football Bowl Subdivision (FBS) and the Football Championship Subdivision (FCS). USA Today notes that the FBS is considered the tier at which major Division I universities play, while the FCS is a tier in which smaller programs compete. FBS member teams are allowed to have up to 85 scholarship players, while FCS member teams are allowed to award 63 scholarships. However, FCS teams can divide their 63 scholarships by giving some players 'partial scholarships'. FBS teams vie to play in bowl games, while FCS teams aim to qualify for a postseason tournament. The two subdivisions were created in 1978, and no other Division I sports are split in such a manner. The difference between the two subdivisions is great enough that John V. Lombardi, a former chancellor at UMass, which played FCS football before moving to FBS in 2012, and a former president at FBS-level Florida and Louisiana State, said that "even a crummy team in [FBS] football has higher visibility than a great team in [FCS]".

FBS teams are allowed to schedule FCS teams, and one win against an FCS team can be counted towards their bowl-eligible status provided the FCS team meets certain scholarship requirements. FCS teams are often paid upwards of USD $1,500,000 for participating in games against FBS teams. This arrangement generally results in lopsided losses for FCS teams, but the money FCS schools earn from games against FBS teams helps fund their athletic departments, as well as offering broader exposure for their athletic programs.

=== Scheduling ===
Appalachian State had routinely scheduled FBS teams, playing against schools such as Auburn in 1999, Kansas and LSU in 2005, and NC State in 2006. They also had games against Wake Forest in every season from 1979 to 1996, as well as in 1998, 2000, and 2001, and had won six of them. The Mountaineers had not beaten an FBS team since 2000. Michigan, a historic college football power with a large fan base, had never played an FCS team. According to Appalachian State athletic director Charlie Cobb, both schools had gaps in their schedule as late as February 2007; the friendship between Mountaineers coach Jerry Moore and Wolverines coach Lloyd Carr played a key role in completing the deal. While attempting to determine the amount of money Appalachian State would be paid for playing Michigan, negotiations between the two schools reached a halt. Moore went to school officials and urged them to accept any offer Michigan gave them; he recalled telling them that "it's an opportunity game. It'll be a one-shot, once-in-a-lifetime deal to go up there and play. It's an unbelievable environment". Appalachian State ultimately settled on a $400,000 payment in return for playing against Michigan to open the 2007 season.

== Pre-game ==
Michigan was expected to handily defeat Appalachian State, who entered the game as considerable underdogs. Las Vegas sports books did not offer a betting line because they believed that it would be a mismatch. The day before the game, an Associated Press article said that the Mountaineers were "almost certain to lose badly" and "aren't expected to be anything more than sacrificial lambs". Another article predicted that Michigan would easily win, but that Michigan's inexperienced secondary could possibly be tested by quarterback Armanti Edwards. This weakness is what the Mountaineers hoped to capitalize on: they spent most of the week leading up to the game studying game film, and felt that the Michigan defense had a tendency to leave the middle of the field defenseless. On the other hand, the Mountaineers lacked the depth of the Wolverines, having 22 fewer scholarship players.

=== Appalachian State Mountaineers ===
Appalachian State was ranked as the No. 1 team in the preseason FCS poll from The Sports Network, receiving 67 out of 70 first-place votes. The team had won the previous two FCS national championships and were favorites to win a third consecutive title according to media outlets. They had also won their last 14 games, the longest in either Division I subdivision at the time. They had an overall record of 6–34–1 (.159) against major FBS teams. The Mountaineers ran a no-huddle, spread option system, which they implemented in 2005, their first championship season. Two of the major offensive weapons for the team were quarterback Armanti Edwards, who had scored 15 passing touchdowns and 15 rushing touchdowns in 2006, and running back Kevin Richardson, who had scored an FCS-record 30 rushing touchdowns in 2006. The defensive unit for the Mountaineers was helmed by safety Corey Lynch, the Mountaineer defense ranked 11th in rush defense and 35th in pass defense during the 2006 season, but the team lost five of its six best tacklers from that season, as well as defensive end Marques Murrell, who led the FCS in sacks during the 2006 season. Despite losses at the defensive line, the secondary, the team's defensive strong point, remained virtually intact from the previous season. The kicker of the Mountaineers was senior Julian Rauch, who made 10 out of 14 field goal attempts during the 2006 season.

=== Michigan Wolverines ===
Michigan entered the game as the No. 5-ranked team in both the AP poll and the Coaches' poll. Media outlets projected the team as favorites to win the Big Ten Conference, and as contenders for a national championship. Michigan featured a strong senior class of offensive tackle Jake Long, running back Mike Hart, and quarterback Chad Henne, each of whom had decided to stay in school rather than declare eligibility for the NFL draft. The players attributed their decision to several factors, such as Michigan having lost their last three games to rival Ohio State and the Wolverines' streak of three consecutive bowl losses. The three also desired to finish their college careers on a high note. Mark Schlabach of ESPN.com stated that "[the trio], along with receivers Mario Manningham and Adrian Arrington, gives Michigan what could potentially be one of the most explosive offenses in college football". Prior to the season, the team named Hart and Long as captains, along with linebacker Shawn Crable, a fifth-year senior. Michigan aimed to open the game in a three-receiver formation, which has the potential to spread the opposing defense out; Michigan coach Lloyd Carr noted that "when you have some of the skill that we have at the wide receiver positions and can spread a defense out, that's [a] positive". At the same time, Michigan was anticipated to run only a limited selection of plays from this set, to limit the ability of their upcoming opponents to develop an effective game plan against them. Michigan's defense, which led the FBS in run defense in 2006, lost seven starters from the previous season, including four All-Americans in cornerback Leon Hall and defensive linemen Alan Branch, David Harris, and LaMarr Woodley, each of whom were selected in the first two rounds of the 2007 NFL draft. Wolverines linebacker Chris Graham, a senior, expected the defense to be defined by speed, noting that each position on the defense was "loaded in speed".

== Game summary ==
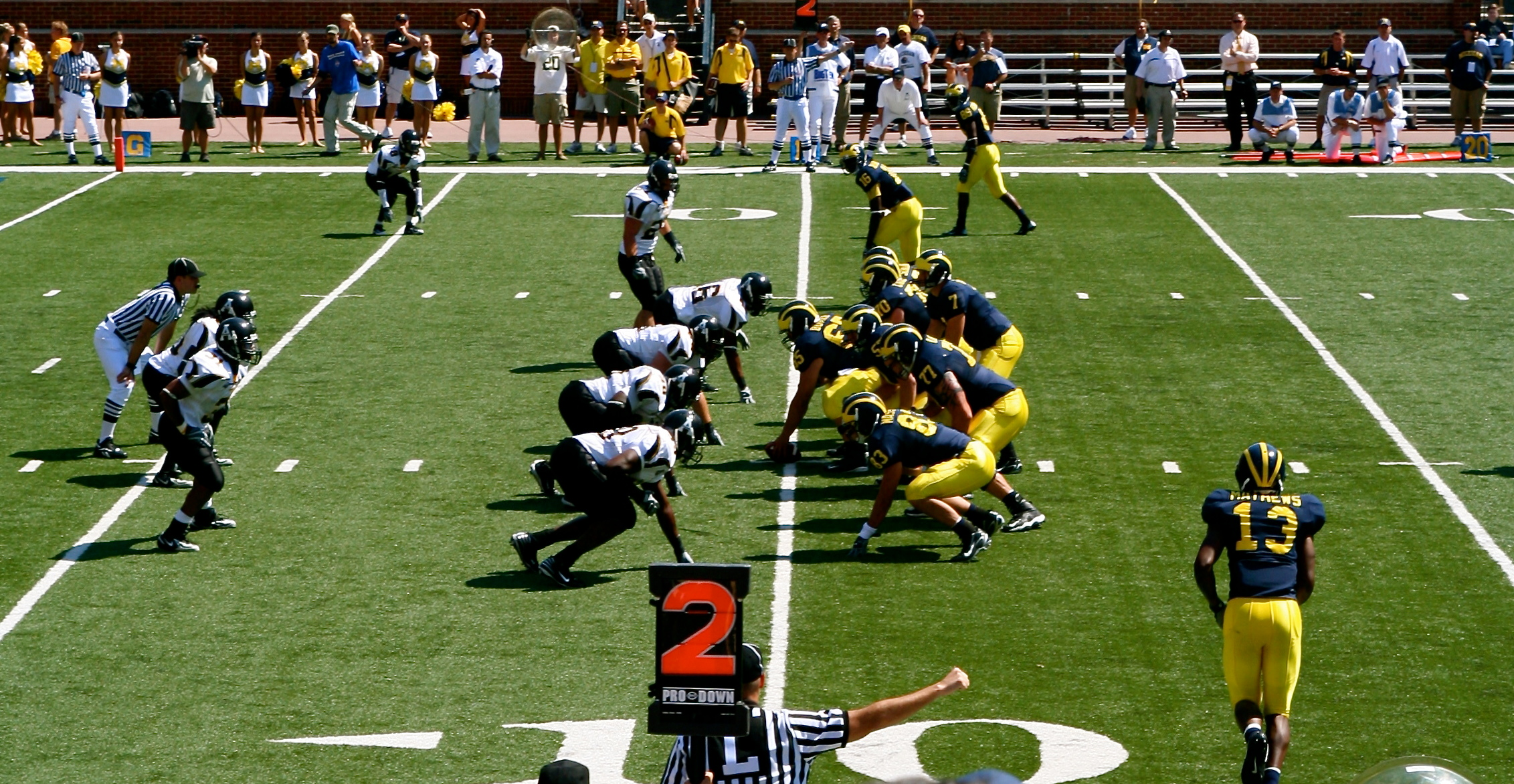
Michigan's offense lined up at the line of scrimmage against the Appalachian State defense

=== Broadcast and game notes ===
The game was the first ever to be broadcast on the then-new Big Ten Network. At the time, the network had approximately 17 million subscribers, most of which came from a deal with DirecTV. According to Mark Silverman, the president of the Big Ten Network, only a "small percentage" of Wolverine fans were able to watch it. Silverman attributed this to the fact that Comcast and Charter, two of the major cable television providers in the state of Michigan, did not carry the Big Ten Network. Thom Brennaman provided play-by-play commentary, while Charles Davis performed as the color analyst, and Charissa Thompson reported from the sidelines. The game marked Thompson's debut as a sideline analyst on any network, while Brennaman and Davis were more experienced, having covered high-profile college football games such as the 2007 Fiesta Bowl and the 2007 BCS National Championship Game for Fox Sports.

The weather during the game was clear and sunny, with temperatures in the mid-70s °F (low-20s °C) and wind heading north at 10–15 miles (16–24 kilometers) per hour. The referee, the head of the officiating team, was John O'Neill. Overall attendance was recorded as 109,218. The game kicked off at 12:07 p.m. and ended at 3:40 p.m., having lasted a total of three hours and thirty-seven minutes.

=== First quarter ===
Michigan received the ball first, with Mike Massey returning the Julian Rauch kick to the Michigan 33-yard line. After Mike Hart ran for three yards on third down and one, Chad Henne completed an 18-yard pass to Massey, followed by a 33-yard rush from Hart, pushing Michigan to the Appalachian State four-yard line. Hart ran the ball in for a touchdown on the next play, making the score 7–0 after the extra point. App State began its drive at its own 26-yard line, and gained six yards on the first two plays. On third down, Armanti Edwards completed a short pass to Dexter Jackson who outran the Michigan defense for a 68-yard touchdown to tie the game at 7. The following two drives resulted in three-and-outs for both teams, but after a short Mountaineers punt went out of bounds at the Michigan 48-yard line, the Wolverines mounted a ten-play, 52-yard drive, featuring two third-down conversions and culminating in a ten-yard touchdown pass from Henne to Greg Matthews for a 14–7 Michigan lead. App State started their drive with 3:09 left in the quarter at their own 35-yard line, completing nine plays, including two third-down conversions of their own, and driving to the Michigan 36 yard-line before the end of the quarter.

=== Second quarter ===
The scoreboard near the end of the second quarter

Following the start of the second quarter, Appalachian State ran another six plays, ending the drive with a nine-yard touchdown pass by Edwards to Hans Batichon, tying the score at 14. Michigan was forced into a three-and-out and had to punt the ball; a 17-yard return by Jackson and a 15-yard late hit penalty by Michigan set up ASU at the Michigan 37. On the fifth play of the ensuing drive, the Mountaineers scored a touchdown on another Edwards completion to Jackson on a slant route, this time for 20 yards, and giving ASU its first lead at 21–14. Michigan began its next drive at their 20-yard line and drove 40 yards in four plays, but with first down on the App State 40-yard line, the drive stalled, with Michigan gaining only five yards over the next three plays. In no man's land, the Wolverines opted to go for it on fourth down but failed to convert, turning the ball over to Appalachian State. Taking over at their own 35-yard-line, the ensuing Mountaineer drive featured nine running plays in a row, the last a quarterback keeper by Edwards on third down and goal from the six-yard-line, who dove past Michigan defenders for a touchdown and a stunning 28–14 Mountaineers lead with 2:15 remaining in the half. The Wolverines answered with a 63-yard drive to the Appalachian five-yard line, ultimately settling for a Jason Gingell field goal with 23 seconds left, cutting Appalachian State's lead to eleven points. After the Mountaineers kneeled to end the first half, both teams ran to the locker room to some booing from the home crowd.

=== Third quarter ===
Appalachian State returned the opening kickoff of the second half to its own 36-yard line, but Michigan cornerback Morgan Trent intercepted an Edwards throw on the second play of the drive. Michigan moved the ball 15 yards to the ASU 25-yard line before Gingell's 42-yard field goal decreased the Mountaineer lead to eight points. Appalachian State, starting on its own 24-yard line, then drove 64 yards in 11 plays; receiver Brian Quick dropped a wide open pass in the end zone on third down, forcing ASU to settle for a Rauch 31-yard field goal to restore the 11-point lead at 31–20. After the ensuing kickoff, Michigan ran four plays before Brandon Minor fumbled, with App State linebacker Pierre Banks recovering at the Michigan 28-yard line. However, App State did not advance the ball and Rauch missed a 46-yard field goal attempt. Michigan went three-and-out on their next drive and punted, but an Edwards fumble on the fourth play of the following Mountaineer drive was recovered by Michigan linebacker John Thompson at the ASU 31-yard line. Michigan drove 31 yards over six plays, scoring a touchdown on a four-yard run by Hart. The Wolverines went for a two-point conversion, but Henne dropped the snap and ultimately failed to convert, leaving the score 31–26 in favor of Appalachian State. Appalachian State received the kickoff at its own 26-yard line with 19 seconds left in the third quarter, and the quarter ended following a six-yard completion by Edwards to Batichon.

=== Fourth quarter ===
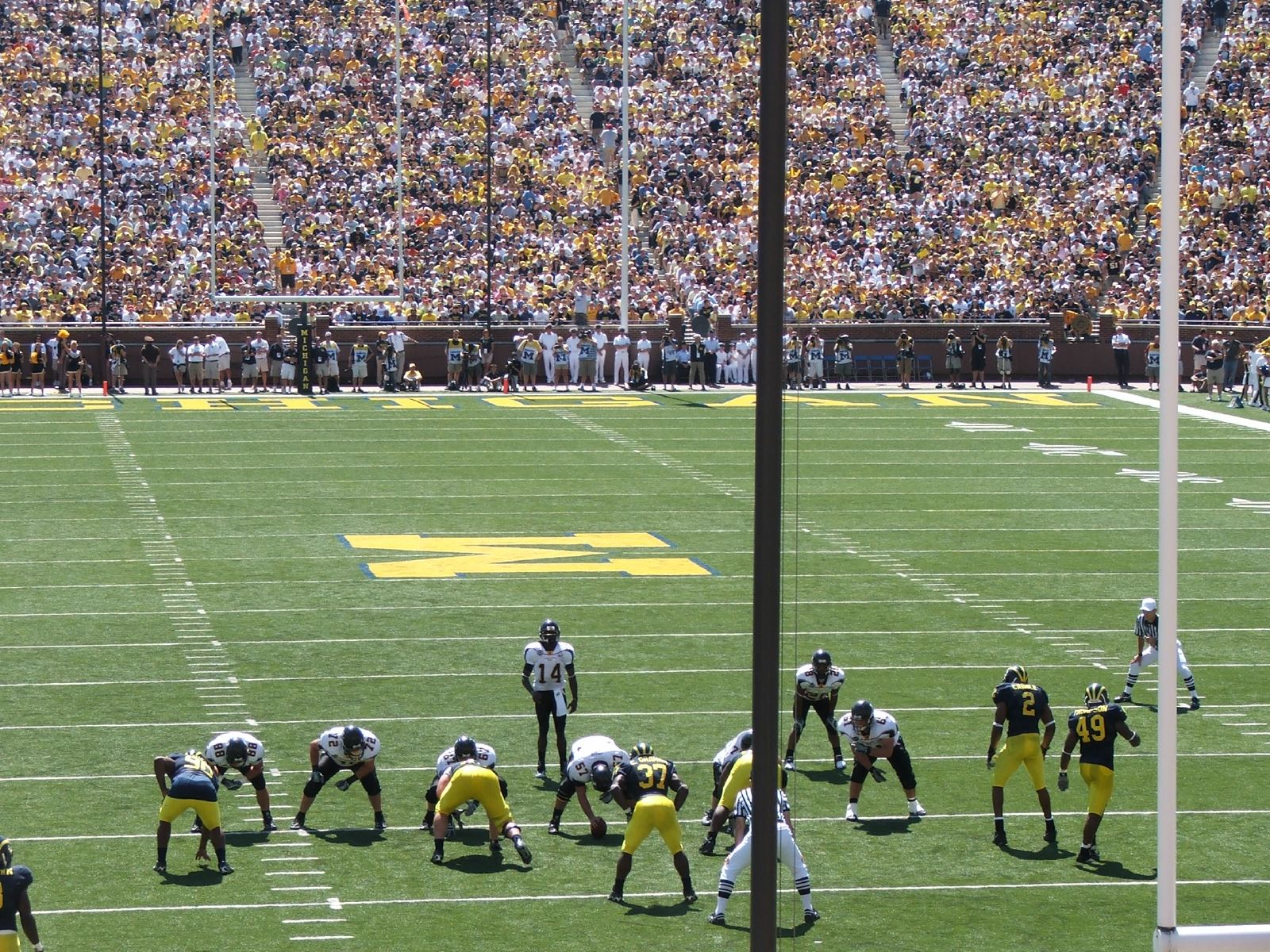
Appalachian State lined up against the Michigan defense

Appalachian State continued its drive but was forced to punt after being stopped on third down. Michigan began at the App State 34-yard line, but a Henne pass was intercepted by Mountaineers defensive back Leonard Love on the fourth play of the drive, and returned 26 yards to the ASU 41-yard line. The Mountaineers went three-and-out and punted, and Michigan mounted a nine-play, 43-yard drive from their own 24-yard line to the ASU 33-yard line. However, Henne's pass on 4th-and-5 fell incomplete, turning the ball over to App State, who was again quickly forced to punt. After Michigan returned the punt to their own 46-yard line, on the next play Hart eluded several defenders on a 54-yard touchdown run, giving the Wolverines a 32–31 lead with 4:36 left; another Michigan failed two-point conversion attempt kept the margin at one point. Edwards was immediately picked off on the drive's first play by Brandon Englemon at the ASU 43-yard line. Michigan, however, was unable to extend the lead, running five plays before Gingell's 43-yard field goal was blocked, and App State took over for likely a final chance to win the game on their own 27-yard line with 1:37 left and no timeouts. On the first play, Edwards scrambled for a first down; after a failed trick play lost yards, Edwards found T. J. Courman, who eluded a defender for a 20-yard gain to the Michigan 40-yard line. Three plays later, Edwards rolled out and threw across his body, completing it to CoCo Hillary, who ran down to the Wolverine six-yard line for a gain of nearly 30 yards. After Michigan called timeout, and with no timeouts of its own, App State elected to attempt a Rauch field goal from 24 yards out on first-and-goal with 30 seconds left. The attempt was good, giving Appalachian State a 34–32 lead but leaving 26 seconds on the clock. Michigan began at its own 34-yard line after a short kickoff; on second down, Mario Manningham beat his defender down the field and hauled in a 46-yard pass at the ASU 20-yard line with six seconds left. Gingell, Michigan's senior placekicker in his first ever game attempting field goals for the Wolverines, had a final chance to win the game for Michigan on a 37-yard attempt. The kick was blocked by safety Corey Lynch, who picked up the ball and returned the ball all the way inside the Michigan 10-yard line, running out the clock and securing the shocking 34–32 Mountaineer win.

David Jackson and Steve Brown described the final play on Appalachian State's radio broadcast thusly:

Jackson: 37-yard field goal – this is it. This is it right here. Ginsell [sic] ready, snap's good, the hold-
Brown: Blocked! Ohh! Ohh!
Jackson: The kick is blocked! The Mountaineers are going to try to take it down the field to the Big House!
Brown: It's yard sale! Yard sale in the Big House!
Jackson: 30, 20, 15, 10 – The Mountaineers have just beat the Michigan Wolverines! The Mountaineers of Appalachian State have just beaten the Michigan Wolverines in the Big House! Oh, my!
Brown: Unbelievable!
Jackson: It is Appalachian State Nation; we just beat the Wolverines in the Big House! Oh, my goodness! A second blocked kick in the fourth quarter, and the Michigan Wolverines are out of here!

Thom Brennaman described the final play on Big Ten Network:

Brennaman: Here we go. They're gonna kick the field goal. It'll be Jason Gingell out of the hold of Meskó. Good snap. Good hold. AND THE KICK IS BLOCKED! APPALACHIAN STATE HAS STUNNED THE COLLEGE FOOTBALL WORLD! ONE OF THE GREATEST UPSETS IN SPORTS HISTORY! BLOCKED BY COREY LYNCH!

=== Scoring summary ===
Scoring summary

Quarter	Time	Drive			Team	Scoring information	Score	
Quarter	Time	Plays	Yards	TOP	Team	Scoring information	Appalachian State	Michigan
1	12:31	6	66	2:29	Michigan	Mike Hart 4-yard touchdown run, Jason Gingell kick good	0	7
1	10:55	3	68	1:36	Appalachian State	Dexter Jackson 68-yard touchdown reception from Armanti Edwards, Julian Rauch kick good	7	7
1	3:16	10	52	3:38	Michigan	Greg Matthews 10-yard touchdown reception from Chad Henne, Jason Gingell kick good	7	14
2	13:35	11	65	4:41	Appalachian State	Hans Batichon 9-yard touchdown reception from Armanti Edwards, Julian Rauch kick good	14	14
2	9:47	5	37	2:15	Appalachian State	Dexter Jackson 20-yard touchdown reception from Armanti Edwards, Julian Rauch kick good	21	14
2	2:15	9	65	4:38	Appalachian State	Armanti Edwards 6-yard touchdown run, Julian Rauch kick good	28	14
2	0:16	10	63	1:59	Michigan	22-yard field goal by Jason Gingell	28	17
3	12:57	5	14	1:13	Michigan	42-yard field goal by Jason Gingell	28	20
3	8:17	11	64	4:40	Appalachian State	31-yard field goal by Julian Rauch	31	20
3	0:24	6	31	2:04	Michigan	Mike Hart 4-yard touchdown run, 2-point run failed	31	26
4	4:36	1	54	0:15	Michigan	Mike Hart 54-yard touchdown run, 2-point run failed	31	32
4	0:26	7	69	1:11	Appalachian State	24-yard field goal by Julian Rauch	34	32
"TOP" = time of possession. For other American football terms, see Glossary of American football.							34	32

== Statistical summary ==
Statistical comparison
	Appalachian State	Michigan
1st downs	19	23
Total yards	387	479
Passing yards	227	233
Rushing yards	160	246
Penalties	7/45	7/56
3rd down conversions	7/13	7/15
Turnovers	3	2
Time of possession	31:12	28:48

Appalachian State recorded 227 yards through the air, while Michigan finished with 233 yards. Michigan finished with significantly more rushing yards, recording 246 rushing yards as opposed to the 160 rushing yards gained by Appalachian State. In total, the Wolverines recorded 479 total yards of offense, while Appalachian State recorded 387 total yards. The Wolverines recorded 23 first downs, four more than the Mountaineers, while Appalachian State turned the ball over three times, one more than Michigan. Both teams recorded seven penalties, but Michigan recorded more penalty yards. Appalachian State held the edge in time of possession, holding the ball for 31 minutes and 12 seconds; Michigan held the ball for 28 minutes and 48 seconds.

Appalachian State quarterback Armanti Edwards completed 17 of 23 passes for 227 yards, three touchdowns, and two interceptions while averaging 9.9 yards per throw. Kevin Richardson led the team in rushing yards, running the ball 24 times for 88 yards, and Edwards was second on the team with 17 rushes for 62 yards and one touchdown. Edwards accounted for all four Mountaineer touchdowns. Dexter Jackson led the team in receiving, catching three passes for 98 yards and two touchdowns; he also had one carry for 19 yards.

Michigan quarterback Chad Henne completed 19 of 37 passes for 233 yards, with an average of 6.3 yards per throw; he threw one touchdown and one interception. Mike Hart, who missed almost two quarters due to a thigh injury, led Michigan in rushing, recording 188 yards and three touchdowns on 23 carries. Greg Matthews led the Wolverines in receiving, accounting for 68 yards and one touchdown on seven catches.

Pierre Banks led the Mountaineers in tackles, recording 12 total tackles. Banks also recorded the only sack for the Mountaineers and recovered a fumble. Corey Lynch finished second with 11 tackles, as well as blocking a kick. Leonard Love recorded the only interception for the Mountaineers. For Michigan, Shawn Crable led the team with 10 tackles. Crable also forced a fumble and recorded 1.5 sacks. Chris Graham finished with 9 tackles, the second-most on the Wolverines. Brandent Englemon and Morgan Trent each intercepted a pass, while Tim Jamison, Terrance Taylor, and Will Johnson received full or partial credit for sacks.

== Aftermath ==
=== Appalachian State ===
Appalachian State was unanimously selected as the No. 1 team in the FCS football poll in the week after their victory against Michigan. Although several voters in the AP poll stated they would like to vote for Appalachian State, the Mountaineers were ineligible to receive votes because the poll was only limited to FBS teams; in response, the AP amended their policy the following week to allow FCS teams to receive votes in the AP poll. The Mountaineers received 19 points in the week 3 edition of the AP poll and 5 points in the week 4 edition. The team also extended their winning streak to 17 games before losing to the Wofford Terriers in week 5. Appalachian State lost to rival Georgia Southern in week 7, dropping them to 5–2 and 2–2 in the Southern Conference (SoCon), which placed them in a poor position to repeat for a third consecutive time as conference champions. However, the Mountaineers won all of their remaining regular season games to finish 9–2, and their 5–2 Southern Conference record was good enough to earn a share of the SoCon conference title with Wofford, but the Terriers claimed the conference's automatic bid. As an at-large bid, the team scored a close win over James Madison (28–27) and then defeated Eastern Washington (38–35) in the first two rounds of the FCS playoffs. Appalachian State easily defeated Richmond (55–35) in the semifinals and Delaware (49–21) – including future Super Bowl XLVII-winning quarterback Joe Flacco – in the championship game, winning their third consecutive FCS National Championship. They became the first team to win three consecutive FCS titles, and the first Division I football team to win three consecutive titles since the Army Cadets, who had won three straight titles from 1944 to 1946. At the end of the season, the Mountaineers became the first FCS team to receive votes in the final AP poll. They received five votes, which placed Appalachian State at a tie for 34th overall with South Florida.

In addition, 15 years later and after joining the Football Bowl Subdivision, the Mountaineers recorded the school's second victory over an opponent ranked in the top 10 of the AP Poll with a 17–14 win at Kyle Field over Texas A&M after the Aggies entered the game ranked No. 6.

=== Michigan ===
The loss to Appalachian State was Michigan's first against an FCS team. It also effectively ended Michigan's chances of winning a national championship. The Wolverines dropped out of the top 25 entirely on the AP poll the following week, the first time a team had missed the top 25 in the poll the week after they were in the top 10. Jerry Palm called this game "about the worst loss a Top 5 team has had". In their next game, Michigan lost to Oregon 39–7, the largest margin of defeat for Michigan since 1968. Following the loss to Oregon, Michigan won their next eight games, leading the team to rank as high as No. 13 in the AP poll. After Michigan lost their final two games, ending the regular season with an 8–4 record, they dropped off the poll entirely. After Michigan's season-ending loss to Ohio State in The Game, Lloyd Carr announced he would retire as the team's coach after their bowl game. The Wolverines received an invitation to the Capital One Bowl, where they defeated Florida 41–35 to finish their season 9–4. Following their win in the Capital One Bowl, Michigan finished at No. 18 in the final AP poll.

=== Media reaction ===
Thom Brennaman immediately hailed the game as one of the greatest upsets in the history of sports; in their postgame interview, Charissa Thompson told coach Jerry Moore that it was "one of the greatest upsets in college football history". Many media outlets described it as one of, if not the greatest, upsets in the history of college football. The win marked the first time an FCS team had beaten a ranked FBS program. Dan Wetzel of Yahoo! Sports wrote that:

"This game was supposed to be the prime example of what had gone wrong in money hungry college football. The powers that be had expanded the season a couple years back, adding an extra game so big schools could bring in cream-puff opponents while collecting millions in revenue. Michigan had never played a I-AA opponent in its history. Now we know why, the Wolverines were ducking them. Instead of an easy tune-up for Michigan, Appalachian State leaves with its most profound victory ever and a check for $400,000 that was supposed to be their pay for getting punished".

Sports Illustrated writer Stewart Mandel wrote that he felt "utterly unqualified" to put the game into perspective, and said "there's no logical reason whatsoever this should have happened. But it did. And it wasn't the slightest bit fluky". He also expressed disappointment that he would not be able to vote for the Mountaineers in his AP poll ballot, explaining that "it may well turn out that Michigan was grossly overrated, but all I know is this: There will not be 25 other teams that accomplish more this opening weekend than Appalachian State did Saturday. There won't even be five". Pat Forde of ESPN.com called it "the most astonishing college football result I can remember", saying that "we'll still be talking about it a few decades from now. Especially in the locker rooms of every huge underdog, where they'll say, 'if Appalachian State can beat Michigan, why can't we shock the world, too?' ". He felt the upset was particularly impressive because upsets of such a magnitude do not happen often in college football. The New York Times writer Viv Bernstein called the game "one of the biggest upsets in college football history" and called it "a stunning upset by any measure". The game was the lead story on SportsCenter and was the cover story for the following week's edition of Sports Illustrated; Appalachian State wide receiver Dexter Jackson was featured on the cover, which has the headline "Alltime Upset: Appalachian State Stuns No. 5 Michigan".

In 2012, Jerry Hinnen of CBS Sports described it as "the biggest upset of the past five years of college football", and described it as having "set the table" for an "epically chaotic" 2007 season as well as "four years' worth of headline-making upsets to follow". Dennis Dodd of CBS Sports said in 2012 that "we may never see its likes again". He said that the game "reminded us why the college game is the best", but felt that such a result would become more unlikely in the future, as many conferences are moving to increase to nine conference games, reducing the need to play FCS teams. In 2019, Sports Illustrated ranked the game as the greatest upset in college football history.

Since Appalachian State's victory, four other FCS teams have defeated ranked FBS teams. In 2010, James Madison defeated 13th-ranked Virginia Tech 21–16. In 2013, Eastern Washington beat 25th-ranked Oregon State, 49–46. The year also saw North Dakota State record a 24–21 victory over unranked Kansas State, the defending Big 12 champions. On September 17, 2016, North Dakota State defeated No. 13 Iowa 23–21 in a game played in Kinnick Stadium. On September 4, 2021, Montana defeated No. 20 Washington 13–7 at Husky Stadium.

=== Reaction in Boone and on other campuses ===
Just minutes after the game ended, Appalachian State students began celebrating on the two main streets in Boone, North Carolina: King Street and Rivers Street. The group eventually advanced to Kidd Brewer Stadium, Appalachian State's home field, and tore down one of the goalposts. The students proceeded to carry the goalpost over a mile before depositing it in the front yard of the school's chancellor, Kenneth E. Peacock. He was fine with this, saying "as good as today was for Appalachian State, they can take it up there and put it down. I can't wait to get there and see it". Several students jumped nude into the duck pond behind ASU's dining hall, a campus tradition for celebrating big football victories. When the team returned to their stadium in buses at 11:00 p.m., they were greeted by a crowd of thousands of students and fans. It took the team 20 minutes to get from their buses to the locker room due to the crowd. The celebration in Boone was not limited to Appalachian State's campus; the Boone Mall was "flooded" with cars, and a sports apparel shop carrying ASU gear, Sports Fanatic, reported that sales were seven times higher than normal.

In Ann Arbor, Michigan, the reaction was far different. The Ann Arbor News reported that the Michigan fans who attended the game were "shell-shocked". Appalachian State's win also proved popular among fans of Michigan's rivals. The Associated Press reported that, following the end of Ohio State's 38–6 home victory against the Youngstown State Penguins, the Ohio Stadium aired the final minutes of the Appalachian State–Michigan game on the stadium's big screen; although most of the fans had already left, the outcome "elicited a large roar" from the remaining attendees. Similarly, The Daily Collegian reported that as Penn State was closing a 59–0 home victory over FIU, the update "twenty seconds to play fourth quarter, Appalachian State 34, Michigan 32" was announced over the stadium's loudspeakers. The student section and several Penn State players quickly crowded inside of Beaver Stadium to watch the closing seconds on in-stadium televisions; when the final, potentially game-winning Michigan kick was blocked by Appalachian State, they "converged into a mosh pit" in celebration.

The Detroit Free Press reported that the loudest cheers during Michigan State's home victory against UAB came when the scoreboard displayed the final score of the Appalachian State vs. Michigan game; to conclude his postgame press conference, Michigan State defensive coordinator Pat Narduzzi stated: "and Michigan lost, too". The Ohio State locker room erupted into a "roar" after the players learned of Michigan's loss. Conversely, Michigan State running back Javon Ringer expressed disappointment at the game's result, saying "I kinda really wanted [Michigan] to be undefeated for us". Ohio State head coach Jim Tressel gave a similar reaction, saying that "I'm never glad when a conference opponent loses outside of your game with them... You're always rooting for your brethren in the Big Ten". ESPN.com reported that in the hours after the game, "at least one street vendor was doing brisk business selling freshly minted Mountaineers T-shirts near the Ohio State campus", while stores near the campus were "swamped with requests for gear bearing the Mountaineers' gold and black colors and logo", primarily from Ohio State fans who were rejoicing over their rival's defeat. Appalachian State's campus bookstore received a large number of phone calls from people wanting to buy gear, many of them from Ohio, but were unable to sell them in large quantities due to a state law prohibiting university bookstores from selling items to people who are not students, faculty, or alumni.

=== Rematch ===
In 2011, Appalachian State and Michigan agreed to play a rematch, scheduled for 2014 to be the season-opener for both teams. Appalachian State was paid $850,000 to play this game. Michigan's athletic director, Dave Brandon, felt a rematch would be an excellent way to gain attention for Michigan football and said "the networks were fighting over who gets to televise that game". Jerry Moore said that "to have the University of Michigan invite us back is the ultimate compliment for us as a program and a university. We're grateful for the opportunity to have a new generation of players experience a gameday at the Big House and to test themselves against college football's all-time winningest program". Appalachian State played their first year of football in the FBS in 2014 and joined the Sun Belt Conference (SBC) as full members. The rematch was much different this time around, with Michigan beating Appalachian State 52–14; Appalachian State never held a lead in the game.
