= Appalachian State Mountaineers football =

College football program for Appalachian State University

2026 Appalachian State Mountaineers football team
- First season: 1928; 98 years ago
- Athletic director: Doug Gillin
- Head coach: Dowell Loggains; 2nd season, 5–8 (.385)
- Location: Boone, North Carolina
- Stadium: Kidd Brewer Stadium (capacity: 40,168)
- NCAA division: Division I FBS
- Conference: Sun Belt
- Division: East
- Colors: Black and gold
- All-time record: 674–369–29 (.642)
- Bowl record: 7–2 (.778)

NCAA Division I FCS championships
- 2005, 2006, 2007

Conference championships
- NSC: 1931, 1937, 1939, 1948, 1950, 1954 SoCon: 1986, 1987, 1991, 1995, 1999, 2005, 2006, 2007, 2008, 2009, 2010, 2012 SBC: 2016, 2017, 2018, 2019

Division championships
- SBC East: 2018, 2019, 2021
- Rivalries: Georgia Southern (rivalry); Marshall (rivalry); Coastal Carolina (rivalry); Charlotte; Western Carolina (rivalry; dormant)
- Fight song: Hi Hi Yikas
- Mascot: Yosef
- Marching band: Marching Mountaineers
- Outfitter: Nike
- Website: appstatesports.com

The Appalachian State Mountaineers football team is the intercollegiate American football team representing Appalachian State University in Boone, North Carolina. The Mountaineers have competed in the Football Bowl Subdivision (FBS) and the Sun Belt Conference since 2014. Appalachian plays its home games in Kidd Brewer Stadium, named after former head coach Kidd Brewer, whose 1937 squad was unbeaten and unscored upon during the regular season, outscoring opponents 206–0.

Through its history, the Appalachian State football program has won some 661 games, claimed three NCAA Championships, and appeared in either a bowl game or, alternatively, the Division I FCS playoffs, some 35 times. The Mountaineers have 22 conference championships and have one of the nation's best home field advantages by winning percentage. The program boasts a back-to-back Walter Payton Award winner, Armanti Edwards, the first ever to win in consecutive years (2008, 2009). Appalachian's all-time winning percentage of .646 ranks 16th among all programs.

The Mountaineers competed in the Football Championship Subdivision (FCS) from its founding in 1978 to 2013. They won three straight national championships from 2005 to 2007, the first FCS team to do so since the playoffs began in 1978. Appalachian is also the first Division I program to win three consecutive national championships since Army accomplished the feat from 1944 to 1946, and the first Division I school in the modern era to claim three straight undisputed national titles. When FCS Appalachian State defeated No. 5 Michigan in 2007, it was the first time an FCS team had defeated any ranked FBS program. Appalachian State then tallied votes itself and became the first FCS team to receive votes in a final Associated Press (AP) college football poll. The Mountaineers received five points in the poll.

Appalachian State moved on from FCS to FBS in 2014, and has already enjoyed AP Top 25 rankings during several of its seasons (e.g., 2018, 2019, 2020) in FBS. The Mountaineers finished the 2019 season with a final AP poll ranking at No. 19 (and Coaches No. 18) after winning its fifth straight bowl game, third straight Sun Belt Championship, and statement victories over both UNC and USC in out-of-conference matchups at Chapel Hill and Columbia. With a 7–2 record in modern NCAA-sanctioned bowl games, Appalachian has the highest bowl winning percentage of any football program to have played in five or more.

== History ==
=== Early history (1928–1970) ===
Appalachian State began playing organized football in 1928. The coach that first year was Graydon Eggers. The Mountaineers competed as an independent before joining the National Association of Intercollegiate Athletics (NAIA) North State Conference as a charter member in 1931. Kidd Brewer was the head coach of the Mountaineers from 1935 to 1938, leading the team to two postseason bowl games. Brewer's 1937 squad is best remembered for going unbeaten and unscored upon during the regular season, outscoring opponents 206–0 before losing a postseason game to Southern Miss, 7–0. Appalachian found continued success under coach E. C. Duggins (1947–50 and 1952–55). During Duggins' eight years as coach, the Mountaineers claimed three more North State Conference championships and played in seven bowl games. The Mountaineers again competed as an independent from 1968 to 1971 before joining the Southern Conference.

Jim Duncan served as Appalachian State's head coach from 1960 to 1964, compiling a 31–15–2 record. Duncan was succeeded by Carl Messere, who compiled a 34–26–1 record from 1965 to 1970.

=== Jim Brakefield era (1971–1979) ===
Wofford head coach Jim Brakefield was hired as Appalachian State's head football coach in 1971. He led the Mountaineers into the Southern Conference in his first season. Brakefield led the Mountaineers to three losing seasons in four years en route to a 47–48–4 record at Appalachian State, however, a 3–8 campaign in 1979 resulted in his dismissal. However, Brakefield's 1975 team won impressive victories over Wake Forest (19–17) and South Carolina (35–34) in 1975.

=== Mike Working era (1980–1982) ===
Mike Working served as the 16th head football coach in Appalachian State football history from 1980 to 1982. Under Working, the Mountaineers compiled a record of 13–18–2 and never were able to sustain consistency. Working was fired following back to back seven-loss seasons in 1981 and 1982.

=== Mack Brown (1983) ===
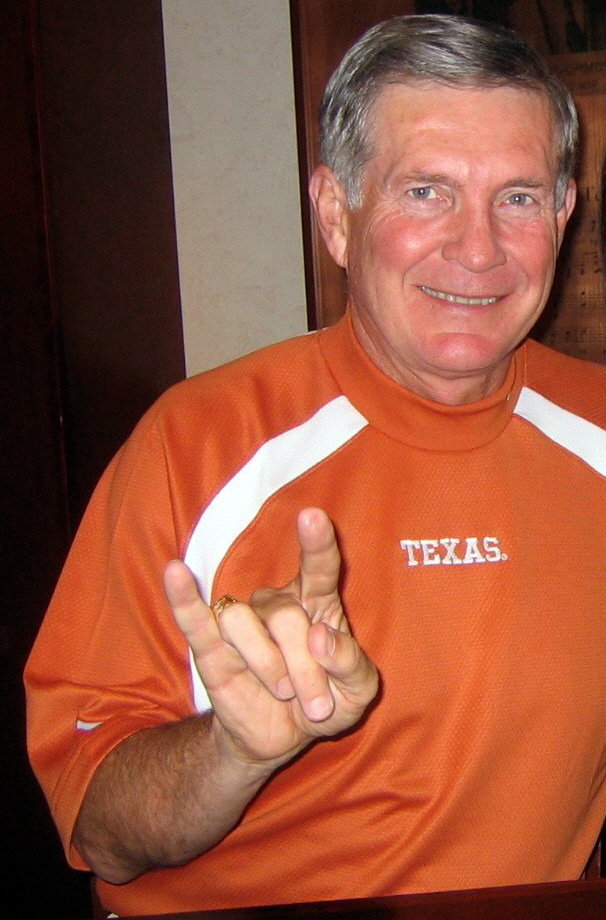
Coach Brown

Mack Brown was hired as Appalachian State's head coach in 1983, his first such role. Brown previously served as LSU's quarterbacks coach and led Appalachian State to a 6–5 record in his only season.

In December 1983, he was seriously considered for the head coaching position at LSU which had been vacated after Jerry Stovall was fired, but the position instead went to Miami Dolphins defensive coordinator Bill Arnsparger. However, Brown chose to leave Appalachian State to accept the position of offensive coordinator at Oklahoma under head coach Barry Switzer.

=== Sparky Woods era (1984–1988) ===
Following Brown's departure, Appalachian State promoted assistant coach Sparky Woods to head coach. Appalachian State won the first of nine Southern Conference championships in 1986 under Woods, who also led the Mountaineers into the playoffs for the first time that year. Another conference championship and playoff appearance followed in 1987. Woods won the Wallace Wade coach of the Year Award three straight years in 1985, 1986, and 1987, becoming the only coach in conference history to do so. Woods, who compiled a 38–19–2 record at Appalachian State, left to accept the head coaching position at South Carolina after five seasons.

=== Jerry Moore era (1989–2012) ===
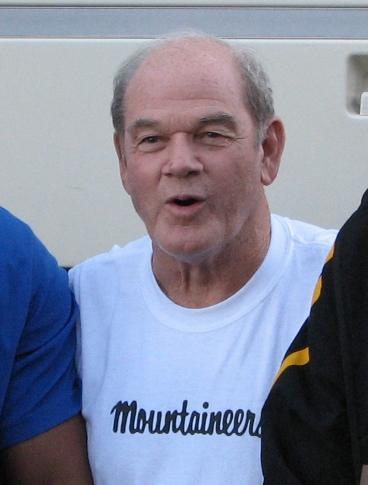
Coach Moore

Arkansas assistant coach Jerry Moore was hired as the Mountaineer's 19th coach in 1989. Moore is the winningest coach in conference history, and under his leadership the Mountaineers won seven conference championships. In addition, the Mountaineers posted 19 winning campaigns to go with one losing season during his tenure, allowing Moore to claim Southern Conference Coach of the Year honors a record six times. He was also the 2006 recipient of the Eddie Robinson Award, presented to the division's most outstanding coach. Under the stewardship of Moore, players such as two-time Buck Buchanan Award winner Dexter Coakley have gone on to play in the National Football League.

Appalachian State became the first team since the playoffs began in 1978 to win three straight national titles in 2005, 2006, and 2007, and the first team to accomplish the feat since Army in 1944, 1945, and 1946. They are also the first Division I school in modern times to claim three straight undisputed national titles.

On September 1, 2007, in what was hailed as one of the biggest upsets in American sports history, the Mountaineers shocked the fifth-ranked Michigan Wolverines, 34–32. Most people predicted that Michigan was going to win by a large margin—in fact, the unofficial odds were that Michigan was going to win by 33 points. The win helped Appalachian State become the first FCS team to ever receive votes in the final Associated Press (AP) college football poll on January 8, 2008. The Mountaineers received five points in the poll, tying South Florida for 34th. The conclusion of the 2008 season saw quarterback Armanti Edwards win Appalachian's first Walter Payton Award, presented annually to the most outstanding offensive player.

On December 2, 2012, after a first-round home playoff loss to Illinois State, athletics director Charlie Cobb announced that Moore would not return for the 2013 season. According to a press release issued by the ASU athletic department, Cobb stated that he and Moore agreed after the end of the 2011 season that the 2012 season would be Moore's last as head coach, but chose not to make an announcement until that time. However, several days later, Moore claimed that there had been a communication gap, and that he had wanted to coach for one more season (i.e., 2013).

=== Scott Satterfield era (2013–2018) ===
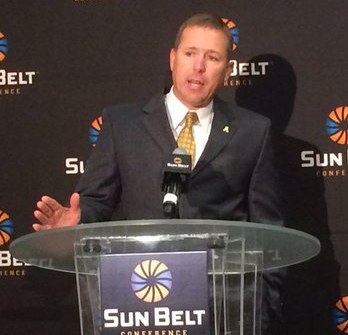
Coach Satterfield

On December 14, 2012, Scott Satterfield was named head coach of the Appalachian State football program. Satterfield had spent 15 seasons as an assistant in the Mountaineers program. As the offensive coordinator, he was responsible for much of the program's success.

In 2013, the Mountaineers began a two-year transition from the FCS to college football's premier FBS level. Because of this, the program was declared ineligible for FCS postseason play. Appalachian State's first year of FBS play would come in 2014 as a member of the Sun Belt Conference. However, per NCAA rules, the Mountaineers would not be eligible for the FBS post-season until 2015.

The first game of App State's inaugural FBS season was a rematch of the 2007 Appalachian State vs. Michigan football game. However, this time, the Michigan Wolverines won in a 52–14 blowout. The Mountaineers had their first home game of the season the following week in a win against Campbell. App State would lose its next four contests. After a 1–5 start, the Mountaineers rallied and won the final six games of their 2014 season. The team finished 7–5 overall (6–2 Sun) with a third place conference finish in their first season as a member of the Sun Belt Conference.

Appalachian State opened the 2015 season with a 49–0 pounding of Howard before losing to Clemson. After their 1–1 start, the Mountaineers won six straight but fell short to the eventual Sun Belt champion, Arkansas State, on November 5. The team rallied, finished the regular season 10–2 and received a bid to play in the Camellia Bowl against an 8–4 Ohio. The Mountaineers overcame their opposition 31–29 becoming the first team in Sun Belt history to win 11 games in one season. This win was also historic as it marked the first time a former FCS team won a bowl game in their first season of bowl eligibility.

On November 24, 2015, Miami confirmed rumors that they had scheduled a home-and-home series with Appalachian State. The first game was played in Kidd Brewer Stadium on September 17, 2016, and marked the Mountaineers' first home game against a power five opponent in modern history. The second game was played in Sun Life Stadium on September 11, 2021, with Miami narrowly winning 25–23.

In 2016, the Mountaineers finished with a 10–3 record.

In 2018, Appalachian State was ranked in the FBS for the first time in its history after starting out 5–1 in the 2018 season; its only recorded loss was to Penn State in an overtime game. They would promptly lose their next game and their ranking. The Mountaineers would end the 2018 season as Sun Belt Conference Champions. Satterfield would be named Sun Belt Conference Coach of the Year. It was the Mountaineers' 3rd Conference championship in a row and their first outright championship in the inaugural Sun Belt Championship game hosted in Boone on December 1, 2018. On December 4, 2018, Scott Satterfield was confirmed to be the next head coach of the Louisville Cardinals football program. Assistant Head Coach Mark Ivey would be named interim Head Coach and would go on to coach the Mountaineers for the 2018 R+L Carriers New Orleans Bowl win over Middle Tennessee State University Blue Raiders, 43–13. Ivey would not be retained as head coach of the Mountaineers. The Mountaineers ended their season 11–2, winning a fourth consecutive bowl game and finishing as 3-peat Sun Belt champions.

=== Eliah Drinkwitz (2019) ===
Eliah Drinkwitz was hired by Appalachian State on December 13, 2018. He was previously the offensive coordinator for NC State.

After a 12–1 regular season including a dramatic last-second win (on a blocked field goal) over Mack Brown's in-state flagship UNC Tar Heels program and a win over Louisiana in the Sun Belt Championship Game for a fourth consecutive Sun Belt championship, Drinkwitz left after just one season to become the new head coach at Missouri.

=== Shawn Clark era (2019–2024) ===
Shawn Clark was hired as the 22nd head coach in program history on December 13, 2019. Clark, a 1998 graduate of the university, played under Moore and coached under Satterfield as well as Drinkwitz. He led the Mountaineers to a 31–17 victory over UAB Blazers in the New Orleans Bowl. Clark's first full season as head coach of the Mountaineers was met with complications from the COVID-19 pandemic, which caused many changes to schedules and football operations around the country. The team persevered and Clark finished 9–3 and lead the team in the inaugural Myrtle Beach Bowl to defeat the North Texas Mean Green with a dominating performance by the offense, 56–28. Clark had thus led the Mountaineers to their 5th and 6th consecutive bowl wins since Appalachian State joined the FBS tier of Division I.

On September 10, 2022, Clark led the Mountaineers to a 17–14 victory over 6th ranked Texas A&M, the programs second win against a top 10 ranked opponent, and first since Michigan in 2007. This victory helped App State secure the school's first visit from College GameDay. However, the season ultimately turned out to be a disappointment for the program, as they missed bowl eligibility for the first time since their move to the FBS.

Shawn Clark started the 2023 Appalachian State season 3–4, with a double overtime lose to UNC-Chapel Hill and two games by a field goal to end the game versus Wyoming and Coastal Carolina. The Mountaineers rebounded winning their next five games including defeating previously undefeated James Madison University while College GameDay was on campus. Clark earned a spot in the Sun Belt Conference title game in Troy, Alabama. Shawn Clark led Appalachian State to its 7th bowl win in the Avocados from Mexico Cure Bowl 13–9 over Miami (OH). On December 2, 2024, Clark was released from his contract.

=== Dowell Loggains era (2025) ===
Dowell Loggains was hired as new head coach on December 7, 2024. He was previously the offensive coordinator and quarterbacks coach for South Carolina.

== Conference affiliations ==
- Independent (1928–1930, 1968–1971)
- North State Conference (1931–1960)
- Smoky Mountain Conference (1935–1937)
- Carolinas Conference (1961–1967)
- Southern Conference (1972–2013)
- Sun Belt Conference (2014–present)

== Championships ==
=== National championships ===
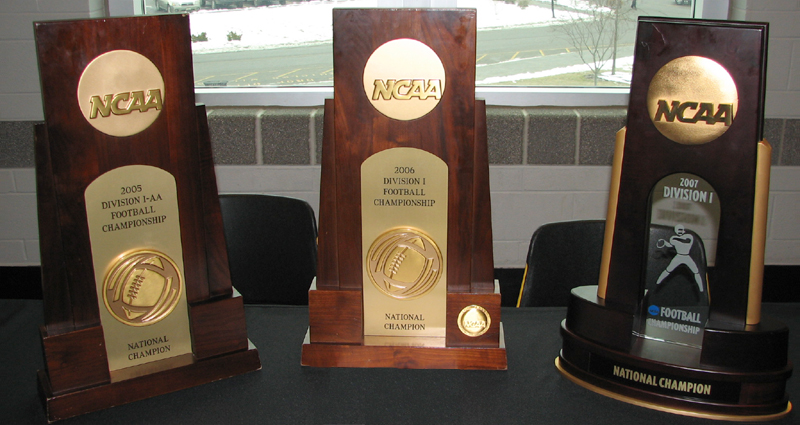
Appalachian State's National Championship trophies

Appalachian has won three national championships in the NCAA Division I Football Championship Subdivision, at the time, the highest division in college football to hold a playoff tournament to determine its champion. The Mountaineers became the fifth program in FCS history to reach the national title game three straight years joining Eastern Kentucky (1979–82), Georgia Southern (1988–90 and 1998–2000), Marshall (1991–93) and Youngstown State (1991–94). Appalachian also had a 13-game postseason winning streak, a record for consecutive wins in contiguous years that ended with a loss to Richmond in 2008.

Year	Coach	Selector	Record	CG opponent	Result
2005	Jerry Moore	NCAA 16 Team playoff	12–3	Northern Iowa	W 21–16
2006	Jerry Moore	NCAA 16 Team playoff	14–1	Massachusetts	W 28–17
2007	Jerry Moore	NCAA 16 Team playoff	13–2	Delaware	W 49–21

=== Conference championships ===
Appalachian State has won 22 conference titles, 16 outright and six shared. Before leaving the Southern Conference in 2014, the Mountaineers had won 10 conference titles, placing them second in the league's history. The Furman Paladins lead the SoCon with 12 championships.

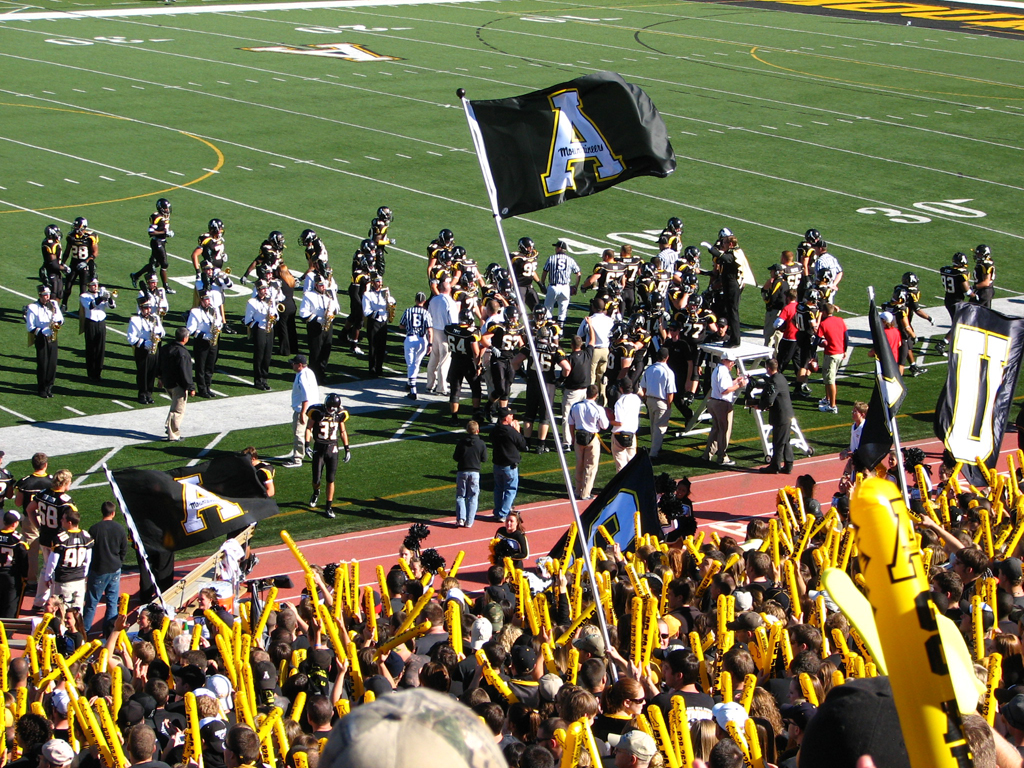
The Mountaineer football team gathers on the sideline

Year	Conference	Overall record	Conference record	Coach
1931	North State	9–2–2	3–0	C. B. Johnson
1937	North State	8–1–1	5–0	Kidd Brewer
1939	North State	7–1–2	3–0–1	Flucie Stewart
1948	North State	8–1–1	7–0–1	E. C. Duggins
1950	North State	9–2–1	7–0–1	E. C. Duggins
1954	North State	8–3	6–0	E. C. Duggins
1986	Southern	9–2–1	6–0–1	Sparky Woods
1987	Southern	11–3	7–0	Sparky Woods
1991	Southern	8–4	6–1	Jerry Moore
1995	Southern	12–1	8–0	Jerry Moore
1999†	Southern	9–3	7–1	Jerry Moore
2005	Southern	12–3	6–1	Jerry Moore
2006	Southern	14–1	7–0	Jerry Moore
2007†	Southern	13–2	5–2	Jerry Moore
2008	Southern	11–3	8–0	Jerry Moore
2009	Southern	11–3	8–0	Jerry Moore
2010†	Southern	9–2	7–1	Jerry Moore
2012†	Southern	8–3	6–2	Jerry Moore
2016†	Sun Belt	9–3	7–1	Scott Satterfield
2017†	Sun Belt	8–4	7–1	Scott Satterfield
2018	Sun Belt	11–2	7–1	Scott Satterfield
2019	Sun Belt	12–1	7–1	Eliah Drinkwitz

† Co-champions

=== Division championships ===
Season	Division	Coach	Conf record	Overall record	Opponent	Sun Belt CG result
2018	Sun Belt East	Scott Satterfield	7–1	10–2	Louisiana	W 30–19
2019	Sun Belt East	Eliah Drinkwitz	7–1	12–1	Louisiana	W 45–38
2021	Sun Belt East	Shawn Clark	7–1	10–2	Louisiana	L 16–24

== Bowl games ==
The Mountaineers' have played in 18 bowl games; their record so far is 10–8. Their first nine bowl games are listed in NCAA records, but the games were not considered NCAA-sanctioned bowls.

Date	Coach	Bowl	Opponent	Result
November 26, 1937	Kidd Brewer	Doll and Toy Charity Game	Southern Mississippi	L 0–7
December 3, 1938	Kidd Brewer	Charlotte Charity Game	Moravian College	W 20–0
November 20, 1948	E. C. Duggins	Burley Bowl	West Chester	L 2–7
December 10, 1949†	E. C. Duggins	Pythian Bowl	Catawba College	W 21–7
November 23, 1950	E. C. Duggins	Burley Bowl	Emory and Henry College	L 6–26
December 9, 1950	E. C. Duggins	Pythian Bowl	West Liberty State College	L 26–28
November 25, 1954	E. C. Duggins	Burley Bowl	East Tennessee State	W 28–13
December 11, 1954	E. C. Duggins	Elks Bowl	Newberry College	L 13–20
November 19, 1955	E. C. Duggins	Burley Bowl	East Tennessee State	L 0–7
December 19, 2015	Scott Satterfield	Camellia Bowl	Ohio	W 31–29
December 17, 2016	Scott Satterfield	Camellia Bowl	Toledo	W 31–28
December 23, 2017	Scott Satterfield	Dollar General Bowl	Toledo	W 34–0
December 15, 2018	Mark Ivey	New Orleans Bowl	Middle Tennessee	W 45–13
December 21, 2019	Shawn Clark	New Orleans Bowl	UAB	W 31–17
December 21, 2020	Shawn Clark	Myrtle Beach Bowl	North Texas	W 56–28
December 17, 2021	Shawn Clark	Boca Raton Bowl	Western Kentucky	L 38–59
December 16, 2023	Shawn Clark	Cure Bowl	Miami (OH)	W 13–9
December 29, 2025	Dowell Loggains	Birmingham Bowl	Georgia Southern	L 10–29

†NCAA records list the date of the first Pythian Bowl as November 26, 1949, which is inconsistent with contemporary newspaper reports.

== Head coaches ==
Coach	Tenure	Seasons	Record	Conf. record	Conf. champs	Bowl games	National titles
Graydon Eggers	1928	1	3–6	–	–	–	–
C. B. Johnston	1929–1932	4	26–9–7	5–1	1	–	–
Eugene Garbee	1933–1934	2	10–6–1	2–0	–	–	–
Kidd Brewer	1935–1938	4	30–5–3	12–2–1	1	2	–
Flucie Stewart	1939, 1946	2	13–4–2	7–1–1	1	–	–
R. W. "Red" Watkins	1940–1941	2	10–9	4–5	–	–	–
Beattie Feathers	1942	1	5–2–1	2–2	–	–	–
Francis Hoover	1945	1	1–6	1–3	–	–	–
E. C. Duggins	1947–1950, 1952–1955	8	57–25–3	40–13–2	3	7	–
Press Mull	1951	1	6–3	3–3	–	–	–
Bob Broome	1956–1958	3	13–16	9–9	–	–	–
Bob Breitenstein	1959	1	6–4	5–1	–	–	–
Jim Duncan	1960–1964	5	31–15–2	20–6–2	–	–	–
Carl Messere	1965–1970	6	34–26–1	10–10	–	–	–
Jim Brakefield	1971–1979	9	47–48–4	19–20–2	–	–	–
Mike Working	1980–1982	3	13–18–2	8–11–2	–	–	–
Mack Brown	1983	1	6–5	4–3	–	–	–
Sparky Woods	1984–1988	5	38–19–2	25–9–1	2	–	–
Jerry Moore	1989–2012	24	215–87	144–40	10	–	3
Scott Satterfield	2013–2018	6	51–24	38–10	3	3	–
Eliah Drinkwitz	2019	1	12–1	7–1	1	–	–
Shawn Clark	2019–2024	5	34–17	22–10	–	4	–
Dowell Loggains	2025–present	2	5–8	2–6	–	1	–

Note: Appalachian did not field a team in 1943 or 1944.

== Rivalries ==
=== Georgia Southern ===
Known as Deeper than Hate, Appalachian State competes in a Sun Belt Conference rivalry with Georgia Southern. Appalachian State holds a 21–18–1 lead through the 2025 season.

=== Marshall ===
Nicknamed The Old Mountain Feud, Appalachian State competes in a rivalry with fellow Appalachian mountain-based public university Marshall. The rivalry game was played annually 1977–1996. From 1986 to 1996 the Southern Conference foes won at least a share of the conference title a combined eight times. The rivalry resumed annual play in the 2020 season and is set to continue as Marshall joins Appalachian State in the Sun Belt Conference East Division in 2022. Appalachian State leads the total series, 15–10.

=== Western Carolina ===
Known as the Battle for the Old Mountain Jug, Appalachian State played Western Carolina in a regional rivalry game from 1932 to 2013. The only years in that period in which the game was not played were 1942 to 1945, during U.S. involvement in World War II. In 1976, a traveling trophy known as the Old Mountain Jug was created from an old moonshine jug. Appalachian's record in games played is 59–18–1, and 31–7 in the Jug era. The Mountaineers hold the trophy, having won each of the last nine games (2005–2013) and 26 of the last 28. The next meeting in the series will be on September 2, 2028.

== Stadium ==
=== College Field (1928–61) ===
College Field was the home of Appalachian football from 1928 to 1961. Located at the future site of Rankin Hall and Edwin Duncan Hall, the stadium was replaced by Kidd Brewer Stadium in 1962.

=== Kidd Brewer Stadium (1962–present) ===
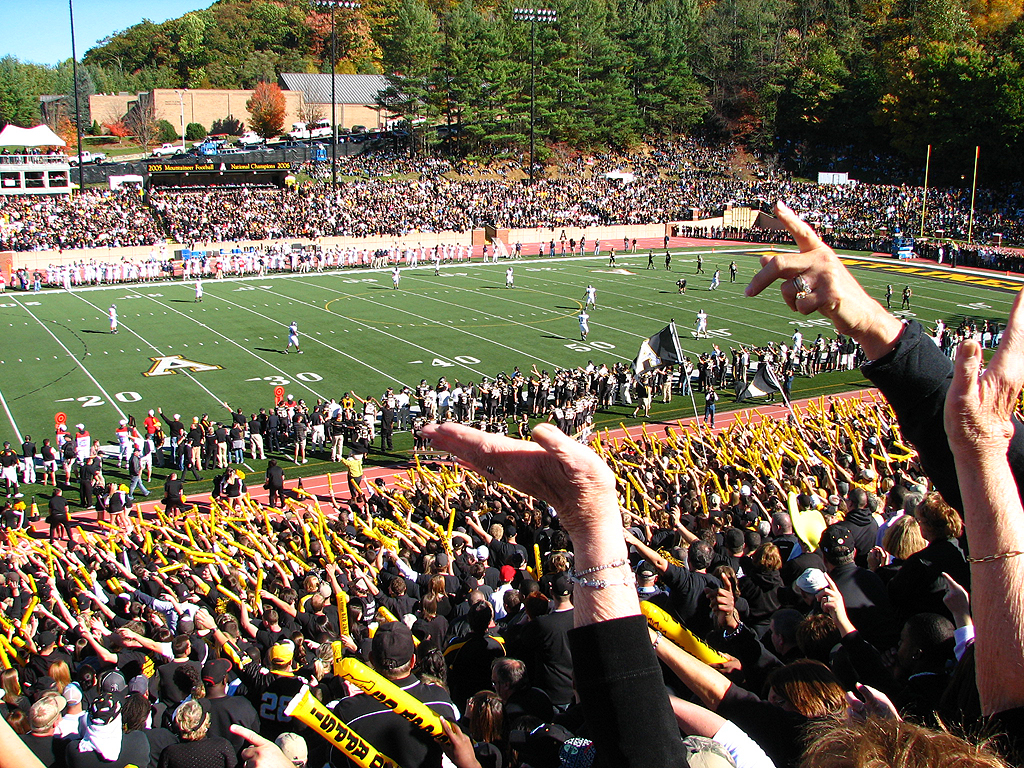
Kidd Brewer Stadium in 2007, with over 28,000 in attendance

Opened in 1962, Kidd Brewer Stadium was originally named Conrad Stadium after former university trustee and R.J. Reynolds executive William J. Conrad. The stadium was renamed in 1988 for Kidd Brewer who coached the Mountaineers from 1935 to 1938. Nicknamed "The Rock", it sits at an elevation of 3,280 feet (1,000 m) but is measured at 3,333 feet (1,016 m) for NCAA qualifications. The stadium was the first venue in either North or South Carolina to install artificial turf. On October 3, 1970, the Mountaineers and Elon Fightin' Christians staged the first ever game played on turf in the Carolinas. After a 2002 First Round I-AA playoff loss to Maine, Appalachian compiled a 30-game unbeaten streak at Kidd Brewer Stadium that ended on October 20, 2007.

The Mountaineers led the FCS in average attendance throughout the 2007, 2008, and 2010 seasons. Kidd Brewer saw average crowds of 24,219, 25,161 and 25,715 respectively.

Renovations

Completed in 2009, the stadium has seen extensive renovations as part of a $50 million facilities improvement campaign. An upper deck with additional seating for 4,400 was added to the east (visitor) stands prior to the 2008 season. Additional restrooms and concessions have been added. Most significantly, rising behind the west (home) stands and replacing the former pressbox facilities, the 100,000 square feet (9,300 m^{2}) KBS Complex was completed before the start of the 2009 season. The KBS Complex includes new stadium entrance plaza, strength and conditioning rooms, a hydrotherapy room, locker rooms, athletics offices, stadium suites and club seating.

Kidd Brewer Stadium in 2025

On February 28, 2017, the Appalachian State athletics office announced a construction project to increase the size of the video display board in Kidd-Brewer Stadium. The proposed video board is approximately 2,500 square feet (50' x 90'), with LED display, 13HD technology and a Daktronics custom audio system integrated into the video board. The cost of the project was estimated to be approximately $60 million and was completed prior to the 2017 season.

Appalachian State constructed a new field house in the North End-zone to replace the 45-year-old Owens Field House which was demolished in February 2019. The new field house project had a budget of $45 million and added 1,000 new seats to Kidd Brewer Stadium. The new field house includes athletic training, hydrotherapy and locker rooms, and nutrition science research areas, as well as conference and continuing education training space, potential medical office space, dining facilities, a team store and ticketing office, and offices for coaches and athletics staff. The project was completed in time for the 2021 football season.

== Notable games ==
=== 2002 Furman Paladins ===
The Miracle on the Mountain took place at Kidd Brewer Stadium on October 12, 2002, and was selected as the "ABC Sports Radio Call of the Year". In a low-scoring affair, the Paladins elected to attempt a two-point conversion after scoring the go-ahead touchdown with 7 seconds left in the game. Leading 15–14, Furman quarterback Billy Napier's pass was intercepted by Josh Jeffries at the 4-yard line. He lateraled the ball to Derrick Black who returned it for a score giving the Mountaineers a 16–15 win.

=== 2007 Michigan Wolverines ===
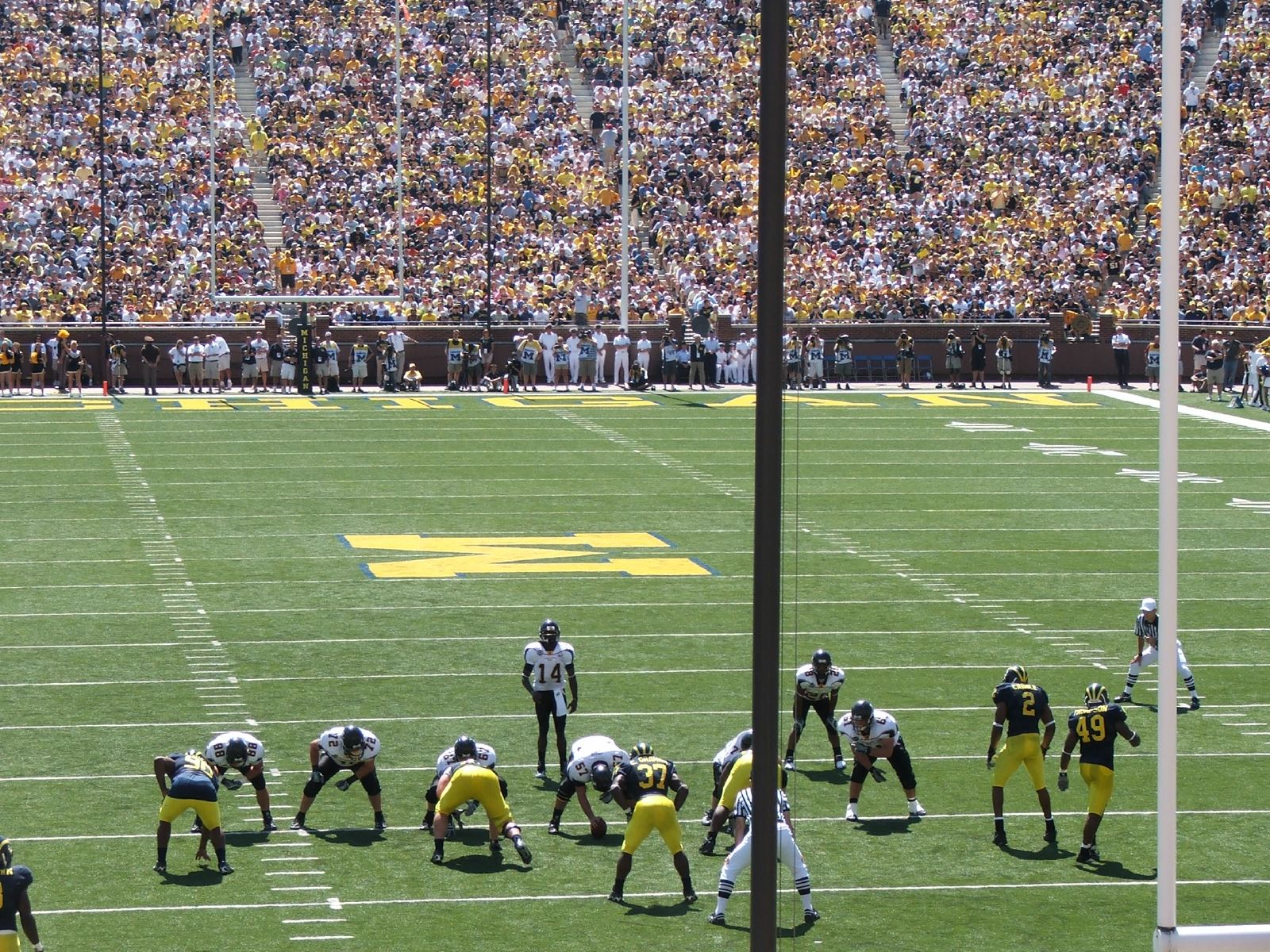
Appalachian State and Michigan at the line of scrimmage

On September 1, 2007, the Appalachian State football team traveled to Ann Arbor to play their season opener at the University of Michigan. A sellout crowd of over 109,000 fans packed Michigan Stadium, becoming the largest crowd to ever witness an ASU football game. Appalachian State beat AP No. 5 Michigan 34–32 and became the first FCS football team to defeat an FBS team ranked in the AP poll. This victory was seen by some analysts to be one of the greatest upsets in NCAA football history. Following the win, they were featured on the cover of the following week's issue of Sports Illustrated.

=== 2018 Sun Belt Championship ===
On December 1, 2018, Appalachian State played in and won the first ever Sun Belt Championship Game, hosting the Ragin' Cajuns of University of Louisiana at Lafayette at Kidd Brewer Stadium. This momentous game, broadcast on ESPN, saw the Mountaineers come out on top 30–19. This gave the Mountaineers a berth to the 2018 New Orleans Bowl, which Appalachian State won 45–13 over Middle Tennessee State.

=== 2019 North Carolina Tar Heels ===
On September 21, 2019, the Mountaineers defeated North Carolina. Appalachian entered the game as a 3-point underdog against UNC and their returning coach Mack Brown. UNC opened the game with a long kick off return followed by a one play touchdown to take the lead 7–0. App State responded with 20 unanswered points including a Demetrius Taylor fumble recovery for a touchdown and Darrynton Evans rushing touchdown set up by Demetrius Taylor's interception. UNC came back to cut the halftime score to 27–17 in favor of Appalachian State. UNC scored first in the 3rd quarter to cut the lead to 27–24. The Mountaineers responded with a four-play touchdown drive capped with Darrynton Evans' 3rd rushing touchdown of the game. UNC scored again in the 4th quarter and kept Appalachian's offense in check, bringing the score to 34–31 Mountaineers in the final minutes. With 40 seconds left UNC drove down the field and lined up to attempt a 56-yard field with 5 seconds left. App State linebacker Akeem Davis-Gaither burst through the line and tipped the ball to solidify the Mountaineer victory.

=== 2019 Sun Belt Championship ===
On December 7, 2019, Appalachian State also played in and won the second ever Sun Belt Championship Game, again hosting the Ragin' Cajuns of University of Louisiana at Lafayette at Kidd Brewer Stadium. The Mountaineers won an offense-laden game, 45–38. Appalachian State went on to win the 2019 New Orleans Bowl over UAB, 31–17. The 2019 Appalachian State Mountaineers football team finished the season ranked No. 19 in the final AP poll.

=== 2022 Texas A&M Aggies ===
On September 10, 2022, the Mountaineers faced off against Texas A&M. With the Aggies ranked No. 6 in the week's Associated Press poll, Appalachian State was a 19-point underdog after falling in a narrow 63–61 decision against North Carolina in opening week play. Thanks to an offensive effort that controlled the ball for over 41 minutes of game time, the Mountaineers earned an improbable 17–14 victory, earning their first win over a top 10 opponent since the triumph over Michigan. The final scoring effort was an 18-play, 63-yard drive that took over nine minutes to finish before Michael Hughes kicked a 29-yard field goal. The Aggies missed a field goal on their own final possession, allowing App State to run out the final 3:43.

== Individual award winners ==
=== National award winners – players ===
- Buck Buchanan Award

FCS National Defensive Player of the Year
1995: Dexter Coakley
1996: Dexter Coakley

- Buck Buchanan Award Finalists

1995: Dexter Coakley (1st)
1996: Dexter Coakley (1st)
1999: Corey Hall (N/A)
2000: Joe Best (13th)
2001: Josh Jeffries (7th)
2002: Josh Jeffries (8th)
2003: K.T. Stovall (11th)
2005: Marques Murrell (9th)
2006: Marques Murrell (3rd) & Jeremy Wiggins (9th)
2007: Corey Lynch (2nd)
2008: Mark LeGree (3rd)
2009: Mark LeGree (5th)
2012: Jeremy Kimbrough (2nd) & Demetrius McCray (16th)

- Walter Payton Award

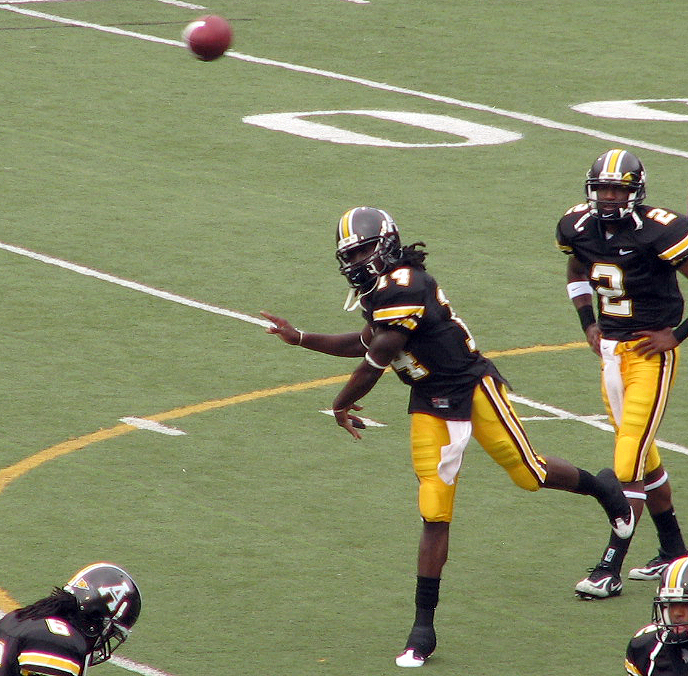
Quarterback Armanti Edwards played at Appalachian State from 2006 to 2009

FCS National Offensive Player of the Year
2008: Armanti Edwards
2009: Armanti Edwards

- Walter Payton Award Finalists

2004: DaVon Fowlkes (3rd) & Richie Williams (15th)
2005: Richie Williams (6th)
2006: Kevin Richardson (12th)
2007: Kevin Richardson (10th)
2008: Armanti Edwards (1st)
2009: Armanti Edwards (1st)
2010: DeAndre Presley (3rd)
2011: Brian Quick (15th)
2012: Jamal Jackson (14th)

=== National award winners – coaches ===
- Eddie Robinson Award

National Coach of the Year
2006: Jerry Moore

- American Football Coaches Association (AFCA)

National Coach of the Year
2005: Jerry Moore
2006: Jerry Moore
2007: Jerry Moore

=== Southern Conference honors ===
- Male Athlete of the Year

Bob Waters Award
1979–80: Rick Beasley
1986–87: John Settle
1995–96: Dexter Coakley
1996–97: Dexter Coakley
2004–05: DaVon Fowlkes
2005–06: Richie Williams
2006–07: Marques Murrell
2009–10: Armanti Edwards

- Offensive Player of the Year

Roy M. "Legs" Hawley Award (media)
1979: Rick Beasley (media)
1986: John Settle (media)
2004: DaVon Fowlkes (coaches and media)
2005: Richie Williams (coaches and media)
2006: Kevin Richardson (coaches and media)
2008: Armanti Edwards (coaches and media)
2009: Armanti Edwards (coaches and media)
2010: DeAndre Presley (coaches and media)

- Defensive Player of the Year

1987: Anthony Downs (media)
1991: Rico Mack (media)
1992: Avery Hall (coaches and media)
1994: Dexter Coakley (coaches and media)
1995: Dexter Coakley (coaches and media)
1996: Dexter Coakley (coaches and media)
2002: Josh Jeffries (coaches and media)
2003: K.T. Stovall (coaches)
2006: Marques Murrell (coaches)
2007: Corey Lynch (coaches and media)
2008: Jacque Roman (coaches)
2012: Jeremy Kimbrough (coaches)

- Freshman of the Year

1983: John Settle (media)
1985: Tim Sanders (media)
1991: Chip Hooks (coaches and media)
1993: Dexter Coakley (coaches and media)
2006: Armanti Edwards (coaches and media)
2012: Sean Price (coaches and media)

- Jacobs Blocking Trophy

1976: Gill Beck
1977: Gill Beck
1987: James Hardman
1989: Derrick Graham
2005: Matt Isenhour
2006: Kerry Brown
2007: Kerry Brown
2009: Mario Acitelli

- Coach of the Year

Wallace Wade Award (media)
1985: Sparky Woods (media)
1986: Sparky Woods (media)
1987: Sparky Woods (media)
1991: Jerry Moore (coaches and media)
1994: Jerry Moore (coaches and media)
1995: Jerry Moore (coaches and media)
2005: Jerry Moore (coaches and media)
2006: Jerry Moore (coaches and media)
2008: Jerry Moore (coaches and media)
2009: Jerry Moore (coaches and media)
2010: Jerry Moore (coaches and media)

=== Sun Belt Conference honors ===
- Offensive Player of the Year

2016: Jalin Moore
2018: Zac Thomas
2019: Darrynton Evans

- Defensive Player of the Year

2015: Ronald Blair
2019: Akeem Davis-Gaither
2021: D'Marco Jackson

- Freshman of the Year

2014: Taylor Lamb
2016: Clifton Duck

- Newcomer of the Year

2021: Chase Brice
2023: Joey Aguilar

- Coach of the Year

2018: Scott Satterfield

=== Other awards and honors ===
Kirkland Blocking Trophy

1964: Larry Hand

National Statistical Champion

1936: Len Wilson (scoring)
1974: Joe Parker (punting)
1979: Rick Beasley (receiving)
1991: Harold Alexander (punting)
1992: Harold Alexander (punting)
2004: DaVon Fowlkes (receptions, receiving yards, all-purpose yards)

== Hall of Fame selections ==
- College Football Hall of Fame

2011: Dexter Coakley
2014: Jerry Moore
2024: Armanti Edwards

- Southern Conference Hall of Fame

2011: Dexter Coakley
2014: Jerry Moore
2016: Armanti Edwards

== Retired numbers ==
Appalachian State Mountaineers retired numbers
No.	Player	Pos.	Tenure	No. ret.	Ref.
14	Armanti Edwards	QB	2006–2009	2023	
23	John Settle	RB	1983–1986	1986	
32	Dexter Coakley	LB	1993–1996	2005	
38	Dino Hackett	LB	1982–1985	2005	
71	Larry Hand	DE/DT	1960–1964	2006	

== Future non-conference opponents ==
Announced schedules as of October 20, 2026.

2026	2027	2028	2029	2030	2031	2032	2033	2034
Maine	Boise State	Western Carolina	vs. East Carolina (Note: Duke's Mayo Classic at Bank of America Stadium in Charlotte, NC)	at Charlotte	at Liberty	at Oregon State	South Carolina	at South Carolina
at East Carolina	at South Carolina	Charlotte	at South Carolina	Toledo				
Charlotte	at Charlotte	at Toledo	at Charlotte					
at NC State		NC State						
