= 2007 Chattanooga Mocs football team =

American college football season

2007 Chattanooga Mocs football
- Conference: Southern Conference
- Record: 2–9 (2–5 SoCon)
- Head coach: Rodney Allison (5th season)
- Offensive coordinator: Carmen Felus (2nd season)
- Defensive coordinator: Billy Taylor (3rd season)
- Home stadium: Finley Stadium

2007 Southern Conference football standings
	Conf.			Overall
Team	W		L	W		L
No. 1 Appalachian State +^	5	–	2	13	–	2
No. 6 Wofford +^	5	–	2	9	–	4
No. 17 Georgia Southern	4	–	3	7	–	4
No. 23 Elon	4	–	3	7	–	4
The Citadel	4	–	3	7	–	4
Furman	4	–	3	6	–	5
Chattanooga	2	–	5	2	–	9
Western Carolina	0	–	7	1	–	10
+ – Conference co-champions; ^ – FCS playoff participant; Rankings from The Sports Network FCS Poll

The 2007 Chattanooga Mocs football team represented the University of Tennessee at Chattanooga as a member of the Southern Conference (SoCon) in the 2007 NCAA Division I FCS football season. The Mocs were led by fifth-year head coach Rodney Allison and played their home games at Finley Stadium. They finished the season 2–9 overall and 2–5 in SoCon play to place seventh.

== Schedule ==
Date	Time	Opponent	Site	Result	Attendance	Source
August 30	7:00 pm	Carson–Newman*	Finley Stadium; Chattanooga, TN	L 17–29	7,544	
September 8	3:30 pm	at Jacksonville State*	Paul Snow Stadium; Jacksonville, AL	L 19–33	10,123	
September 22	7:00 pm	at Georgia Southern	Paulson Stadium; Statesboro, GA	W 45–38 ^{OT}	18,785	
September 29	6:00 pm	The Citadel	Finley Stadium; Chattanooga, TN	L 16-41	6,745	
October 6	7:00 pm	at Arkansas*	War Memorial Stadium; Little Rock, AR	L 15–34	54,836	
October 13	6:00 pm	Western Carolina^{†}	Finley Stadium; Chattanooga, TN	W 39–21	7,705	
October 20	6:00 pm	Furman	Finley Stadium; Chattanooga, TN	L 22–28	5,015	
October 27	1:30 pm	at No. 16 Elon	Rhodes Stadium; Elon, NC	L 28–37	9,118	
November 3	2:00 pm	Western Kentucky*	Finley Stadium; Chattanooga, TN	L 21–28	5,668	
November 10	2:00 pm	No. 15 Wofford	Finley Stadium; Chattanooga, TN	L 16–42	4,907	
November 17	3:30 pm	at No. 6 Appalachian State	Kidd Brewer Stadium; Boone, NC	L 17–37	23,328	
*Non-conference game; ^{†}Homecoming; Rankings from The Sports Network Poll released prior to the game; All times are in Eastern time
