= 2007 Furman Paladins football team =

American college football season

2007 Furman Paladins football
- Conference: Southern Conference
- Record: 6–5 (4–3 SoCon)
- Head coach: Bobby Lamb (6th season)
- Captains: Renaldo Gray; Scott Shuford; Gary Nelson; Austin Holmes
- Home stadium: Paladin Stadium

2007 Southern Conference football standings
	Conf.			Overall
Team	W		L	W		L
No. 1 Appalachian State +^	5	–	2	13	–	2
No. 6 Wofford +^	5	–	2	9	–	4
No. 17 Georgia Southern	4	–	3	7	–	4
No. 23 Elon	4	–	3	7	–	4
The Citadel	4	–	3	7	–	4
Furman	4	–	3	6	–	5
Chattanooga	2	–	5	2	–	9
Western Carolina	0	–	7	1	–	10
+ – Conference co-champions; ^ – FCS playoff participant; Rankings from The Sports Network FCS Poll

The 2007 Furman Paladins football team was an American football team that represented Furman University as a member of the Southern Conference (SoCon) during the 2007 NCAA Division I FCS football season. In their sixth year under head coach Bobby Lamb, the Paladins compiled an overall record of 6–5 with a conference mark of 4–3, finishing tied for third in the SoCon.

== Schedule ==
Date	Opponent	Rank	Site	Result	Attendance	Source
September 1	Presbyterian*	No. 11	Paladin Stadium; Greenville, SC	W 40–16	11,188	
September 8	at Hofstra*	No. 9	James M. Shuart Stadium; Hempstead, NY	L 17–32	5,028	
September 15	at No. 20 (FBS) Clemson*	No. 15	Memorial Stadium; Clemson, SC	L 10–38	80,419	
September 29	No. 8 Wofford	No. 20	Paladin Stadium; Greenville, SC (rivalry)	L 20–45	15,701	
October 6	Coastal Carolina*		Paladin Stadium; Greenville, SC	W 27–17	11,251	
October 13	at The Citadel		Johnson Hagood Stadium; Charleston, SC (rivalry)	L 51–54 ^{OT}	16,272	
October 20	at Chattanooga		Finley Stadium; Chattanooga, TN	W 28–22	5,015	
October 27	No. 10 Appalachian State		Paladin Stadium; Greenville, SC	L 27–34	13,811	
November 3	No. 14 Elon		Paladin Stadium; Greenville, SC	W 52–49	11,576	
November 10	at No. 11 Georgia Southern		Paulson Stadium; Statesboro, GA	W 24–22	23,373	
November 17	at Western Carolina		Bob Waters Field at E. J. Whitmire Stadium; Cullowhee, NC	W 52–21	5,175	
*Non-conference game; Rankings from The Sports Network Poll released prior to the game
