= 2007 Elon Phoenix football team =

American college football season

2007 Elon Phoenix football
- Conference: Southern Conference

Ranking
- Sports Network: No. 23
- Record: 7–4 (4–3 SoCon)
- Head coach: Pete Lembo (2nd season)
- Defensive coordinator: Jay Bateman (2nd season)
- Home stadium: Rhodes Stadium

2007 Southern Conference football standings
	Conf.			Overall
Team	W		L	W		L
No. 1 Appalachian State +^	5	–	2	13	–	2
No. 6 Wofford +^	5	–	2	9	–	4
No. 17 Georgia Southern	4	–	3	7	–	4
No. 23 Elon	4	–	3	7	–	4
The Citadel	4	–	3	7	–	4
Furman	4	–	3	6	–	5
Chattanooga	2	–	5	2	–	9
Western Carolina	0	–	7	1	–	10
+ – Conference co-champions; ^ – FCS playoff participant; Rankings from The Sports Network FCS Poll

The 2007 Elon Phoenix football team was an American football team that represented Elon University as a member of the Southern Conference (SoCon) during the 2007 NCAA Division I FCS football season. Led by second-year head coach Pete Lembo, the Phoenix compiled an overall record of 7–4, with a mark of 4–3 in conference play, and finished tied for third in the SoCon.

== Schedule ==
Date	Time	Opponent	Rank	Site	TV	Result	Attendance	Source
September 1	7:00 p.m.	at South Florida*		Raymond James Stadium; Tampa, FL	GamePlan	L 13–28	33,639	
September 8	6:00 p.m.	West Virginia Wesleyan*		Rhodes Stadium; Elon, NC		W 59–16	6,248	
September 22	1:30 p.m.	Liberty*		Rhodes Stadium; Elon, NC		W 42–14	6,796	
September 29	1:30 p.m.	No. 5 Appalachian State	No. 24	Rhodes Stadium; Elon, NC		L 32–49	13,100	
October 6	6:00 p.m.	at Western Carolina		E. J. Whitmire Stadium; Cullowhee, NC		W 38–36	7,734	
October 13	3:00 p.m.	No. 21 Georgia Southern		Rhodes Stadium; Elon, NC	SS	W 36–33 ^{2OT}	5,429	
October 20	1:30 p.m.	at No. 7 Wofford	No. 24	Gibbs Stadium; Spartanburg, SC		W 24–13	8,229	
October 27	1:30 p.m.	Chattanooga	No. 16	Rhodes Stadium; Elon, NC		W 37–28	9,118	
November 3	2:00 p.m.	at Furman	No. 14	Paladin Stadium; Greenville, SC		L 49–52	11,576	
November 10	1:00 p.m.	at The Citadel	No. 19	Johnson Hagood Stadium; Charleston, SC	BI	L 31–42	10,261	
November 17	3:30 p.m.	Stony Brook*	No. 24	Rhodes Stadium; Elon, NC		W 38–23	5,715	
*Non-conference game; Rankings from The Sports Network Poll released prior to the game; All times are in Eastern time
