= 2007 Western Carolina Catamounts football team =

American college football season

2007 Western Carolina Catamounts football
- Conference: Southern Conference
- Record: 1–10 (0–7 SoCon)
- Head coach: Kent Briggs (6th season)
- Defensive coordinator: Don Powers (2nd season)
- Home stadium: Bob Waters Field at E. J. Whitmire Stadium

2007 Southern Conference football standings
	Conf.			Overall
Team	W		L	W		L
No. 1 Appalachian State +^	5	–	2	13	–	2
No. 6 Wofford +^	5	–	2	9	–	4
No. 17 Georgia Southern	4	–	3	7	–	4
No. 23 Elon	4	–	3	7	–	4
The Citadel	4	–	3	7	–	4
Furman	4	–	3	6	–	5
Chattanooga	2	–	5	2	–	9
Western Carolina	0	–	7	1	–	10
+ – Conference co-champions; ^ – FCS playoff participant; Rankings from The Sports Network poll

The 2007 Western Carolina Catamounts team represented Western Carolina University as a member of the Southern Conference (SoCon) during the 2007 NCAA Division I FCS football season. Led by Kent Briggs in his sixth and final season as head coach, the Catamounts compiled an overall record of 2–9 with a mark of 0–7 in conference play, placing last out of eight teams in the SoCon. Western Carolina played home games at Bob Waters Field at E. J. Whitmire Stadium in Cullowhee, North Carolina.

== Schedule ==
Date	Time	Opponent	Site	TV	Result	Attendance	Source
September 1	7:00 p.m.	at Alabama*	Bryant–Denny Stadium; Tuscaloosa, AL	PPV	L 6–52	92,138	
September 8		at Eastern Kentucky*	Roy Kidd Stadium; Richmond, KY		L 21–45	9,300	
September 15	1:00 p.m.	at No. 23 (FBS) Georgia*	Sanford Stadium; Athens, GA	CSS	L 16–45	92,746	
September 22	6:00 p.m.	Presbyterian*	Bob Waters Field at E. J. Whitmire Stadium; Cullowhee, NC		W 33–20	8,365	
September 29	3:30 p.m.	at Georgia Southern	Paulson Stadium; Statesboro, GA	CSS	L 21–50	15,486	
October 6	6:00 p.m.	Elon	Bob Waters Field at E. J. Whitmire Stadium; Cullowhee, NC		L 36–38	7,734	
October 13	6:00 p.m.	at Chattanooga	Finley Stadium; Chattanooga, TN		L 21–39	7,705	
October 20	1:00 p.m.	The Citadel^{†}	Bob Waters Field at E. J. Whitmire Stadium; Cullowhee, NC		L 31–37	7,804	
October 25		No. 11 Wofford	Bob Waters Field at E. J. Whitmire Stadium; Cullowhee, NC		L 44–47	4,721	
November 10	3:30 p.m.	at No. 7 Appalachian State	Kidd Brewer Stadium; Boone, NC (rivalry)	ESPNU	L 35–79	27,977	
November 17		Furman	Bob Waters Field at E. J. Whitmire Stadium; Cullowhee, NC		L 21–52	5,175	
*Non-conference game; ^{†}Homecoming; Rankings from The Sports Network Poll released prior to the game; All times are in Eastern time
