= Jerry Moore (American football, born 1939) =

American football player and coach (born 1939)

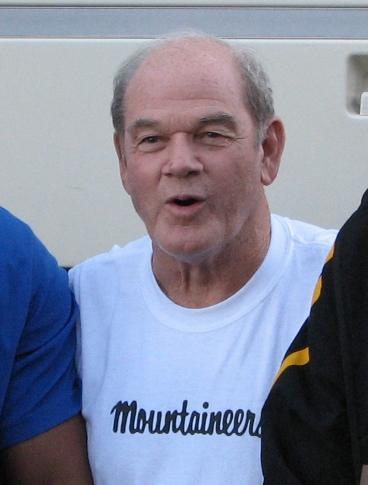
- Moore in 2006

Biographical details
- Born: July 18, 1939 (age 87); Bonham, Texas, U.S.

Playing career
- 1958–1960: Baylor
- Position: Wide receiver

Coaching career (HC unless noted)
- 1965–1972: SMU (assistant)
- 1973–1977: Nebraska (WR)
- 1978: Nebraska (OC)
- 1979–1980: North Texas State
- 1981–1985: Texas Tech
- 1988: Arkansas (assistant)
- 1989–2012: Appalachian State

Head coaching record
- Overall: 242–135–2
- Tournaments: 22–14 (NCAA Division I-AA/FCS playoffs)

Accomplishments and honors

Championships
- 3x NCAA Division I-AA/FCS (2005–2007); 10x SoCon (1991, 1995, 1999, 2005–2010, 2012)

Awards
- Eddie Robinson Award (2006); Liberty Mutual Coach of the Year (2009); 3× AFCA Division I-AA/FCS COY (2005–2007); 7× AFCA Regional COY (1994–1995, 2005–2006, 2008–2010); 8× SoCon COY (1991, 1994–1995, 2005–2006, 2008–2010); SoCon Hall of Fame (2014)
- College Football Hall of Fame; Inducted in 2014 (profile)

Gerald Hundley Moore (born July 18, 1939) is an American former college football coach and player. He served as the head football coach at North Texas State University—now the University of North Texas—from 1979 to 1980, at Texas Tech University from 1981 to 1985, and at Appalachian State University from 1989 to 2012, compiling a career college football coaching record of 242–135–2. In his 24 years at Appalachian State, Moore posted a losing season only once. He led his 2005 Mountaineers team to the NCAA Division I-AA Football Championship. This was the first national championship for any college football team in the state of North Carolina. Moore and the Mountaineers repeated as champions in 2006 and 2007, achieving the first "three-peat" in NCAA Division I FCS/I-AA history. Moore was forced out as head coach at the conclusion of the 2012 season. He was selected for inclusion into the Southern Conference Hall of Fame, and College Football Hall of Fame in 2014.

== Playing career ==
Moore played wide receiver for the Baylor Bears. He was coached by Sam Boyd in 1958 and John Bridgers in 1959 and 1960. Moore captained the 1960 Gator Bowl team that ended the year as the nation's eleventh-ranked squad.

Moore received degrees from Baylor University in finance and economics.

== Coaching career ==
Moore began his coaching career at Corsicana High School under Texas high school coach Jim Acree. In 1965, he became assistant coach at SMU. After the 1972 season, he joined the Nebraska Cornhuskers as receivers coach, becoming offensive coordinator under coach Tom Osborne in 1978.

In 1979, at North Texas State (now North Texas), Moore got his first head coaching job. After two seasons he left North Texas for Texas Tech, where he spent five seasons and garnered a record of 16–37–2 before being replaced by David McWilliams. After three years away from football, Moore joined the coaching staff at Arkansas where he remained for two seasons before taking the head coaching position at Appalachian State in 1989.

During his tenure of twenty-four years as head coach at Appalachian State, Moore led the Mountaineers to ten Southern Conference championships and three consecutive NCAA Division I-AA national championships (2005, 2006, and 2007). The 215 ASU victories under his leadership is a school record.

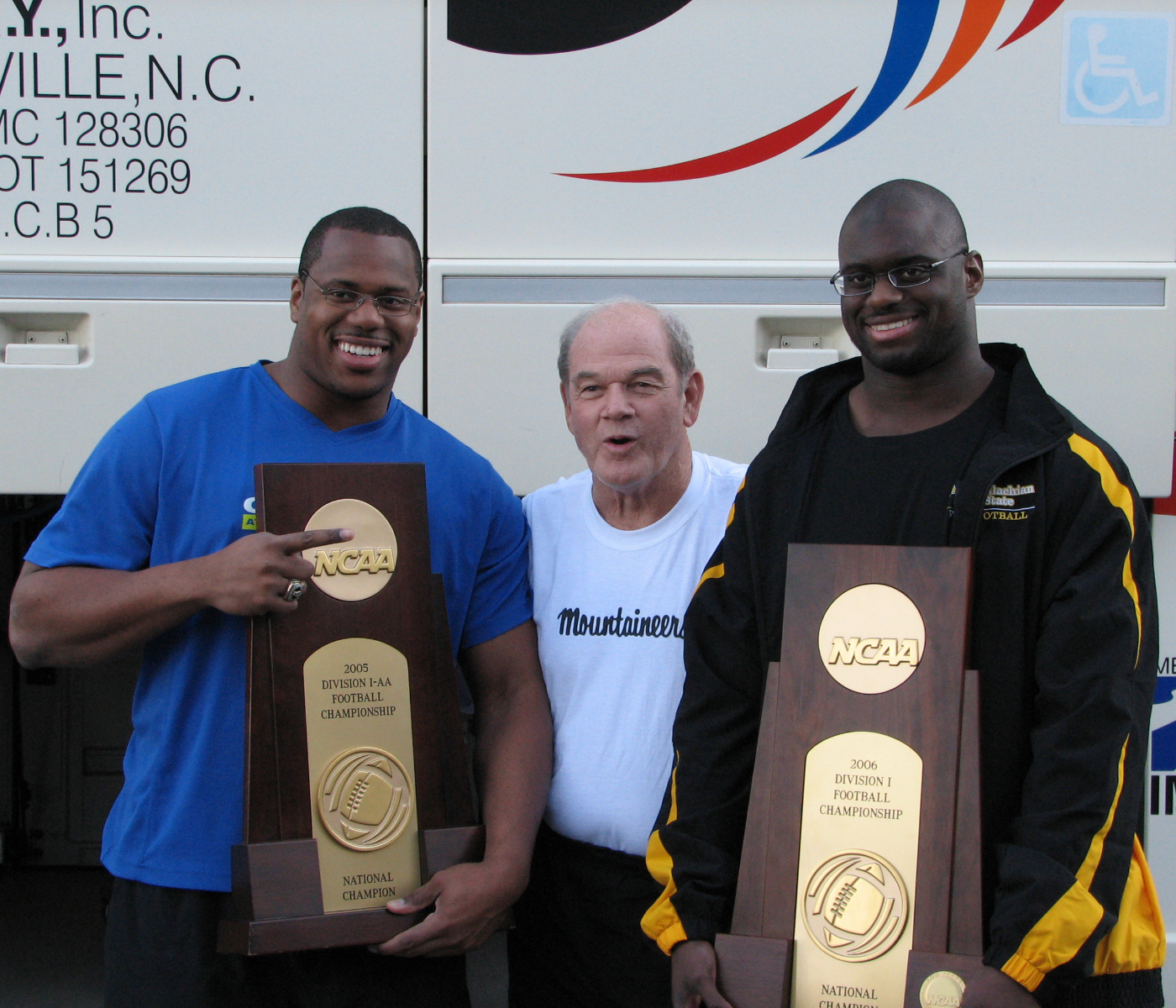
Moore with two Appalachian State players following the 2006 NCAA Division I Football Championship Game.

On September 1, 2007, Moore led Appalachian State to score one of the biggest upsets in college football history, defeating the then fifth-ranked Michigan Wolverines 34–32 at Michigan Stadium. The win over Michigan has been regarded the greatest upset of all time in college football history. This marked the first time a team in a lower subdivision defeated a ranked team in a higher subdivision. It was also the first game and loss for Michigan against a Division I FCS team. Moore had learned the spread offensive scheme that enabled him to defeat Michigan from then-West Virginia coach Rich Rodriguez, whom Michigan hired to succeed Lloyd Carr the following season.

Moore became the 28th head coach in Division I history to reach 200 wins after the Mountaineers defeated the Furman Paladins on October 25, 2008.

On December 2, 2012, after a first round home playoff loss to Illinois State, athletics director Charlie Cobb announced that Moore would not return for the 2013 season. According to a press release issued by the ASU athletic department, Cobb stated that he and Moore agreed after the end of the 2011 season that the 2012 season would be Moore's last as head coach, but chose not to make an announcement until that time. However, several days later, Moore claimed that there had been a communication gap, and that he had wanted to coach for one more season in 2013. Cobb announced that assistant head coach Scott Satterfield, who played quarterback under Moore at Appalachian from 1993 to 1995 and served as an assistant at ASU from 1998 to 2008, would serve as interim head coach while a national coaching search was conducted. Satterfield was given the permanent job on December 14, 2012.

== Legacy ==
Following the 2012 season Coach Moore remained in Boone and had distance from the program. Appalachian State moved up to the Football Bowl Subdivision in 2014 and joined the Sun Belt Conference. The program saw continued success and the hiring of Doug Gillin as the new athletic director to replace outgoing Cobb. Gillin and the coaching staff rekindled the relationship with Moore. Since then Moore is often involved with current athletic events with the Mountaineers Athletic Fund & Yosef Club and activity speaks with the current players and staff. He is credited setting the foundation of Appalachian State Football. Moore is known for the phrase "Always do more than is expected", which is used by many coaches from his coaching tree around the southeast. Baylor University selected Moore for the Baylor Football's Hall of Fame’s Wall of Honor — which recognizes graduates for their accomplishments in public or private life in 2013. Moore was inducted into the College Football Hall of Fame and the Southern Conference Hall of Fame in 2014. Coach Moore was inducted into the Appalachian State University Hall of Fame in 2015 alongside Armanti Edwards, the quarterback that led his team to 2 of the 3 national championships and a historic win over Michigan in 2007. In 2018 Moore was awarded The Order of the Long Leaf Pine, North Carolina's highest honor for service to the state. In 2019 Appalachian State University Direct of Athletics Doug Gillin announced they would be honoring Hall of Fame football coach Jerry Moore with a plaza and statue in his name outside the Kidd Brewer Stadium north end zone facility. The plaza and statue were dedicated on September 18, 2021, just prior to the first home game of the 2021 season.

== Head coaching record ==
Year	Team	Overall	Conference	Standing	Bowl/playoffs	NCAA/TSN^{#}	Coaches^{°}
North Texas State Mean Green (NCAA Division I-A independent) (1979–1980)
1979	North Texas State	5–6					
1980	North Texas State	6–5					
North Texas State:		11–11					
Texas Tech Red Raiders (Southwest Conference) (1981–1985)
1981	Texas Tech	1–9–1	0–7–1	9th			
1982	Texas Tech	4–7	3–5	T–6th			
1983	Texas Tech	3–7–1	3–4–1	6th			
1984	Texas Tech	4–7	2–6	8th			
1985	Texas Tech	4–7	1–7	8th			
Texas Tech:		16–37–2	9–29–2				
Appalachian State Mountaineers (Southern Conference) (1989–2012)
1989	Appalachian State	9–3	5–2	2nd	L NCAA Division I-AA First Round	7	
1990	Appalachian State	6–5	5–2	2nd			
1991	Appalachian State	8–4	6–1	1st	L NCAA Division I-AA First Round	10	
1992	Appalachian State	7–5	5–2	2nd	L NCAA Division I-AA First Round	16	
1993	Appalachian State	4–7	4–4	4th			
1994	Appalachian State	9–4	6–2	2nd	L NCAA Division I-AA Quarterfinal	9	
1995	Appalachian State	12–1	8–0	1st	L NCAA Division I-AA Quarterfinal	5	
1996	Appalachian State	7–4	5–3	4th		22	
1997	Appalachian State	7–4	6–2	2nd		22	
1998	Appalachian State	10–3	6–2	2nd	L NCAA Division I-AA Quarterfinal	6	
1999	Appalachian State	9–3	7–1	T–1st	L NCAA Division I-AA First Round	T–9	
2000	Appalachian State	10–4	6–2	2nd	L NCAA Division I-AA Semifinal	4	
2001	Appalachian State	9–4	6–2	2nd	L NCAA Division I-AA Quarterfinal	4	
2002	Appalachian State	8–4	6–2	2nd	L NCAA Division I-AA First Round	10	
2003	Appalachian State	7–4	6–2	2nd			
2004	Appalachian State	6–5	4–3	3rd			
2005	Appalachian State	12–3	6–1	1st	W NCAA Division I-AA Championship	1	
2006	Appalachian State	14–1	7–0	1st	W NCAA Division I Championship	1	
2007	Appalachian State	13–2	5–2	T–1st	W NCAA Division I Championship	1	1
2008	Appalachian State	11–3	8–0	1st	L NCAA Division I Quarterfinal	5	5
2009	Appalachian State	11–3	8–0	1st	L NCAA Division I Semifinal	3	T–3
2010	Appalachian State	10–3	7–1	T–1st	L NCAA Division I Quarterfinal	2	3
2011	Appalachian State	8–4	6–2	T–2nd	L NCAA Division I Second Round	9	8
2012	Appalachian State	8–4	6–2	T–1st	L NCAA Division I Second Round		
Appalachian State:		215–87	146–40				
Total:		242–135–2					
National championship Conference title Conference division title or championship game berth
^{#}Rankings from final NCAA Division I-AA Football Committee poll from 1989 to 1992 and The Sports Network poll from 1994 to 2012.; ^{°}Rankings from final FCS Coaches poll.

== See also ==
- List of college football career coaching wins leaders
