= 2007 The Citadel Bulldogs football team =

American college football season

2007 The Citadel Bulldogs football
- Conference: Southern Conference
- Record: 7–4 (4–3 SoCon)
- Head coach: Kevin Higgins (3rd season)
- Offensive coordinator: Dave Cecchini (1st season)
- Defensive coordinator: Isaac Collins (2nd season)
- Home stadium: Johnson Hagood Stadium

2007 Southern Conference football standings
	Conf.			Overall
Team	W		L	W		L
No. 1 Appalachian State +^	5	–	2	13	–	2
No. 6 Wofford +^	5	–	2	9	–	4
No. 17 Georgia Southern	4	–	3	7	–	4
No. 23 Elon	4	–	3	7	–	4
The Citadel	4	–	3	7	–	4
Furman	4	–	3	6	–	5
Chattanooga	2	–	5	2	–	9
Western Carolina	0	–	7	1	–	10
+ – Conference co-champions; ^ – FCS playoff participant; Rankings from The Sports Network FCS Poll

The 2007 The Citadel Bulldogs football team represented The Citadel, The Military College of South Carolina in the 2007 NCAA Division I FCS football season. Kevin Higgins served as head coach for the third season. The Bulldogs played as members of the Southern Conference and played home games at Johnson Hagood Stadium.

== Schedule ==
Date	Time	Opponent	Rank	Site	TV	Result	Attendance	Source
September 1	2:00 pm	Charleston Southern*		Johnson Hagood Stadium; Charleston, SC	BI	W 35–14	12,885	
September 8	2:00 pm	Webber International*		Johnson Hagood Stadium; Charleston, SC	BI	W 76–0	8,547	
September 15	12:00 pm	at No. 7 (FBS) Wisconsin*		Camp Randall Stadium; Madison, WI	BTN	L 31–45	80,327	
September 29	6:00 pm	at Chattanooga		Finley Stadium; Chattanooga, TN		W 41–16	6,745	
October 6	2:00 pm	Wofford		Johnson Hagood Stadium; Charleston, SC (rivalry)	SSN	L 7–28	14,879	
October 13	2:00 pm	Furman		Johnson Hagood Stadium; Charleston, SC (rivalry)	BI	W 54–51 ^{OT}	16,272	
October 20	1:00 pm	at Western Carolina		E. J. Whitmire Stadium; Cullowhee, NC		W 37–31	7,804	
October 27	12:00 pm	at No. 22 Georgia Southern	No. 25	Paulson Stadium; Statesboro, GA	CSS	L 17–21	18,506	
November 3	2:00 pm	No. 9 Appalachian State^{†}		Johnson Hagood Stadium; Charleston, SC	BI	L 24–45	19,697	
November 10	1:00 pm	No. 19 Elon		Johnson Hagood Stadium; Charleston, SC	BI	W 42–31	10,261	
November 17	12:00 pm	at VMI*		Alumni Memorial Field; Lexington, VA (Military Classic of the South)	CSTV	W 70–28	9,183	
*Non-conference game; ^{†}Homecoming; Rankings from The Sports Network Poll released prior to the game; All times are in Eastern time

== Ranking movements ==
Ranking movements Legend: ██ Increase in ranking ██ Decrease in ranking — = Not ranked RV = Received votes
	Week													
Poll	Pre	1	2	3	4	5	6	7	8	9	10	11	12	Final
Sports Network	—	—	—	RV	—	RV	RV	RV	25	RV	RV	RV	RV	—
Coaches' Poll	—	RV	RV	RV	RV	25	RV	RV	RV	RV	RV	—	—	RV
