= 2007 Appalachian State Mountaineers football team =

American college football season

2007 Appalachian State Mountaineers football

NCAA Division I champion SoCon co-champion

NCAA Division I Championship, W 49–21 vs. Delaware
- Conference: Southern Conference

Ranking
- Sports Network: No. 1
- FCS Coaches: No. 1
- Record: 13–2 (5–2 Southern)
- Head coach: Jerry Moore (19th season)
- Offensive coordinator: Collaborative
- Offensive scheme: Multiple spread
- Defensive coordinator: John Wiley (17th season)
- Base defense: 4–3
- Home stadium: Kidd Brewer Stadium

2007 Southern Conference football standings
	Conf.			Overall
Team	W		L	W		L
No. 1 Appalachian State +^	5	–	2	13	–	2
No. 6 Wofford +^	5	–	2	9	–	4
No. 17 Georgia Southern	4	–	3	7	–	4
No. 23 Elon	4	–	3	7	–	4
The Citadel	4	–	3	7	–	4
Furman	4	–	3	6	–	5
Chattanooga	2	–	5	2	–	9
Western Carolina	0	–	7	1	–	10
+ – Conference co-champions; ^ – FCS playoff participant; Rankings from The Sports Network poll

The 2007 Appalachian State Mountaineers football team represented Appalachian State University in the 2007 NCAA Division I FCS football season. The team was coached by Jerry Moore and played their home games at Kidd Brewer Stadium in Boone, North Carolina.

The football team competes in the Division I Football Championship Subdivision (FCS), formerly I-AA, as a member of the Southern Conference. Appalachian is the only university in North Carolina, public or private, to win a National Collegiate Athletic Association (NCAA) national championship in football. The Mountaineers won the 2005 Division I-AA Football Championship and repeated as FCS national champions in 2006 and 2007. They also captured a third consecutive Southern Conference Southern Conference title.

The team is one of only five from its division to ever defeat a team ranked in the Associated Press Poll (the others being Cincinnati in 1983, James Madison in 2010, Eastern Washington in 2013, and North Dakota State in 2016), in a road win over fifth-ranked Michigan that was hailed as one of the biggest upsets in the history of American sports. Additionally, two players from the 2007 team were selected in the 2008 NFL draft: wide receiver Dexter Jackson (Tampa Bay Buccaneers) and safety Corey Lynch (Cincinnati Bengals).

== Schedule ==
Date	Time	Opponent	Rank	Site	TV	Result	Attendance	Source
September 1	12:00 p.m.	at No. 5 (FBS) Michigan*	No. 1	Michigan Stadium; Ann Arbor, MI	BTN	W 34–32	109,218	
September 8	3:30 p.m.	Lenoir–Rhyne*	No. 1	Kidd Brewer Stadium; Boone, NC		W 48–7	28,802	
September 15	3:30 p.m.	Northern Arizona*	No. 1	Kidd Brewer Stadium; Boone, NC		W 34–21	27,104	
September 22	3:00 p.m.	at No. 13 Wofford	No. 1	Gibbs Stadium; Spartanburg, SC	SportSouth	L 31–42	11,042	
September 29	1:30 p.m.	at No. 24 Elon	No. 5	Rhodes Stadium; Elon, NC		W 49–32	13,100	
October 6	2:30 p.m.	Gardner–Webb*^{†}	No. 5	Kidd Brewer Stadium; Boone, NC		W 45–7	27,428	
October 20	3:30 p.m.	Georgia Southern	No. 5	Kidd Brewer Stadium; Boone, NC (rivalry)	MASN	L 35–38	28,202	
October 27	3:00 p.m.	at Furman	No. 10	Paladin Stadium; Greenville, SC	SportSouth	W 34–27	13,811	
November 3	2:00 p.m.	at The Citadel	No. 9	Johnson Hagood Stadium; Charleston, SC		W 45–25	19,697	
November 10	3:30 p.m.	Western Carolina	No. 7	Kidd Brewer Stadium; Boone, NC (rivalry)	ESPNU	W 79–35	27,977	
November 17	3:30 p.m.	Chattanooga	No. 6	Kidd Brewer Stadium; Boone, NC	SportSouth	W 37–17	23,328	
November 24	12:00 p.m.	No. 12 James Madison*	No. 5	Kidd Brewer Stadium; Boone, NC (NCAA Division I First Round)	CSS	W 28–27	14,040	
December 1	12:00 p.m.	No. 14 Eastern Washington*	No. 5	Kidd Brewer Stadium; Boone, NC (NCAA Division I Quarterfinal)	ESPNGP	W 38–35	16,947	
December 7	8:00 p.m.	No. 6 Richmond*	No. 5	Kidd Brewer Stadium; Boone, NC (NCAA Division I Semifinal)	ESPN2	W 55–35	24,140	
December 14	8:00 p.m.	vs. No. 13 Delaware*	No. 5	Finley Stadium; Chattanooga, TN (NCAA Division I Championship Game)	ESPN2	W 49–21	23,010	
*Non-conference game; ^{†}Homecoming; Rankings from The Sports Network Poll released prior to the game; All times are in Eastern time

== Game summaries ==
=== Michigan ===
	1	2	3	4	Total
Appalachian State	7	21	3	3	34
Michigan	14	3	9	6	32

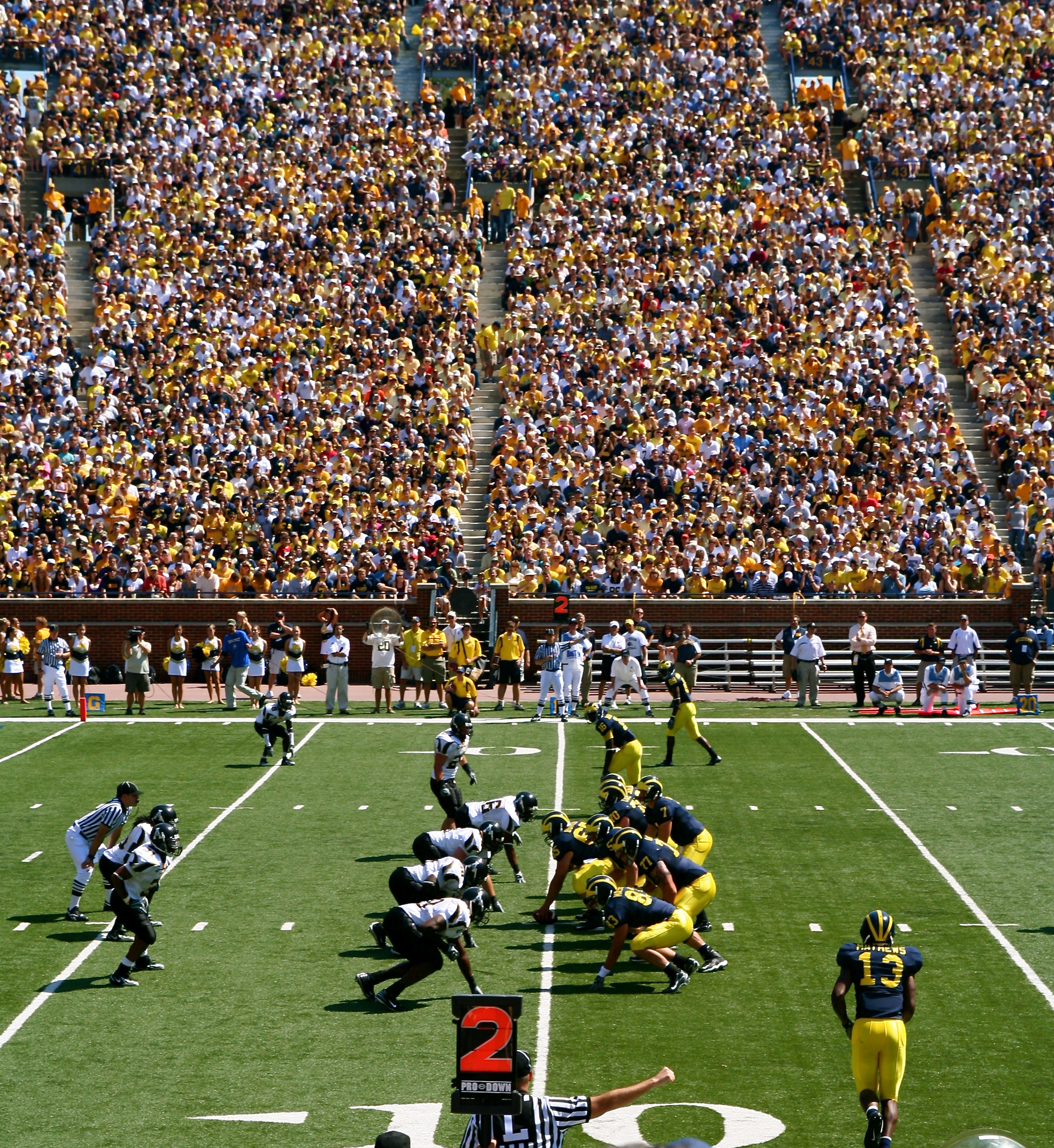
Appalachian State's victory over the Michigan Wolverines was the first time a team ranked in the AP poll has ever been defeated by a Division I FCS (formerly I-AA) team

.

Appalachian State opened the season on September 1 at Michigan Stadium on the campus of the University of Michigan in Ann Arbor, Michigan. It pitted the homestanding Michigan Wolverines against the two-time defending champions of the Division I FCS, the Appalachian State Mountaineers. In what was hailed as one of the biggest upsets in the history of American sports, the Mountaineers shocked the fifth-ranked Wolverines 34–32. It is believed to be only the first win ever by a team in Division I FCS (still frequently known by its former name of Division I-AA) over a ranked team in Division I FBS (formerly Division I-A) since the NCAA split its Division I into two football subdivisions in 1978.

Following the game, the Associated Press made FCS schools eligible to receive vote in the AP Poll that ranks college football teams; the poll was previously limited to FBS teams. On September 9, Appalachian State received 19 points and was 33rd in overall voting in the AP Poll. In the final AP Poll of the 2007 season issued in January 2008, Appalachian State earned five points, good enough for a tie at 34th place and making Appalachian State the first non-FBS program to receive votes in a season-ending AP Poll.

=== Lenoir–Rhyne ===
	1	2	3	4	Total
Lenoir–Rhyne	0	0	0	7	7
Appalachian State	21	17	10	0	48

The Mountaineers returned home after the Michigan win for their first contest at Kidd Brewer Stadium against Division II Lenoir–Rhyne on September 8. In front of a record crowd of 28,802, senior quarterback Trey Elder started the game, filling in for an injured Armanti Edwards, and threw for 210 yards and rushed for 90 more. The Mountaineers scored touchdowns on their first five possessions en route to racking up 403 yards of offense. The Bears were limited to 195 total yards. Freshman linebacker D. J. Smith lead the defense with 12 tackles. With the win, the Mountaineers extended their Division I leading win streak to 16 games and their home winning streak to 28 games.

=== Northern Arizona ===
	1	2	3	4	Total
Northern Arizona	3	3	7	8	21
Appalachian State	0	14	6	14	34

A crowd of 27,104 packed Kidd Brewer Stadium to see the Mountaineers put up 429 yards of offense in a win over Northern Arizona. The win was the 17th straight overall and 29th straight home victory. Trey Elder, starting in place of an injured Armanti Edwards, accounted for 298 yards. Running back Kevin Richardson set a career-high with seven receptions for 122 yards and two touchdowns. Lumberjack quarterback Lance Kriesien paced the Northern Arizona offense with 171 passing and 129 rushing yards.

=== Wofford ===
	1	2	3	4	Total
Appalachian State	0	14	3	14	31
Wofford	7	7	14	14	42

A crowd of 11,042, the fourth largest in Gibbs Stadium history, saw the Terriers end the Mountaineers Division I leading winning streak at 17 games, 42–31. The Terriers outgained the Mountaineers 431 to 320 in total yardage with running back Kevious Johnson accounting for 104 rushing yards. Armanti Edwards, starting in his first game since the Michigan win, re-injured his shoulder at the start of the second half. Trey Elder replaced Edwards and threw for 105 and rushed for 33 yards. Senior wide receiver Hans Batichon had a career-high six receptions for 93 yards. The only other bright spot for the Mountaineers was CoCo Hillary's 95-yard kickoff return for a touchdown in the second quarter.

=== Elon ===
	1	2	3	4	Total
Appalachian State	7	7	7	28	49
Elon	10	0	7	15	32

The Mountaineers moved to 15–0 when running back Kevin Richardson rushes for 100 or more yards with a 49–32 win over Elon. The crowd of 13,100 was the largest in Rhodes Stadium history. Appalachian outgained Elon 526 to 371 yards with 356 yards coming from a potent ground attack. The Mountaineer defense also played an impressive game, sacking Elon freshman quarterback Scott Riddle five times. Corey Lynch blocked a Phoenix punt in second quarter and had an interception late in the game to help seal the victory.

=== Gardner–Webb ===
	1	2	3	4	Total
Gardner–Webb	7	0	0	0	7
Appalachian State	7	28	7	3	45

A record homecoming crowd of 27,428 witnessed the Mountaineers rout the Bulldogs of Gardner–Webb 45–7. Kevin Richardson's four second-quarter touchdowns put the game away early. On the day, the Mountaineers outgained the Bulldogs 466–211 in total yardage to extend their home-winning streak to 30 games.

=== Georgia Southern ===
	1	2	3	4	Total
Georgia Southern	21	10	0	7	38
Appalachian State	14	3	3	15	35

Appalachian State suffered its second loss of the year in a defeat to the Eagles of Georgia Southern, 38–35. The loss also ended the 30 game home winning streak compiled by the Mountaineers since a playoff defeat to Maine in 2002. The Eagles were led by future Walter Payton Award winner Jayson Foster. Foster lined up as quarterback, running back, and wide receiver and finished with 14 passing, 175 rushing and 41 receiving yards. Armanti Edwards made only his third start of the season, and first since September 22, and became the first quarterback in Appalachian history to rush for over 200 yards. Trailing 38–20 with less than eight minutes left to play, a Mountaineer rally came up short as Edwards fell one yard shy of converting on fourth down.

=== Furman ===
	1	2	3	4	Total
Appalachian State	14	10	7	3	34
Furman	7	0	10	10	27

Rebounding from the loss against Georgia Southern, the Mountaineers held on to defeat the Furman Paladins 34–27 in Greenville, South Carolina. The Mountaineers jumped out to a 24–7 lead at halftime only to see the Paladins roar back with 20 points in the second half. Appalachian rolled up 511 yards of offense with Armanti Edwards finishing with 337 total yards and Kevin Richardson adding 124 yards on 21 carries. Richardson become just the second player in ASU history with 4,000 career rushing yards. The game was sealed on a late Corey Lynch interception on the goal line.

=== The Citadel ===
	1	2	3	4	Total
Appalachian State	10	21	0	14	45
The Citadel	7	7	10	0	24

Armanti Edwards rushed for a school record of 291 yards, leading the Mountaineers to a 45–24 victory over The Citadel Bulldogs in Johnson Hagood Stadium. The victory moved the Mountaineers into a virtual tie for first place with Wofford.

=== Western Carolina ===
	1	2	3	4	Total
Western Carolina	7	14	0	14	35
Appalachian State	17	28	13	21	79

The Mountaineers had their highest offensive output in 71 years in a 79–35 rout over the Catamounts of Western Carolina. The crowd of 27,977 was the largest to ever witness the Battle for the Old Mountain Jug. The victory gave the Mountaineers a 53–18–1 series lead over their archrivals from Cullowhee and a 24–6 advantage since the introduction of the Old Mountain Jug. Appalachian's 743 yards of offense was the second highest in school history after the 788 gained in a 115–0 win against Piedmont in 1936. Kevin Richardson rushed for a career-high 215 yards and Armanti Edwards added 295 through the air. The Mountaineers also had a season high four interceptions and were never forced to punt.

=== Chattanooga ===
	1	2	3	4	Total
Chattanooga	7	10	0	0	17
Appalachian State	21	0	0	16	37

Kevin Richard became the Appalachian's all-time leading rusher, breaking John Settle's record, in a 37–17 victory over the Chattanooga Mocs. The Mountaineers also claimed a share of the Southern Conference title, their third straight.

=== James Madison ===
	1	2	3	4	Total
James Madison	7	7	6	7	27
Appalachian State	0	19	0	9	28

A forced fumble with 22 seconds left in the game gave the Mountaineers a 28–27 win over James Madison. The Dukes controlled the game in practically every statistical category, most notably the time of possession, which was over 40 minutes. James Madison's quarterback, Rodney Landers, led the Dukes with 253 yards of total offense. Armanti Edwards accounted for 258 total yards of offense for the Mountaineers. The Mountaineers were down 27–22 with less than two minutes remaining in the game and facing fourth down. Edwards found the end zone after completing a pass to Devon Moore to put the Mountaineers ahead 28–27. On the ensuing possession, the Dukes drove 62 yards down the field to put themselves within easy field goal range. James Madison head coach Mickey Matthews made the decision to run one more play which resulted in a fumble. Defensive end Gary Tharrington knocked the ball from the grasp of the Dukes' running back, Jamal Sullivan, and it was recovered by linebacker Pierre Banks to give the Mountaineers an improbable win in front of 14,040 fans at Kidd Brewer Stadium.

=== Eastern Washington ===
	1	2	3	4	Total
Eastern Washington	0	7	14	14	35
Appalachian State	7	14	10	7	38

Armanti Edwards accounted for 347 yards of offense and three touchdowns in leading the Mountaineers to a 38–35 victory over the Eastern Washington Eagles. Safety Corey Lynch led the defense with an interception, fumble recovery and a blocked field goal in limiting Eastern Washington's passing attack by more than 120 yards off their season average. The victory tied the Mountaineers with the Eagles of Georgia Southern as the only two programs to have 10 consecutive postseason wins in contiguous years.

=== Richmond ===
	1	2	3	4	Total
Richmond	7	14	14	0	35
Appalachian State	21	14	7	13	55

A record FCS postseason crowd of 24,140 packed Kidd Brewer Stadium to see the Mountaineers defeat the Richmond Spiders 55–35 on December 7, 2007. Armanti Edwards racked up 313 yards on the ground, setting a Division I record for rushing by a quarterback in the win. He accounted for seven touchdowns (four rushing and three passing) and 495 of the Mountaineers 617 total yards. Appalachian jumped out to an early 35–14 lead only to see the Spiders tie up the game in the third quarter. The Mountaineers responded with 20 straight points capped with an interception by senior safety Corey Lynch. With the win, Appalachian became just the fifth program in FCS history to advance to three-consecutive national title games, joining Eastern Kentucky (1979–82), Georgia Southern (1988–90 and 1998–2000), Marshall (1991–93) and Youngstown State (1991–94).

=== Delaware ===
	1	2	3	4	Total
Delaware	0	7	7	7	21
Appalachian State	14	14	7	14	49

Entering their third consecutive national championship game, the Mountaineers were looking to become the first team to win three in a row at the FCS (I-AA) level since the playoffs began in 1978. The Blue Hens of Delaware stood in the way of history. Senior running back Kevin Richardson led the way for the Mountaineers with 111 yards rushing and 27 receiving, finishing his career as Appalachian's all-time leading rusher with 4,797 yards. Accounting for three passing touchdowns, Armanti Edwards threw for 198 yards and rushed for another 98. The Blue Hens offensive attack was paced by future National Football League first round draft pick Joe Flacco at quarterback, who threw for 334 yards and one touchdown. Trey Elder, in his last game in black and gold, finished the scoring for the Mountaineers with a 53-yard scamper to make the score 49–14. Armanti Edwards finished the season with 1,948 yards passing and 1,587 yards rushing. He was 52 passing yards short of becoming only the second player in NCAA history to pass for 2,000 yards and rush for 1,000 twice. The record attendance of 23,010 on hand at Finley Stadium was the largest neutral site crowd for the NCAA Division I Championship Game.

== Roster ==
2007 Appalachian State Mountaineers football team roster
Players
Coaches
Offense

Pos.	#	Name	Class
WR	2	Dexter Jackson	Sr
WR	3	Hans Batichon	Sr
WR	7	James Hill	Jr
WR	8	Brian Quick	Fr
QB	10	Hunter Stewart	So
WR	12	T. J. Courman	Jr
QB	14	Armanti Edwards	So
QB	15	Trey Elder	Sr
WR	16	CoCo Hillary	So
SS	17	Joshua Buchanan	Sr
WR	19	Tavaris Washington	So
RB	20	Devon Moore	So
RB	21	Robert Welton	Fr
RB	26	Richard Long	Fr
LB	27	Shawn Ridder	Fr
RB	28	Kevin Richardson	Sr
WR	33	Josh Johnson	So
TE	35	Trey Hennessee	Jr
WR	37	Blake Elder	Fr
RB	44	Cedric Baker	Fr
OL	50	Nick Sloan	Fr
OL	57	Brett Irvin	Fr
OL	60	Brad Coley	Jr
OL	61	Mario Acitelli	So
OL	62	Xan Thomas	Fr
OL	63	Daniel Kilgore	Fr
OL	64	Orry Frye	Fr
OL	66	Scott Suttle	Sr
OL	67	John Holt	Sr
OL	70	Matt Ruff	Fr
OL	71	Pat Mills	Fr
OL	72	Jonathan Bieschke	Jr
OL	73	Corbett Harris	Fr
OL	75	David Guy	Fr
OL	76	Kerry Brown	Sr
OL	77	Jacob Newton	Fr
OL	79	Larry Blackwood	Sr
WR	80	Ben King	Fr
WR	81	Clay McKnight	Jr
WR	82	Josh Johnson	Sr
RB	83	Josh Smith	Fr
TE	84	Ben Jorden	Fr
WR	85	B. J. Frazier	Fr
WR	86	Jim Bob Norman	Sr
WR	87	Brandon Knox	So
TE	88	Nic Cardwell	Sr
WR		Derrick Binns	Fr
TE		Nick Vannoy	Fr

Defense

Pos.	#	Name	Class
DB	4	Anthony Cruver	Jr
DB	5	Cortez Gilbert	So
DB	6	Jerome Touchstone	Sr
LB	9	D. J. Smith	Fr
LB	11	Chase Laws	Sr
DB	18	Justin Woazeah	Sr
DB	22	Leonard Love	Jr
DB	24	Josh Davis	Jr
DB	25	Jared Reine	Fr
LB	27	Jackson. Klien	Fr
DB	29	Seth Breitenstein	Sr
LB	30	Brandon Olsen	Fr
LB	31	Pierre Banks	Jr
DB	36	Titus Howard	Sr
DB	39	Colin McDonald	Fr
LB	40	Jacque Roman	So
LB	41	Brandon Simpkins	Jr
DB	42	Travis Dowda	So
LB	43	Brandon Thompson	Fr
LB	45	Coad Westra	Fr
DL	46	Tony Robertson	So
DB	47	Corey Lynch	Sr
LB	48	Brad Hardee	Fr
LB	49	Chris Johnson	Jr
LB	51	Sherman Holt	Fr
LB	52	Michael Mitchener	Fr
DL	53	Daniel Pratl	Fr
DL	54	Jabari Fletcher	Fr
LB	55	Justin Johnson	So
DL	56	Bobby Bozzo	Fr
DL	58	Daniel Finnerty	So
DL	65	Anthony White	Fr
DL	68	Olafur Torfason	Fr
DL	78	Cory Rycroft	Jr
DB	86	Calan Lynch	Fr
DL	89	Don Maciel	Fr
DL	90	Matt Reyes	Fr
DL	92	Jason Jones	Fr
DL	93	Daniel Pratl	Fr
DL	94	Anthony Wilson	Fr
DL	95	Gordy Witte	Fr
DL	96	Gary Tharington	So
DL	98	Anthony Williams	So
DL	99	Tim Washington	Jr
LB		Jason West	Fr
DL		Josh Jurius	Fr

Special teams

Pos.	#	Name	Class
P	34	Adam Kassouf	So
PK	39	Jason Vitaris	Fr
LS	59	Russell Wilson	Sr
PK	91	Julian Rauch	Sr
P	97	Neil Young	Jr

Head coach

- Jerry Moore (19th season)

Coordinators/assistant coaches

- Shawn Elliott (offensive line, tight ends)
- Lonnie Galloway (split end wide receivers)
- Brad Glenn (slot wide receivers)
- Dale Jones (linebackers)
- Chris Moore (running backs)
- Scott Satterfield (quarterbacks)
- Mark Speir (defensive line, recruiting coordinator)
- John Wiley (defensive coordinator, defensive backs)
- Josh Robertson (Strength Coach)

Legend

- (C) Team captain
- (S) Suspended
- (I) Ineligible
- Injured
- Redshirt

== Coaching staff ==
Name	Position	Alma Mater	Year
Jerry Moore	Head coach	Baylor, 1961	19th
John Wiley	Defensive Coordinator/Defensive Backs	East Texas State, 1984	17th
Dale Jones	Linebackers	Tennessee, 1988	12th
Scott Satterfield	Quarterbacks	Appalachian State, 1996	9th
Shawn Elliott	Offensive Line	Appalachian State, 1996	11th
Chris Moore	Running Backs	Appalachian State, 1999	13th
Mark Speir	Defensive Line/Recruiting Coordinator	Clemson, 1990	5th
Lonnie Galloway	Wide Receivers (Split Ends)	Western Carolina, 1994	3rd
Brad Glenn	Wide Receivers (Slot)	Clemson, 1995	3rd
Josh Robertson	Strength Coach	East Tennessee State University, 1997	2nd

== Ranking movements ==
AP Poll

Ranking movements Legend: ██ Increase in ranking ██ Decrease in ranking — = Not ranked RV = Received votes
	Week															
Poll	Pre	1	2	3	4	5	6	7	8	9	10	11	12	13	14	Final
AP	—	—	RV	RV	—	—	—	—	—	—	—	—	—	—	—	RV

FCS polls

Ranking movements Legend: ██ Increase in ranking ██ Decrease in ranking ( ) = First-place votes
	Week													
Poll	Pre	1	2	3	4	5	6	7	8	9	10	11	12	Final
Sports Network	1 (67)	1 (88)	1 (77)	1 (90)	5 (8)	5 (2)	5 (2)	5 (3)	10	9	7	6	5	1 (119)

== Awards and honors ==
- Southern Conference Defensive Player of the Year (coaches and media) — Corey Lynch
- Southern Conference Jacobs Blocking Trophy — Kerry Brown

== Statistics ==
=== Team ===
	ASU	Opp
Scoring	641	400
Points per game	42.7	26.7
First downs	351	314
Rushing	203	160
Passing	130	132
Penalty	18	22
Total offense	7,325	5,698
Avg per play	6.7	5.2
Avg per game	488.3	379.9
Fumbles–Lost	26–13	24–12
Penalties–Yards	99–829	90–717
Avg per game	55.3	47.8

	ASU	Opp
Punts–Yards	53–1,993	81–3,147
Avg per punt	37.6	38.9
Time of possession/Game	29:22	30:38
3rd down conversions	87 for 197	85 for 222
4th down conversions	14 for 26	18 for 36
Touchdowns scored	85	53
Field goals–Attempts	17–21	10–19
PAT–Attempts	78–83	48–49
Attendance	217,968	166,868
Games/Avg per Game	9/24,219	5/33,374

==== Scores by quarter ====
	1	2	3	4	Total
Opponents	104	89	98	109	400
Mountaineers	160	224	83	174	641
