= 2007 Wofford Terriers football team =

American college football season

2007 Wofford Terriers football

SoCon co-champion

NCAA Division I Quarterfinal, L 10–21 vs. Richmond
- Conference: Southern Conference

Ranking
- Sports Network: No. 6
- Record: 9–4 (5–2 SoCon)
- Head coach: Mike Ayers (20th season)
- Home stadium: Gibbs Stadium

2007 Southern Conference football standings
	Conf.			Overall
Team	W		L	W		L
No. 1 Appalachian State +^	5	–	2	13	–	2
No. 6 Wofford +^	5	–	2	9	–	4
No. 17 Georgia Southern	4	–	3	7	–	4
No. 23 Elon	4	–	3	7	–	4
The Citadel	4	–	3	7	–	4
Furman	4	–	3	6	–	5
Chattanooga	2	–	5	2	–	9
Western Carolina	0	–	7	1	–	10
+ – Conference co-champions; ^ – FCS playoff participant; Rankings from The Sports Network poll

The 2007 Wofford Terriers football team was an American football team that represented Wofford College as a member of the Southern Conference (SoCon) during the 2007 NCAA Division I FCS football season. In their 20th year under head coach Mike Ayers, the Terriers compiled an overall record of 9–4 with a conference mark of 5–2, and finished as SoCon co-champion. Wofford advanced to the playoffs, where they defeated Montana before they lost to Richmond in the quarterfinals.

== Schedule ==
Date	Opponent	Rank	Site	Result	Attendance	Source
September 1	Georgetown (KY)*	No. 14	Gibbs Stadium; Spartanburg, SC	W 38–21	6,420	
September 8	Charleston Southern*	No. 14	Gibbs Stadium; Spartanburg, SC	W 52–24	5,879	
September 15	at NC State*	No. 11	Carter–Finley Stadium; Raleigh, NC	L 17–38	56,039	
September 22	No. 1 Appalachian State	No. 13	Gibbs Stadium; Spartanburg, SC	W 42–31	11,042	
September 29	at No. 20 Furman	No. 8	Paladin Stadium; Greenville, SC (rivalry)	W 45–20	15,701	
October 6	at The Citadel	No. 8	Johnson Hagood Stadium; Charleston, SC (rivalry)	W 28–7	14,879	
October 13	Gardner–Webb*	No. 8	Gibbs Stadium; Spartanburg, SC	W 52–17	6,218	
October 20	No. 24 Elon	No. 7	Gibbs Stadium; Spartanburg, SC	L 13–24	8,229	
October 25	at Western Carolina	No. 11	Whitmire Stadium; Cullowhee, NC	W 47–44	4,721	
November 3	No. 17 Georgia Southern	No. 10	Gibbs Stadium; Spartanburg, SC	L 35–38	12,124	
November 10	at Chattanooga	No. 15	Finley Stadium; Chattanooga, TN	W 42–16	4,907	
November 24	at No. 3 Montana*	No. 11	Washington–Grizzly Stadium; Missoula, MT (NCAA Division I First Round)	W 23–22	19,761	
December 1	No. 6 Richmond*	No. 11	Gibbs Stadium; Spartanburg, SC (NCAA Division I Quarterfinal)	L 10–21	8,500	
*Non-conference game; Rankings from The Sports Network Poll released prior to the game
