= 2007 Georgia Southern Eagles football team =

American college football season

2007 Georgia Southern Eagles football
- Conference: Southern Conference

Ranking
- Coaches: No. 18
- Sports Network: No. 17
- Record: 7–4 (4–3 SoCon)
- Head coach: Chris Hatcher (1st season)
- Offensive coordinator: Rance Gillespie (1st season)
- Offensive scheme: Triple option
- Defensive coordinator: Ashley Anders (1st season)
- Base defense: 4–3
- Home stadium: Paulson Stadium

2007 Southern Conference football standings
	Conf.			Overall
Team	W		L	W		L
No. 1 Appalachian State +^	5	–	2	13	–	2
No. 6 Wofford +^	5	–	2	9	–	4
No. 17 Georgia Southern	4	–	3	7	–	4
No. 23 Elon	4	–	3	7	–	4
The Citadel	4	–	3	7	–	4
Furman	4	–	3	6	–	5
Chattanooga	2	–	5	2	–	9
Western Carolina	0	–	7	1	–	10
+ – Conference co-champions; ^ – FCS playoff participant; Rankings from The Sports Network FCS Poll

The 2007 Georgia Southern Eagles football team represented Georgia Southern University as a member of the Southern Conference (SoCon) during the 2007 NCAA Division I FCS football season. Led by first-year head coach Chris Hatcher, the Eagles compiled an overall record of 7–4 with a mark of 4–3 in conference play, placing in a four-way tie for third in the SoCon. Georgia Southern played home games at Paulson Stadium in Statesboro, Georgia.

== Schedule ==
Date	Time	Opponent	Rank	Site	TV	Result	Attendance	Source
September 8	6:00 pm	West Georgia*		Paulson Stadium; Statesboro, GA		W 45–21	21,489	
September 15	7:00 pm	at Coastal Carolina*		Brooks Stadium; Conway, SC	SS	W 42–34	8,448	
September 22	7:00 pm	Chattanooga		Paulson Stadium; Statesboro, GA	CSS	L 38–45 ^{OT}	18,785	
September 29	3:30 pm	Western Carolina		Paulson Stadium; Statesboro, GA	CSS	W 50–21	15,486	
October 6	2:00 pm	South Dakota State*		Paulson Stadium; Statesboro, GA		W 41–38	15,912	
October 13	3:00 pm	at Elon	No. 21	Rhodes Stadium; Elon, NC	SS	L 33–36 ^{2OT}	5,429	
October 20	3:30 pm	at No. 5 Appalachian State		Kidd Brewer Stadium; Boone, NC (rivalry)	MASN	W 38–35	28,202	
October 27	12:00 pm	No. 25 The Citadel^{†}	No. 22	Paulson Stadium; Statesboro, GA	CSS	W 21–17	18,506	
November 3	1:30 pm	at No. 10 Wofford	No. 17	Gibbs Stadium; Spartanburg, SC		W 38–35	12,124	
November 10	3:30 pm	Furman	No. 11	Paulson Stadium; Statesboro, GA	SS	L 22–24	23,373	
November 17	2:00 pm	at Colorado State*		Hughes Stadium; Fort Collins, CO		L 34–42	14,332	
*Non-conference game; ^{†}Homecoming; Rankings from The Sports Network Poll released prior to the game; All times are in Eastern time

== Game summaries ==
=== West Georgia ===
It was a successful coaching debut for Chris Hatcher, who took over as Eagles coach after winning a national championship at Valdosta State in NCAA Division II. He was brought on to restore Georgia Southern's prestige as a Football Championship Subdivision powerhouse again after finishing 3–8 last season, the last when the division was recognized as 1-AA.

	1	2	3	4	Total
West Georgia	7	14	0	0	21
Georgia Southern	10	0	14	21	45

=== Coastal Carolina ===
Jayson Foster ran for 253 yards and six touchdowns to lead Georgia Southern past Coastal Carolina 42–34 on Saturday night...The Eagles (2v0) also got 206 yards from Lamar Lewis on 18 carries, including a 63-yard run.

	1	2	3	4	Total
Georgia Southern	14	7	0	21	42
Coastal Carolina	7	7	7	13	34

=== Chattanooga ===
It was the Southern Conference opener for both teams. Georgia Southern (2–1, 0–1) got another outstanding night from quarterback Jayson Foster who rushed for 210 yards and completed 16 of 19 passes for 120 yards.

	1	2	3	4	OT	Total
Chattanooga	14	3	14	7	7	45
Georgia Southern	7	7	14	10	0	38

=== Western Carolina ===
Jayson Foster ran for one touchdown and threw for another while completing all 10 of his passes to lead Georgia Southern to a 50–21 Southern Conference victory over Western Carolina on Saturday. Foster, who led Division I Football Championship Subdivision rushers with an average of 231.2 yards per game, had only 96 yards rushing, but he was effective throwing the football. The 5-foot-9, 164-pound senior was 10-for-10 passing for 147 yards, including a 29-yard scoring pass to Michael McIntosh. Foster is now 27-for-30 in his last two games and his perfect performance against the Catamounts was a new school single game completion record.

	1	2	3	4	Total
Western Carolina	0	0	7	14	21
Georgia Southern	10	17	3	20	50

=== South Dakota State ===
Jesse Hartley kicked a 54-yard field goal on the final play of the game to give Georgia Southern a 41–38 victory over South Dakota State on Saturday....Hartley's game winning kick, a career long, was set up by an interception by Carson Hill with 21 seconds remaining. The Jackrabbits got the ball back with 31 seconds to play and the score tied but chose not to sit on it.

	1	2	3	4	Total
South Dakota State	0	7	17	14	38
Georgia Southern	14	17	0	10	41

=== Elon ===
The Phoenix (4–2, 2–1 Southern Conference) beat the Eagles for the first time in eight games....Hartley, who made a 49-yard try in the second quarter as one of his four field goals, missed a 38-yard attempt in the second overtime as the Eagles gained only 4 yards in three downs. The Phoenix actually lost 7 yards in three plays before Wilcox made the winning kick.

	1	2	3	4	OT	2OT	Total
Georgia Southern	7	6	10	7	3	0	33
Elon	3	17	3	7	3	3	36

=== Appalachian State ===
Lamar Lewis ran for 74 yards and two touchdowns, including a key fourth-quarter score, as Georgia Southern held off an Appalachian State rally Saturday and took a 38–35 victory in the Southern Conference.

	1	2	3	4	Total
Georgia Southern	21	10	0	7	38
Appalachian State	14	3	3	15	35

=== The Citadel ===
Jayson Foster scored a pair touchdowns in the fourth quarter to help Georgia Southern rally late in a 21–17 win over The Citadel on Saturday....Foster also completed 11-of-16 passes for 106 yards. Lamar Lewis chipped in on the running game, gaining 82 yards on 18 carries.

	1	2	3	4	Total
The Citadel	7	7	3	0	17
Georgia Southern	3	0	3	15	21

=== Wofford ===
Jayson Foster had 279 rushing yards and three touchdowns to lead Georgia Southern a 38–35 victory over Wofford on Saturday....With the game tied at 35, Georgia Southern (7–2, 4–2 Southern Conference) had a 45-yard kickoff return to set up the game-winning field goal with 8:58 left in the game.

	1	2	3	4	Total
Georgia Southern	14	14	0	10	38
Wofford	14	0	14	7	35

=== Furman ===
	1	2	3	4	Total
Furman	3	7	14	0	24
Georgia Southern	0	15	0	7	22

=== Colorado State ===
Gartrell Johnson ran for two touchdowns and caught a touchdown pass, leading Colorado State to a 42–34 victory over Georgia Southern Saturday. Johnson finished with 136 yards on the ground. Caleb Hanie completed 13-of-16 passes for 244 yards and two touchdowns, and Damon Morton caught four passes for 100 yards and a score for Colorado State (2–9)....Quarterback Jayson Foster ran for 195 yards on 27 carries and scored three touchdowns for the Eagles. He also threw for 107 yards for Georgia Southern (7-4).

	1	2	3	4	Total
Georgia Southern	0	3	14	17	34
Colorado State	7	21	7	7	42
