= Appalachian State Mountaineers football statistical leaders =

The Appalachian State Mountaineers football statistical leaders are individual statistical leaders of the Appalachian State Mountaineers football program in various categories, including passing, rushing, receiving, total offense, defensive stats, kicking, and scoring. Within those areas, the lists identify single-game, single-season, and career leaders. The Mountaineers represent Appalachian State University in the NCAA Division I FBS Sun Belt Conference.

Although Appalachian State began competing in intercollegiate football in 1928, the school's official record book considers the "modern era" to have begun in 1957. Records from before this year are often incomplete and inconsistent, and they are generally not included in these lists.

These lists are dominated by more recent players for several reasons:

- Since 1957, seasons in the top level of college football, now Division I FBS, have increased from 10 games to 11 and then 12 games in length.
- From 1982 through 2013, Appalachian State played in the second level of Division I football, currently known as Division I FCS (known before the 2006 season as Division I-AA). While regular seasons at that level would not expand to the FBS limit of 12 games until the 2026 season, normally being restricted to 11, two aspects of FCS rules have allowed for more games.
  - The NCAA organizes an FCS championship tournament, currently called the NCAA Division I Football Championship. The Mountaineers reached the FCS playoffs 20 times, playing 41 games, between 1986 and 2012 (they were ineligible for the 2013 playoffs due to their FBS transition), giving many players extra games to accumulate statistics. The NCAA did not count I-AA/FCS playoff games toward official season statistics until 2002. Since 2006, Appalachian has not included statistics from pre-2002 playoff games (19 in all) when compiling single-season and career records.
  - Additionally, pre-2026 NCAA rules allowed FCS teams to schedule 12 regular-season games in years when the period starting with the Thursday before Labor Day and ending with the final Saturday in November contains 14 Saturdays.
- The NCAA did not count bowl games toward official season statistics until 2002 (at that time, Appalachian was in what is now known as FCS). The Mountaineers have appeared in eight bowl games since first becoming eligible for such games in the 2015 season.
- The Sun Belt Conference has held a championship game since 2018. Appalachian State played in and won the first two title games (2018 and 2019), providing yet another game for players to accumulate statistics in those seasons.
- The NCAA didn't allow freshmen to play varsity football until 1972 (with the exception of the World War II years), allowing players to have four-year careers.
- Since 2018, players have been allowed to participate in as many as four games in a redshirt season; previously, playing in even one game "burned" the redshirt. Since 2024, postseason games have not counted against the four-game limit. These changes to redshirt rules have given very recent players several extra games to accumulate statistics.
- Due to COVID-19 issues, the NCAA ruled that the 2020 season would not count against the athletic eligibility of any football player, giving everyone who played in that season the opportunity for five years of eligibility instead of the normal four.

These lists are updated through the 2025 season.

== Passing ==
=== Passing yards ===
Career
Rk	Player	Yards	Years
1	Armanti Edwards	10,392	2006 2007 2008 2009
2	Taylor Lamb	9,655	2014 2015 2016 2017
3	Richie Williams	7,759	2002 2003 2004 2005
4	Zac Thomas	6,979	2017 2018 2019 2020
5	Joey Aguilar	6,760	2023 2024
6	Steve Brown	6,533	1977 1978 1979 1980
7	Chase Brice	6,258	2021 2022
8	Jamal Londry-Jackson	5,971	2010 2011 2012 2013
9	Joe Burchette	5,427	1999 2000 2001 2002
10	D. J. Campbell	5,414	1989 1990 1991 1992

Single season
Rk	Player	Yards	Year
1	Joey Aguilar	3,757	2023
2	Chase Brice	3,337	2021
3	Armanti Edwards	3,291	2009
4	Jamal Londry-Jackson	3,278	2012
5	Richie Williams	3,109	2004
6	Joey Aguilar	3,003	2024
7	Chase Brice	2,921	2022
8	Armanti Edwards	2,902	2008
9	Richie Williams	2,809	2005
10	Zac Thomas	2,718	2019

Single game
Rk	Player	Yards	Year	Opponent
1	Armanti Edwards	433	2008	South Carolina State
2	Taylor Lamb	427	2017	Coastal Carolina
3	Joey Aguilar	424	2024	East Carolina
4	Armanti Edwards	415	2009	Wofford
5	Richie Williams	413	2004	Furman
6	Richie Williams	410	2004	Chattanooga
7	Steve Brown	408	1980	East Tennessee State
	Richie Williams	408	2004	Elon
9	Richie Williams	405	2004	Wofford
10	Taylor Lamb	397	2014	Liberty

=== Passing touchdowns ===
Career
Rk	Player	TDs	Years
1	Taylor Lamb	90	2014 2015 2016 2017
2	Armanti Edwards	74	2006 2007 2008 2009
3	Zac Thomas	69	2017 2018 2019 2020
4	Richie Williams	59	2002 2003 2004 2005
5	Joey Aguilar	56	2023 2024
6	Chase Brice	54	2021 2022
7	Pat Murphy	46	1999 2000 2001 2002
	Joe Burchette	46	1965 1966 1967 1968

Single season
Rk	Player	TDs	Year
1	Joey Aguilar	33	2023
2	Taylor Lamb	31	2015
3	Armanti Edwards	30	2008
4	Zac Thomas	28	2019
5	Taylor Lamb	27	2017
	Chase Brice	27	2021
	Chase Brice	27	2022
8	Richie Williams	24	2004
9	Pat Murphy	23	1968
	Joey Aguilar	23	2024

Single game
Rk	Player	TDs	Year	Opponent
1	Chase Brice	6	2022	North Carolina
2	Pat Murphy	5	1967	Presbyterian
	Pat Murphy	5	1968	Wofford
	Richie Williams	5	2004	Northwestern State
	Armanti Edwards	5	2008	Wofford
	Jamal Londry-Jackson	5	2010	The Citadel
	Taylor Lamb	5	2017	Savannah State
8	28 times by 10 players	4	Most recent: JJ Kohl, 2025 vs. Georgia State	

== Rushing ==
=== Rushing yards ===
Career
Rk	Player	Yards	Years
1	Marcus Cox	5,103	2013 2014 2015 2016
2	Kevin Richardson	4,804	2004 2005 2006 2007
3	John Settle	4,409	1983 1984 1985 1986
4	Armanti Edwards	4,361	2006 2007 2008 2009
5	Damon Scott	3,800	1993 1994 1995 1996
6	Jalin Moore	3,570	2015 2016 2017 2018
7	Chip Hooks	3,472	1991 1992 1993 1994
8	Nate Noel	3,076	2020 2021 2022 2023
9	Ritchie Melchor	2,918	1986 1987 1988 1989
10	Darrynton Evans	2,884	2017 2018 2019

Single season
Rk	Player	Yards	Year
1	Kevin Richardson	1,676	2006
2	John Settle	1,661	1986
3	Armanti Edwards	1,588	2007
4	Darrynton Evans	1,480	2019
5	Damon Scott	1,466	1996
6	Kevin Richardson	1,433	2005
7	Marcus Cox	1,423	2015
8	Marcus Cox	1,415	2014
9	Jalin Moore	1,402	2016
10	Devon Moore	1,374	2009

Single game
Rk	Player	Yards	Year	Opponent
1	Camerun Peoples	317	2020	North Texas (Myrtle Beach Bowl)
2	Armanti Edwards	313	2007	Richmond (FCS semifinal)
3	Armanti Edwards	291	2007	The Citadel
4	Ritchie Melchor	267	1989	Chattanooga
5	DeAndre Presley	264	2010	Western Illinois
6	Jack Groce	259	1951	Newberry
7	Jalin Moore	257	2016	Akron
8	Marcus Cox	250	2014	Georgia State
9	John Settle	245	1986	Furman
	Steven Miller	245	2012	Western Carolina

=== Rushing touchdowns ===
Career
Rk	Player	TDs	Years
1	Kevin Richardson	66	2004 2005 2006 2007
2	Armanti Edwards	65	2006 2007 2008 2009
3	Marcus Cox	52	2013 2014 2015 2016
4	John Settle	43	1983 1984 1985 1986
5	Devon Moore	40	2006 2007 2008 2009 2010
6	Damon Scott	38	1993 1994 1995 1996
7	Jalin Moore	33	2015 2016 2017 2018
	Camerun Peoples	33	2018 2019 2020 2021 2022
9	Darrynton Evans	25	2017 2018 2019
	DeAndre Presley	25	2008 2009 2010 2011

Single season
Rk	Player	TDs	Year
1	Kevin Richardson	30	2006
2	Armanti Edwards	21	2007
3	John Settle	20	1986
4	Kevin Richardson	19	2005
	Devon Moore	19	2009
	Marcus Cox	19	2014
7	Armanti Edwards	18	2009
	Darrynton Evans	18	2019
9	Armanti Edwards	15	2006
	Marcus Cox	15	2013

Single game
Rk	Player	TDs	Year	Opponent
1	John Settle	5	1986	Davidson
	Camerun Peoples	5	2020	North Texas (Myrtle Beach Bowl)

== Receiving ==
=== Receptions ===
Career
Rk	Player	Rec	Years
1	Thomas Hennigan	242	2017 2018 2019 2020 2021
2	Andrew Peacock	208	2010 2011 2012 2013
3	Brian Quick	202	2007 2008 2009 2010
4	DaVon Fowlkes	200	2001 2002 2003 2004
5	Malik Williams	190	2017 2018 2019 2020 2021
6	Rick Beasley	178	1978 1979 1980
7	Ike Lewis	158	2014 2015 2016 2017
8	Matt Cline	151	2006 2007 2008 2009
9	Kaedin Robinson	147	2022 2023 2024
10	Bob Agle	146	1965 1966 1967 1968
	Corey Sutton	146	2018 2019 2021

Single season
Rk	Player	Rec	Year
1	DaVon Fowlkes	103	2004
2	Matt Cline	85	2009
3	Sean Price	81	2012
4	Andrew Peacock	79	2012
5	Andrew Peacock	78	2013
6	Rick Beasley	74	1979
7	Brian Quick	71	2011
8	Bob Agle	68	1968
9	Kaedin Robinson	67	2023
10	William Mayfield	64	2006
	Tony Washington	64	2013

Single game
Rk	Player	Rec	Year	Opponent
1	DaVon Fowlkes	17	2004	Elon
2	DaVon Fowlkes	15	2004	Wofford
3	Rick Beasley	14	1979	Marshall
	DaVon Fowlkes	14	2004	Furman
5	Bob Agle	13	1968	Emory & Henry
	Sean Price	13	2012	Illinois State
	Jaden Barnes	13	2025	Georgia Southern
8	Gerard Hardy	12	1997	Liberty
	DaVon Fowlkes	12	2004	Chattanooga
	Andrew Peacock	12	2013	Georgia

=== Receiving yards ===
Career
Rk	Player	Yards	Years
1	Brian Quick	3,418	2007 2008 2009 2010 2011
2	Rick Beasley	3,124	1978 1979 1980
	Thomas Hennigan	3,124	2017 2018 2019 2020 2021
4	DaVon Fowlkes	2,960	2001 2002 2003 2004
5	Malik Williams	2,382	2017 2018 2019 2020 2021
6	Corey Sutton	2,278	2018 2019 2021
7	Kaedin Robinson	2,164	2022 2023 2024
8	Bob Agle	2,151	1965 1966 1967 1968
9	Andrew Peacock	2,108	2010 2011 2012 2013
10	Daryl Skinner	1,942	1997 1998 1999

Single season
Rk	Player	Yards	Year
1	DaVon Fowlkes	1,618	2004
2	Rick Beasley	1,205	1979
3	Sean Price	1,196	2012
4	William Mayfield	1,129	2006
5	Brian Quick	1,096	2011
6	Bob Agle	1,084	1968
7	Brian Quick	982	2009
8	Matt Cline	981	2009
9	Rick Beasley	971	1978

Single game
Rk	Player	Yards	Year	Opponent
1	DaVon Fowlkes	280	2004	Elon
2	Bob Agle	261	1968	Wofford
3	DaVon Fowlkes	236	2004	Chattanooga
4	Rick Beasley	231	1980	James Madison
	Sean Price	231	2012	Georgia Southern
6	Rick Beasley	220	1980	East Tennessee State
7	Malik Williams	206	2021	Coastal Carolina
8	DaVon Fowlkes	202	2004	Wofford
9	William Mayfield	195	2006	Chattanooga
10	DaVon Fowlkes	191	2004	Northwestern State

=== Receiving touchdowns ===
Career
Rk	Player	TDs	Years
1	Brian Quick	31	2007 2008 2009 2010 2011
2	Bob Agle	25	1965 1966 1967 1968
3	Corey Sutton	24	2018 2019 2021
4	Rick Beasley	23	1978 1979 1980
	Thomas Hennigan	23	2017 2018 2019 2020 2021
6	DaVon Fowlkes	22	2001 2002 2003 2004
7	Dexter Jackson	17	2004 2005 2006 2007
	Malik Williams	17	2017 2018 2019 2020 2021
9	Jaden Barnes	16	2021 2022 2023 2024 2025
10	Daniel Bettis	14	2002 2003 2004 2005 2006
	Ben Jorden	14	2008 2009 2010 2011
	Barrett Burns	14	2013 2014 2015 2016
	Kaedin Robinson	14	2022 2023 2024

Single season
Rk	Player	TDs	Year
1	DaVon Fowlkes	14	2004
2	Bob Agle	13	1968
3	Rick Beasley	12	1979
4	Brian Quick	11	2011
5	Corey Sutton	10	2018
	Kaedin Robinson	10	2023
7	Brian Quick	9	2010
8	Richard Agle	8	1972
	Troy Albea	8	2000
	Daniel Bettis	8	2005
	Dexter Jackson	8	2007
	Sean Price	8	2012
	Barrett Burns	8	2015
	Ike Lewis	8	2017

Single game
Rk	Player	TDs	Year	Opponent
1	Bob Agle	4	1968	Wofford
	DaVon Fowlkes	4	2004	Northwestern State
	Thomas Hennigan	4	2017	Louisiana

== Total offense ==
Total offense is the sum of passing and rushing statistics. It does not include receiving or returns.

=== Total offense yards ===
Career
Rk	Player	Yards	Years
1	Armanti Edwards	14,753	2006 2007 2008 2009
2	Taylor Lamb	11,619	2014 2015 2016 2017
3	Richie Williams	9,370	2002 2003 2004 2005
4	Zac Thomas	8,280	2017 2018 2019 2020
5	Joey Aguilar	7,216	2023 2024
6	Steve Brown	7,129	1977 1978 1979 1980
7	Jamal Londry-Jackson	6,718	2010 2011 2012 2013
8	Chase Brice	6,524	2021 2022
9	D. J. Campbell	6,182	1989 1990 1991 1992
10	Joe Burchette	5,731	1999 2000 2001 2002

Single season
Rk	Player	Yards	Year
1	Joey Aguilar	4,006	2023
2	Armanti Edwards	3,970	2009
3	Armanti Edwards	3,843	2008
4	Richie Williams	3,745	2005
5	DeAndre Presley	3,670	2010
6	Jamal Londry-Jackson	3,606	2012
7	Armanti Edwards	3,536	2007
8	Chase Brice	3,486	2021
9	Armanti Edwards	3,404	2006
10	Richie Williams	3,393	2004

Single game
Rk	Player	Yards	Year	Opponent
1	Richie Williams	517	2004	Chattanooga
2	Armanti Edwards	495	2007	Richmond (FCS semifinal)
3	Armanti Edwards	481	2008	South Carolina State
4	Armanti Edwards	461	2009	Furman
5	Taylor Lamb	452	2017	Coastal Carolina
	Joey Aguilar	452	2024	East Carolina
7	Richie Williams	448	2004	Elon
8	Richie Williams	440	2004	Furman
	Armanti Edwards	440	2008	Wofford
10	Armanti Edwards	439	2007	The Citadel

=== Touchdowns responsible for ===
"Touchdowns responsible for" is the official NCAA term for combined passing and rushing touchdowns.

Career
Rk	Player	TDs	Years
1	Armanti Edwards	139	2006 2007 2008 2009
2	Taylor Lamb	108	2014 2015 2016 2017
3	Zac Thomas	88	2017 2018 2019 2020
4	Richie Williams	81	2002 2003 2004 2005
5	Kevin Richardson	66	2004 2005 2006 2007

Single season
Rk	Player	TDs	Year
1	Armanti Edwards	41	2008
2	Armanti Edwards	38	2007
3	Taylor Lamb	36	2015
	Joey Aguilar	36	2023
5	DeAndre Presley	35	2010
	Zac Thomas	35	2019
7	Richie Williams	32	2004
	Taylor Lamb	32	2017

Single game
Rk	Player	TDs	Year	Opponent
1	Armanti Edwards	7	2007	Richmond
2	Pat Murphy	6	1968	Wofford
	Richie Williams	6	2004	Chattanooga
	Armanti Edwards	6	2008	The Citadel
	Armanti Edwards	6	2008	Wofford
	Armanti Edwards	6	2009	Furman
	Chase Brice	6	2022	North Carolina

== Defense ==
=== Interceptions ===
Career
Rk	Player	Ints	Years
1	Larry Harbin	25	1961 1962 1963 1964
2	Corey Lynch	24	2003 2004 2005 2006 2007
3	Mark LeGree	22	2007 2008 2009 2010
4	Wayne Byrd	20	1963 1964 1965 1966
5	Matt Stevens	18	1992 1993 1994 1995
6	Dave Richardson	14	1965 1966 1967 1968
7	Corey Hall	13	1997 1998 1999 2000
8	David Neeld	12	1988 1989 1990 1991
	Struggy Smith	12	1982 1983 1984 1985
	Mark Mayo	12	1967 1968 1969 1970

Single season
Rk	Player	Ints	Year
1	Mark LeGree	10	2008
2	Larry Harbin	8	1963
3	Larry Harbin	7	1964
	Wayne Byrd	7	1965
	Wayne Byrd	7	1966
	Matt Stevens	7	1994
	Mark LeGree	7	2009
	Latrell Gibbs	7	2015
9	7 times by 5 players	6	Most recent: Clifton Duck, 2017

Single game
Rk	Player	Ints	Year	Opponent
1	Larry McKenzie	3	1973	Davidson
	Mark LeGree	3	2008	Wofford
	Clifton Duck	3	2017	New Mexico State
	Tae Hayes	3	2017	New Mexico State
	Steven Jones Jr.	3	2021	Arkansas State

=== Tackles ===
Career
Rk	Player	Tackles	Years
1	Dexter Coakley	616	1993 1994 1995 1996
2	D. J. Smith	525	2007 2008 2009 2010
3	Cedric Felton	495	1982 1983 1984 1985 1986
4	Jacque Roman	408	2006 2007 2008 2009
5	Jeremy Wiggins	393	2003 2004 2005 2006
6	Brent David	391	1989 1990 1991 1992 1993
7	Joe DiBernardo	383	1993 1994 1995 1996
8	Pierre Banks	373	2004 2005 2006 2007 2008
9	Dino Hackett	372	1982 1983 1984 1985
10	Corey Lynch	358	2003 2004 2005 2006 2007

Single season
Rk	Player	Tackles	Year
1	Dino Hackett	200	1985
2	Dexter Coakley	166	1996
3	Dexter Coakley	159	1993
4	Cedric Felton	151	1985
5	Dexter Coakley	150	1995
6	D. J. Smith	144	2010
7	Jeremy Kimbrough	143	2012
8	Dexter Coakley	141	1994
9	Van Smith	140	1981
10	D. J. Smith	137	2009

Single game
Rk	Player	Tackles	Year	Opponent
1	Dino Hackett	27	1985	East Tennessee State
2	Julius Thomas	25	1973	Lenoir-Rhyne
3	Dino Hackett	24	1985	Furman
	Dexter Coakley	24	1993	VMI
5	Dino Hackett	23	1985	The Citadel
6	George Myers	22	1973	Furman
	Dino Hackett	22	1985	James Madison
	Marvin Hodge	22	1995	Georgia Southern

=== Sacks ===
Career
Rk	Player	Sacks	Years
1	Josh Jeffries	36.0	1999 2000 2001 2002
2	Marques Murrell	36.5	2003 2004 2005 2006
3	K. T. Stovall	29.5	2000 2001 2002 2003
4	Nick Hampton	26.5	2018 2019 2020 2021 2022
5	Demetrius Taylor	26.0	2017 2018 2019 2020 2021
6	Rocky Hunt	24.0	1996 1997 1998
7	Avery Hall	23.5	1989 1990 1991 1992
8	Sean Swoope	22.5	1989 1990 1991 1992
	Jason Hunter	22.5	2001 2002 2003 2004 2005
10	Darren Wilson	22.0	1979 1980 1981 1982
	Jabari Fletcher	22.0	2007 2008 2009 2010

Single season
Rk	Player	Sacks	Year
1	Jason Hunter	13.0	2005
	Marques Murrell	13.0	2005
	Marques Murrell	13.0	2006
4	Josh Jeffries	12.0	2001
5	William Peebles	11.5	1994
6	Nick Hampton	11.0	2021
7	Chip Miller	10.5	1994
	Rocky Hunt	10.5	1998
9	Steve Carson	10.0	1997
	K. T. Stovall	10.0	2002

Single game
Rk	Player	Sacks	Year	Opponent
1	Rayford Cannon	5.0	1986	Davidson

== Kicking ==
=== Field goals made ===
Career
Rk	Player	FGs	Years
1	Chandler Staton	64	2017 2018 2019 2020 2021
2	Björn Nittmo	55	1985 1986 1987 1988
3	Julian Rauch	42	2004 2005 2006 2007
4	Jay Millson	41	1989 1990 1991 1992
5	Jay Sutton	40	1993 1994 1995 1996

Single season
Rk	Player	FGs	Year
1	Dominic De Freitas	21	2025
2	Chandler Staton	20	2021
3	Jason Vitaris	19	2009
	Michael Hughes	19	2023
5	Björn Nittmo	18	1988
6	Björn Nittmo	17	1986
	Björn Nittmo	17	1987
	Julian Rauch	17	2007

Single game
Rk	Player	FGs	Year	Opponent
1	Drew Stewart	6	2011	Western Carolina
2	Dominic De Freitas	5	2025	Arkansas State
3	Björn Nittmo	4	1986	The Citadel
	Björn Nittmo	4	1987	Wake Forest
	Björn Nittmo	4	1988	Gardner-Webb
	Jay Millson	4	1991	Furman
	Michael Hughes	4	2022	Georgia Southern
	Michael Hughes	4	2023	Wyoming
	James London	4	2026	James Madison

=== Field goal percentage ===
Career
Rk	Player	FG%	Years
1	Michael Hughes	83.3%	2021 2022 2023 2024
2	Chandler Staton	79.0%	2017 2018 2019 2020 2021
3	Dominic De Freitas	77.8%	2025
4	Jay Sutton	75.5%	1993 1994 1995 1996
5	Erik Rockhold	75.0%	2000 2001 2002 2003
6	Björn Nittmo	74.3%	1985 1986 1987 1988
7	Jason Vitaris	73.1%	2007 2008 2009 2010
8	Julian Rauch	68.9%	2004 2005 2006 2007

Single season
Rk	Player	FG%	Year
1	Chandler Staton	95.2%	2021
2	Jason Vitaris	91.7%	2010
3	Jay Sutton	86.7%	1996
4	Michael Hughes	86.4%	2023
5	Julian Rauch	81.0%	2007
6	Jay Millson	80.0%	1989
7	Dominic De Freitas	77.8%	2025
8	Björn Nittmo	77.3%	1987
9	Erik Rockhold	76.9%	2001
10	Chandler Staton	75.0%	2018
	Gary Davis	75.0%	1988
	Björn Nittmo	75.0%	1975
	Michael Hughes	75.0%	2022

== Scoring (points) ==
App State's record books include leaders in points scored over all relevant time frames (career, single-season, and single-game), but do not list leaders in total touchdowns scored (as opposed to "touchdowns responsible for", listed in the "Total offense" section).

Career
Rank	Player	Points	Years
1	Chandler Staton	464	2017 2018 2019 2020 2021
2	Kevin Richardson	444	2004 2005 2006 2007
3	Armanti Edwards	392	2006 2007 2008 2009
4	Julian Rauch	373	2004 2005 2006 2007
5	Marcus Cox	366	2013 2014 2015 2016
6	Jason Vitaris	293	2007 2008 2009 2010
7	John Settle	268	1983 1984 1985 1986
8	Damon Scott	250	1993 1994 1995 1996
	Björn Nittmo	250	1985 1986 1987 1988
10	Devon Moore	240	2006 2007 2008 2009 2010

Single season
Rank	Player	Points	Year
1	Kevin Richardson	186	2006
2	Darrynton Evans	144	2019
3	Julian Rauch	127	2007
4	Kevin Richardson	126	2005
	Kevin Richardson	126	2007
	Armanti Edwards	126	2007
	Marcus Cox	126	2013
8	John Settle	120	1986
9	Chandler Staton	117	2021
10	Jason Vitaris	115	2009

Single game
Rank	Player	Points	Year	Opponent
1	Len Wilson	32	1936	Guilford
2	John Settle	30	1986	Davidson
	Camerun Peoples	30	2020	North Texas (Myrtle Beach Bowl)
3	15 times by 11 players	24	Most recent: Jaquari Lewis, 2026 vs. Coastal Carolina	
