= List of Appalachian State Mountaineers in the NFL draft =

This is a list of Appalachian State Mountaineers football players in the NFL draft.

== Key ==
B	Back	K	Kicker	NT	Nose tackle
C	Center	LB	Linebacker	FB	Fullback
DB	Defensive back	P	Punter	HB	Halfback
DE	Defensive end	QB	Quarterback	WR	Wide receiver
DT	Defensive tackle	RB	Running back	G	Guard
E	End	T	Offensive tackle	TE	Tight end

== Selections ==
Year	Round	Pick	Overall	Player	Team	Position
1942	17	6	156	George Watts	Washington Redskins	T
1948	13	10	115	John Hollar	Chicago Cardinals	B
1949	16	9	160	Tom Murdock	Chicago Cardinals	B
1964	10	6	132	Larry Hand	Detroit Lions	DT
1965	8	11	109	Larry Harbin	Detroit Lions	B
1984	9	12	236	Leroy Howell	Buffalo Bills	DE
1986	2	8	35	Dino Hackett	Kansas City Chiefs	LB
1988	10	16	265	Steve Wilkes	New York Giants	TE
1990	5	15	125	Derrick Graham	Kansas City Chiefs	T
1990	7	28	194	Keith Collins	San Diego Chargers	DB
1992	5	10	122	Gary Dandridge	Seattle Seahawks	DB
1992	7	10	178	Mike Frier	Seattle Seahawks	DT
1993	3	11	67	Harold Alexander	Atlanta Falcons	P
1996	3	26	87	Matt Stevens	Buffalo Bills	DB
1997	3	5	65	Dexter Coakley	Dallas Cowboys	LB
2001	7	15	215	Corey Hall	Atlanta Falcons	DB
2008	2	27	58	Dexter Jackson	Tampa Bay Buccaneers	WR
2008	6	11	177	Corey Lynch	Cincinnati Bengals	DB
2010	3	25	59	Armanti Edwards	Carolina Panthers	QB
2011	5	25	156	Mark LeGree	Seattle Seahawks	DB
2011	5	32	163	Daniel Kilgore	San Francisco 49ers	G
2011	6	21	186	D. J. Smith	Green Bay Packers	LB
2012	2	1	33	Brian Quick	St. Louis Rams	WR
2013	5	32	165	Sam Martin	Detroit Lions	P
2013	7	4	210	Demetrius McCray	Jacksonville Jaguars	DB
2016	5	3	142	Ronald Blair	San Francisco 49ers	DE
2018	6	39	213	Colby Gossett	Minnesota Vikings	G
2020	3	29	93	Darrynton Evans	Tennessee Titans	RB
2020	4	1	107	Akeem Davis-Gaither	Cincinnati Bengals	LB
2021	5	34	178	Shemar Jean-Charles	Green Bay Packers	DB
2022	5	28	161	D'Marco Jackson	New Orleans Saints	LB
2023	5	26	161	Nick Hampton	Los Angeles Rams	LB
2023	7	9	226	Cooper Hodges	Jacksonville Jaguars	T
