= Jason Hunter =

Jason Hunter may refer to:

- Inspectah Deck (Jason Hunter, born 1970), American musician
- Brother J (Jason Hunter), member of the hip hop group X Clan
- Jason Hunter (American football) (born 1983), American football player
