= Evangelical Christian School (Fort Myers, Florida) =

Location
- 8237 Beacon Blvd; Fort Myers, Florida 33907; United States; 26°34′28″N 81°51′40″W

Information
- Motto: Exceptional, Compassionate, Spirited
- Denomination: Non-denominational
- Established: 1973
- Founder: Dr. Douglas D. Dunn
- Principal: Michelle Shuford (grades K4-6); James Stedcke (grades 7-12)
- Headmaster: John M. Hunte
- Teaching staff: 89 (as of 2013-14)
- Grades: PK-12
- Enrollment: 645 (non-prekindergarten) (as of 2013-14)
- Student to teacher ratio: 7.5 (as of 2013-14)
- Colours: Red and White
- Athletics: FHSAA Class A, District 6
- Team name: Sentinels
- Accreditation: Florida Association of Christian Colleges and Schools
- Yearbook: Volume
- Website: http://www.goecs.org/

Evangelical Christian School (ECS) is a private, college preparatory, non-denominational Christian school in Fort Myers, Florida. ECS has about 1,600 students.

== History ==
ECS was founded in May 1973 by Douglas D. and Elsie M. Dunn. In 1975 the school was moved to its present site. Over the years, the enrollment has grown to exceed 1,000 students and several new buildings have been added.

== Notable alumni ==
- Matt Caldwell, former Republican member of the Florida House of Representatives, representing District 79 from 2010 to 2018.
- Corey Lynch, NFL player

== Notable faculty ==
- Earnest Graham was hired in February 2019 as head football coach.
