= 2005 NCAA Division I-AA Football Championship Game =

College football game

2005 NCAA Division I-AA Football Championship
- I-AA National Championship Game
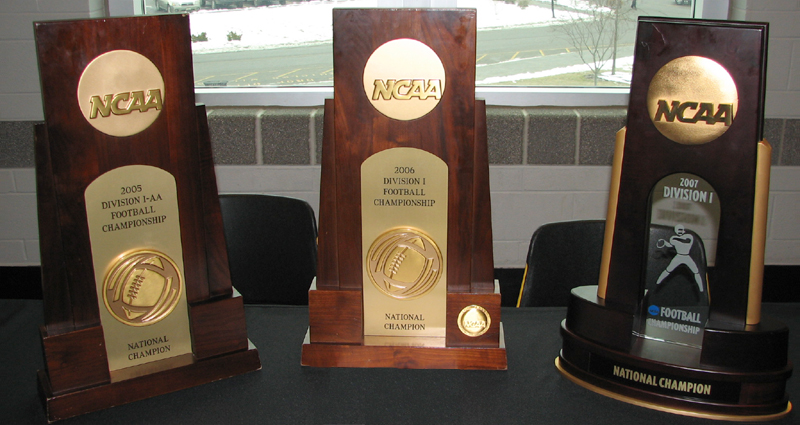
- 2005 I-AA National Championship trophy (left)
Appalachian State Mountaineers	Northern Iowa Panthers
(11–3)	(11–3)
SoCon	Gateway
21	16
Head coach: Jerry Moore	Head coach: Mark Farley
TSN / Seed; 5 / 2	TSN / Seed; 7 / —
	1	2	3	4	Total
Appalachian State	0	7	7	7	21
Northern Iowa	6	10	0	0	16
- Date: December 16, 2005
- Season: 2005
- Stadium: Finley Stadium
- Location: Chattanooga, Tennessee
- Referee: Bruce Palmer (Big Sky)
- Attendance: 20,236

United States TV coverage
- Network: ESPN2
- Announcers: Dave Pasch (play-by-play), Rod Gilmore (color), Trevor Matich (color), Stacey Dales-Schuman (sideline)

The 2005 NCAA Division I-AA Football Championship Game was a postseason college football game between the Northern Iowa Panthers and the Appalachian State Mountaineers. The game was played on December 16, 2005, at Finley Stadium, home field of the University of Tennessee at Chattanooga. This was the final season that the NCAA football classification now known as the Football Championship Subdivision (FCS) operated as Division I-AA. The culminating game of the 2005 NCAA Division I-AA football season, it was won by Appalachian State, 21–16.

== Teams ==
The participants of the Championship Game were the finalists of the 2005 I-AA Playoffs, which began with a 16-team bracket.

=== Appalachian State Mountaineers ===
Appalachian State finished their regular season with an 8–3 record (6–1 in conference). Two of their losses were to Division I-A teams; Kansas and LSU. The Mountaineers were the second-seed in the tournament and defeated Lafayette, Southern Illinois, and Furman to reach the final. This was the first appearance for Appalachian State in a Division I-AA championship game.

=== Northern Iowa Panthers ===
Northern Iowa finished their regular season with an 8–3 record (5–2 in conference). One of their losses was to Iowa of Division I-A. The Panthers were unseeded in the tournament; they defeated Eastern Washington, first-seed New Hampshire, and fourth-seed Texas State to reach the final. This was also the first appearance for Northern Iowa in a Division I-AA championship game.

== Game summary ==
Northern Iowa took a 6–0 lead in the first quarter, from a pair of field goals. In the second quarter, Appalachian State briefly went ahead, 7–6, on a five-yard touchdown run by Kevin Richardson. Northern Iowa then reclaimed the lead on a touchdown of their own, and extended their advantage to 16–7 from another field goal shortly before halftime. In the third quarter, Richardson's second touchdown of the game brought Appalachian State to within two points, 16–14. With just over nine minutes remaining in the fourth quarter, Appalachian State forced a fumble, which was picked up and run in for a touchdown by Jason Hunter. There would be no further scoring, as Appalachian State won their first title via the 21–16 final.

=== Scoring summary ===
Scoring summary

Quarter	Time	Drive			Team	Scoring information	Score	
Quarter	Time	Plays	Yards	TOP	Team	Scoring information	APP	UNI
1	11:36	9	41	3:31	UNI	50-yard field goal by Brian Wingert	0	3
1	9:45	6	15	1:44	UNI	26-yard field goal by Wingert	0	6
2	13:18	9	64	2:41	APP	Kevin Richardson 5-yard touchdown run, Julian Rauch kick good	7	6
2	8:20	5	41	2:13	UNI	David Horne 2-yard touchdown run, Wingert kick good	7	13
2	1:09	7	14	2:57	UNI	31-yard field goal by Wingert	7	16
3	6:05	9	79	4:12	APP	Richardson 1-yard touchdown run, Rauch kick good	14	16
4	9:14				APP	Fumble recovery returned 15 yards for touchdown by Jason Hunter, Rauch kick good	21	16
"TOP" = time of possession. For other American football terms, see Glossary of American football.							21	16

=== Game statistics ===
	1	2	3	4	Total
No. 2 Mountaineers	0	7	7	7	21
Panthers	6	10	0	0	16

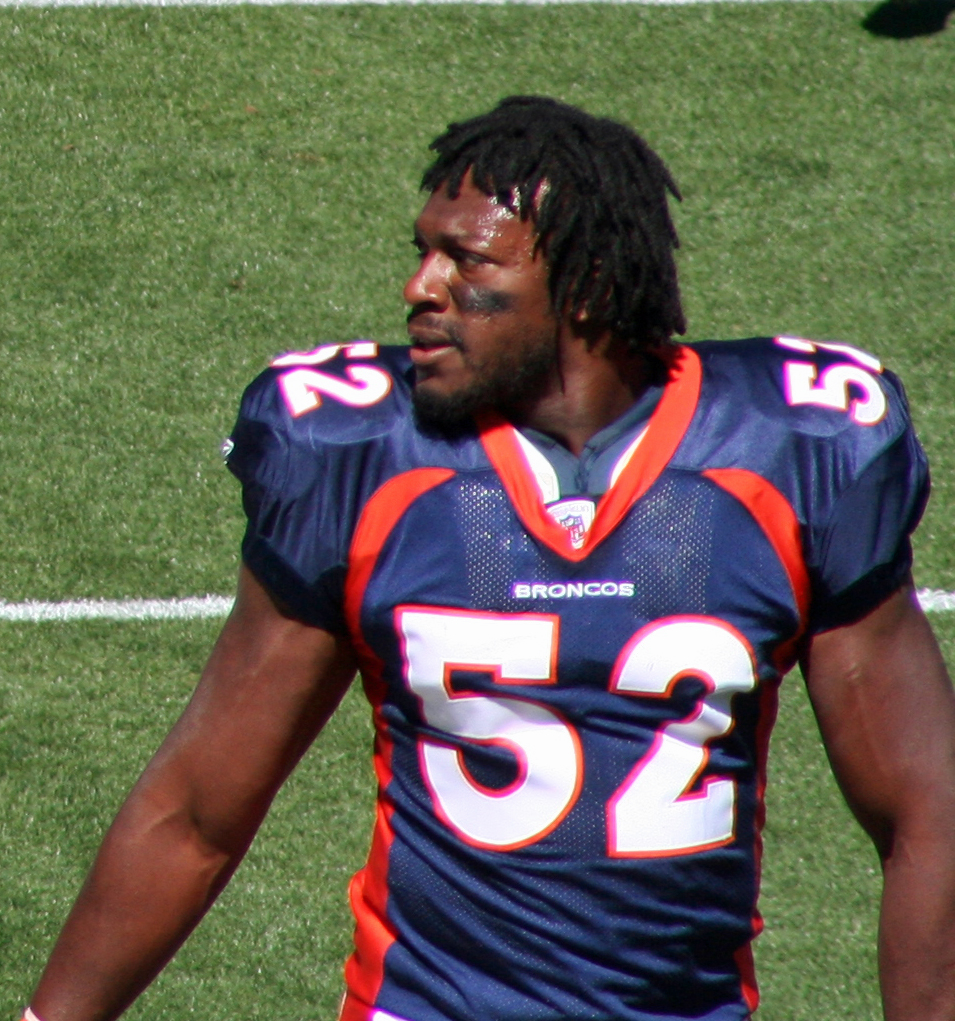
Jason Hunter scored the winning touchdown for Appalachian State.

Statistics	APP	UNI
First downs	18	21
Plays–yards	70–298	78–283
Rushes–yards	28–46	47–102
Passing yards	252	181
Passing: comp–att–int	19–42–1	17–31–0
Time of possession	23:34	36:26

Team	Category	Player	Statistics
Appalachian State	Passing	Richie Williams	10–26, 129 yds
Appalachian State	Rushing	Kevin Richardson	17 car, 51 yds, 2 TD
Appalachian State	Receiving	Zach Johnson	6 rec, 101 yds
Northern Iowa	Passing	Eric Sanders	17–31, 181 yds
Northern Iowa	Rushing	David Horne	22 car, 102 yds, 1 TD
Northern Iowa	Receiving	Justin Surrency	5 rec, 59 yds
