= 1964 Appalachian State Mountaineers football team =

American college football season

1964 Appalachian State Mountaineers football
- Conference: Carolinas Conference
- Record: 6–3 (3–2 Carolinas)
- Head coach: Jim Duncan (5th season)
- Home stadium: Conrad Stadium

1964 Carolinas Conference football standings
	Conf.					Overall
Team	W		L		T	W		L		T
No. 20 Elon $	4	–	1	–	1	8	–	1	–	1
Western Carolina	4	–	2	–	0	5	–	4	–	0
Appalachian State	3	–	2	–	0	6	–	3	–	0
Catawba	3	–	3	–	0	5	–	6	–	0
Lenoir Rhyne	2	–	3	–	1	3	–	6	–	1
Guilford	2	–	3	–	0	4	–	6	–	0
Newberry	1	–	5	–	0	1	–	9	–	0
$ – Conference champion; Rankings from NAIA poll

The 1964 Appalachian State Mountaineers football team was an American football team that represented Appalachian State Teachers College (now known as Appalachian State University) as a member of the Carolinas Conference during the 1964 NAIA football season. In their fifth year under head coach Jim Duncan, the Mountaineers compiled an overall record of 6–3, with a mark of 3–2 in conference play, and finished third in the Carolinas Conference.

== Schedule ==
Date	Opponent	Site	Result	Attendance	Source
September 19	at Newberry	Setzler Field; Newberry, SC	W 20–6		
September 26	at Western Carolina	Memorial Stadium; Cullowhee, NC (rivalry)	W 27–10	3,800	
October 3	Elon	Conrad Stadium; Boone, NC	L 7–28		
October 10	at Lenoir Rhyne	College Field; Hickory, NC	L 7–14		
October 17	Catawba	Conrad Stadium; Boone, NC	W 40–20		
October 24	at Carson–Newman*	Jefferson City, TN	W 10–7	4,500	
October 31	Wofford*	Conrad Stadium; Boone, NC	W 10–0		
November 7	at Presbyterian*	Bailey Stadium; Clinton, SC	L 21–23		
November 14	Emory & Henry*	Conrad Stadium; Boone, NC	W 21–14		
*Non-conference game
