= Corey Lynch =

American football player (born 1985)

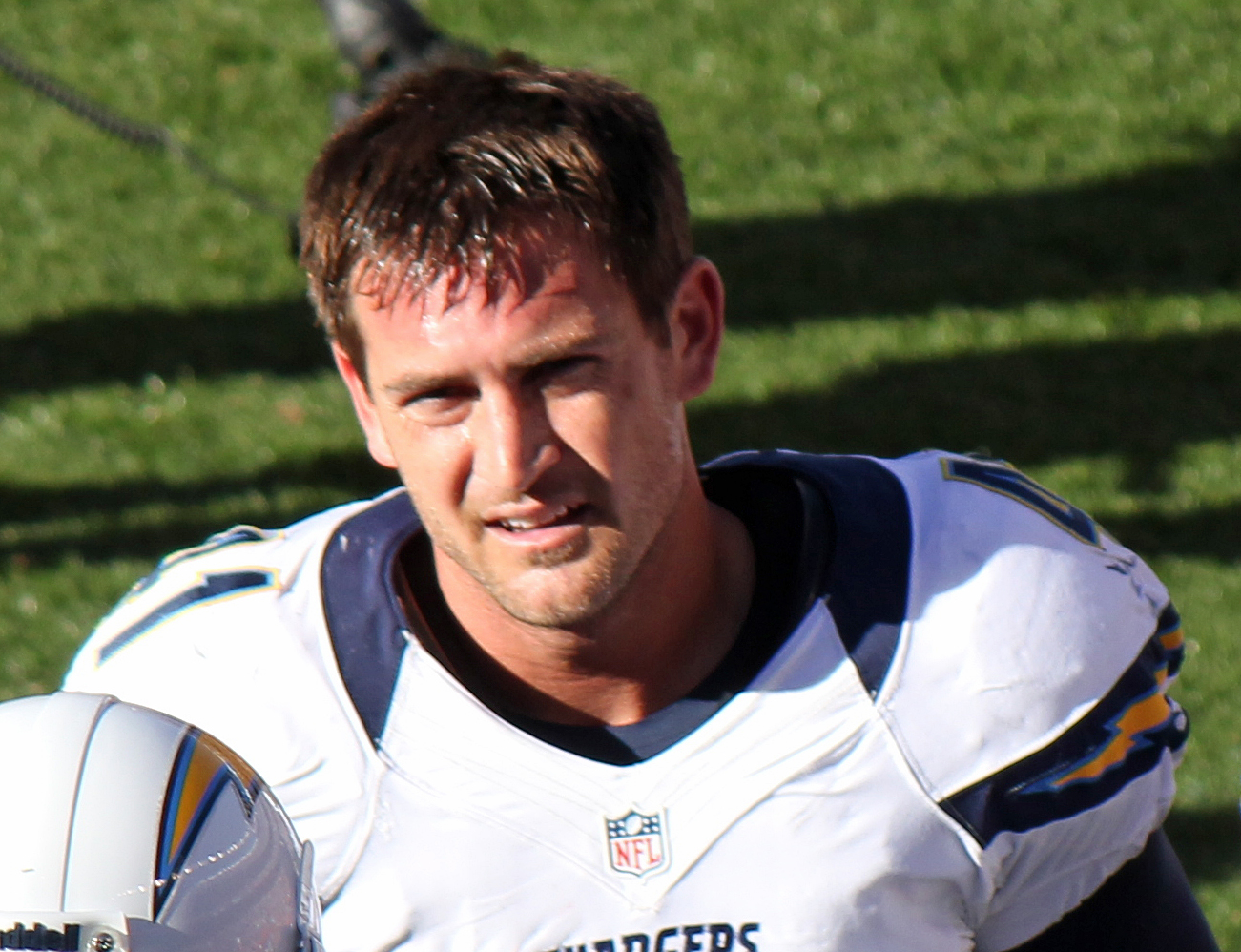
- Lynch with the San Diego Chargers in 2012

No. 47, 41, 42
- Position: Safety

Personal information
- Born: May 7, 1985 (age 41); Cape Coral, Florida, U.S.
- Listed height: 6 ft 0 in (1.83 m)
- Listed weight: 205 lb (93 kg)

Career information
- High school: Evangelical Christian (Fort Myers, Florida)
- College: Appalachian State (2003–2007)
- NFL draft: 2008: 6th round, 177th overall pick

Career history
- Cincinnati Bengals (2008); Tampa Bay Buccaneers (2009−2011); San Diego Chargers (2012); Tennessee Titans (2013); Indianapolis Colts (2013)

Awards and highlights
- 3× NCAA Division I-AA/FCS national champion (2005, 2006, 2007); Southern Conference Defensive Player of the Year (2007)

Career NFL statistics
- Total tackles: 125
- Fumble recoveries: 1
- Interceptions: 5
- Stats at Pro Football Reference

Corey Austin Lynch (born May 7, 1985) is an American former professional football player who was a safety in the National Football League (NFL). He was selected by the Cincinnati Bengals in the sixth round of the 2008 NFL draft. He played college football for the Appalachian State Mountaineers.

== Early life ==
Corey graduated from Evangelical Christian School in Fort Myers, Florida. Lynch's father, Brian was his coach at this school. Brian Lynch remained the football coach at Evangelical until 2012.

== College career ==
Lynch played collegiate ball at Appalachian State University from 2003 to 2007, helping his Mountaineers win 3 back-to-back-to-back national championships in 2005, 2006 and 2007. He is a three-time All-American and is perhaps best known for blocking Jason Gingel's field goal attempt in the waning seconds of Appalachian State's 2007 game against Michigan, in which the FCS No. 1 Mountaineers upset the No. 5 nationally ranked Michigan Wolverines on September 1, 2007.

He currently holds the NCAA FCS record for passes defended at 52 (28 pass deflections, 24 interceptions) and finished his collegiate level play with 358 career tackles.

Lynch earned a B.S. in Physics from Appalachian State in December 2007.

== Professional career ==
=== Cincinnati Bengals ===
The Cincinnati Bengals selected Lynch in the sixth round (177th overall) of the 2008 NFL draft.

On October 12, 2008 against the New York Jets, Lynch recorded his first career interception by picking off quarterback Brett Favre. Lynch was placed on season-ending injured reserve with a knee injury on October 27, 2008. He finished his rookie season with nine tackles, an interception and a pass deflection in seven games.

Lynch was featured in a segment on the HBO show Hard Knocks for saving a woman's life who was in a car accident.

=== Tampa Bay Buccaneers ===
Lynch was signed off the Bengals practice squad on September 23, 2009.

=== San Diego Chargers ===
Lynch signed with the San Diego Chargers for the 2012 season.

=== Tennessee Titans ===
On August 11, 2013, Lynch was signed by the Tennessee Titans. He was cut on August 31. Lynch was re-signed by the Titans on October 28, 2013. On November 22, 2013, just 25 days after being re-signed with the team, Corey was again waived by the Tennessee Titans.

=== Indianapolis Colts ===
On November 26, 2013, Lynch was signed by the Indianapolis Colts. Indianapolis opted to acquire the veteran Lynch after Colts' reserve standout safety, Delano Howell, suffered a season-ending injury. Lynch finished his season with the Colts with 4 tackles. On a fake punt, Lynch rushed for 3 yards against the Houston Texans. On June 20, 2014, he was released by the Colts.

== Personal ==
Corey Lynch is married to Jane "Cissie" Graham Lynch, daughter of evangelist Franklin Graham and a grandchild of evangelist Billy Graham and 2007 Queen of the Shenandoah Apple Blossom Festival. He told reporters he thinks the Bengals, which has seen many players in legal trouble off the field, drafted him because of his character as well as for his playing skills. Corey is also an avid fisherman and enjoys much of his spare time fishing in his home town in Florida.

On June 21, 2009, while driving on a Kentucky interstate, Lynch saw a car go off the road and down an embankment. He stopped, ran down to the car, and freed an injured woman's neck. It was written that he saved her life.

Corey is known on the Buccaneers by the nickname "HBO", a reference to his appearance on HBO's Hard Knocks television series.

Corey resides in Boone, NC with his wife, Cissie and children Margaret, Austin and Georgia.

Corey's brother, Colton, was a defensive back on the Harvard Crimson football team having graduated in 2014.
