= 1962 Appalachian State Mountaineers football team =

American college football season

1962 Appalachian State Mountaineers football
- Conference: Carolinas Conference
- Record: 4–4–2 (2–1–2 Carolinas)
- Head coach: Jim Duncan (3rd season)
- Home stadium: Conrad Stadium

1962 Carolinas Conference football standings
	Conf.					Overall
Team	W		L		T	W		L		T
No. 3 Lenoir Rhyne $^	6	–	0	–	0	11	–	1	–	0
Elon	4	–	2	–	0	7	–	3	–	0
Appalachian State	2	–	1	–	2	4	–	4	–	2
Newberry	3	–	2	–	0	6	–	5	–	0
Western Carolina	1	–	4	–	1	3	–	5	–	1
Catawba	1	–	4	–	1	3	–	6	–	1
Guilford	1	–	5	–	0	2	–	7	–	0
$ – Conference champion; ^ – NAIA playoff participant; Rankings from NAIA poll

The 1962 Appalachian State Mountaineers football team was an American football team that represented Appalachian State Teachers College (now known as Appalachian State University) as a member of the Carolinas Conference during the 1962 NAIA football season. In their third year under head coach Jim Duncan, the Mountaineers compiled an overall record of 4–4–2, with a mark of 2–1–2 in conference play, and finished third in the Carolinas Conference.

== Schedule ==
Date	Opponent	Site	Result	Attendance	Source
September 15	Emory & Henry*	Conrad Stadium; Boone, NC	L 3–6	5,000	
September 22	vs. Western Carolina	Memorial Stadium; Asheville, NC (rivalry)	T 6–6	6,000	
September 29	Elon	Conrad Stadium; Boone, NC	W 27–12	7,000	
October 6	at Lenoir Rhyne	College Field; Hickory, NC	L 0–6	9,000	
October 13	Catawba	Conrad Stadium; Boone, NC	T 21–21	8,000	
October 20	at Carson–Newman*	Jefferson City, TN	L 0–3	3,500	
October 27	at East Carolina*	College Stadium; Greenville, NC	L 16–29	5,000	
November 3	Guilford	Conrad Stadium; Boone, NC	W 28–6	3,500	
November 10	vs. Presbyterian	American Legion Memorial Stadium; Charlotte, NC	W 21–0	2,500	
November 24	at Tampa*	Phillips Field; Tampa, FL	W 9–7	6,000–6,500	
*Non-conference game
