= 1963 Appalachian State Mountaineers football team =

American college football season

1963 Appalachian State Mountaineers football
- Conference: Carolinas Conference
- Record: 6–3 (4–1 Carolinas)
- Head coach: Jim Duncan (4th season)
- Home stadium: Conrad Stadium

1963 Carolinas Conference football standings
| | Conf. | | | | | Overall |
| Team | W | | L | | T | W | | L | | T |
|---|---|---|---|---|---|---|---|---|---|---|
| Catawba + | 5 | – | 1 | – | 0 | 6 | – | 3 | – | 0 |
| Elon + | 5 | – | 1 | – | 0 | 6 | – | 4 | – | 0 |
| Appalachian State | 4 | – | 1 | – | 0 | 6 | – | 3 | – | 0 |
| Newberry | 3 | – | 3 | – | 0 | 5 | – | 5 | – | 0 |
| Lenoir Rhyne | 2 | – | 4 | – | 0 | 4 | – | 6 | – | 0 |
| Western Carolina | 1 | – | 5 | – | 0 | 2 | – | 6 | – | 1 |
| Guilford | 0 | – | 5 | – | 0 | 0 | – | 10 | – | 0 |
$ – Conference champion

The 1963 Appalachian State Mountaineers football team was an American football team that represented Appalachian State Teachers College (now known as Appalachian State University) as a member of the Carolinas Conference during the 1963 NAIA football season. In their fourth year under head coach Jim Duncan, the Mountaineers compiled an overall record of 6–3, with a mark of 4–1 in conference play, and finished third in the Carolinas Conference.

The Mountaineers game against East Tennessee State scheduled for November 23 at University Stadium was canceled in deference to the assassination of John F. Kennedy which occurred the previous day at Dallas.

== Schedule ==
| Date | Opponent | Site | Result | Source |
|---|---|---|---|---|
| September 14 | at Wofford* | Snyder Field; Spartanburg, SC | L 14–21 | |
| September 21 | Newberry | Conrad Stadium; Boone, NC | W 14–0 | |
| September 28 | Western Carolina | Conrad Stadium; Boone, NC (rivalry) | W 14–3 | |
| October 5 | at Elon | Burlington Municipal Stadium; Burlington, NC | L 13–16 | |
| October 12 | Lenoir Rhyne | Conrad Stadium; Boone, NC | W 20–6 | |
| October 19 | at Catawba | Shuford Stadium; Salisbury, NC | W 36–33 | |
| October 26 | Carson–Newman* | Conrad Stadium; Boone, NC | W 24–0 | |
| November 2 | at Northwestern State* | Demon Field; Natchitoches, LA | L 20–33 | |
| November 16 | at Emory & Henry* | Fullerton Field; Emory, VA | W 21–18 | |
| November 23 | at East Tennessee State* | University Stadium; Johnson City, TN | Canceled | |
*Non-conference game
