= 1966 Appalachian State Mountaineers football team =

American college football season

1966 Appalachian State Mountaineers football
- Conference: Carolinas Conference
- Record: 3–6–1 (2–5 Carolinas)
- Head coach: Carl Messere (2nd season)
- Home stadium: Conrad Stadium

1966 Carolinas Conference football standings
	Conf.					Overall
Team	W		L		T	W		L		T
Lenoir Rhyne +	5	–	2	–	0	6	–	3	–	0
Presbyterian +	5	–	2	–	0	6	–	4	–	0
Guilford	4	–	2	–	1	5	–	4	–	1
Catawba	4	–	3	–	0	5	–	5	–	0
Newberry	3	–	3	–	1	4	–	5	–	1
Western Carolina	3	–	4	–	0	5	–	5	–	0
Appalachian State	2	–	5	–	0	3	–	6	–	1
Elon	1	–	6	–	0	1	–	9	–	0
+ – Conference co-champions

The 1966 Appalachian State Mountaineers football team was an American football team that represented Appalachian State Teachers College (now known as Appalachian State University) as a member of the Carolinas Conference during the 1966 NAIA football season. In their second year under head coach Carl Messere, the Mountaineers compiled an overall record of 3–6–1, with a mark of 2–5 in conference play, and finished seventh in the Carolinas Conference.

== Schedule ==
Date	Opponent	Site	Result	Attendance	Source
September 17	at Newberry	Setzler Field; Newberry, SC	L 14–15	2,000	
September 24	at Western Carolina	Memorial Stadium; Cullowhee, NC (rivalry)	W 35–33	6,200	
October 1	Elon	Conrad Stadium; Boone, NC	W 8–2	3,000	
October 8	at Lenoir Rhyne	College Field; Hickory, NC	L 7–28	10,500	
October 15	Catawba	Conrad Stadium; Boone, NC	L 17–18	7,000	
October 22	at Carson–Newman*	Burke–Tarr Stadium; Jefferson City, TN	T 14–14	4,000	
October 29	Wofford*	Conrad Stadium; Boone, NC	W 14–12	3,000	
November 5	at Presbyterian	Bailey Stadium; Clinton, SC	L 17–21	2,000	
November 12	Emory & Henry*	Conrad Stadium; Boone, NC	L 6–21	4,000	
November 24	at Guilford	Greensboro, NC	L 13–16	2,500	
*Non-conference game
