= Joey Aguilar =

American football player (born 2001)

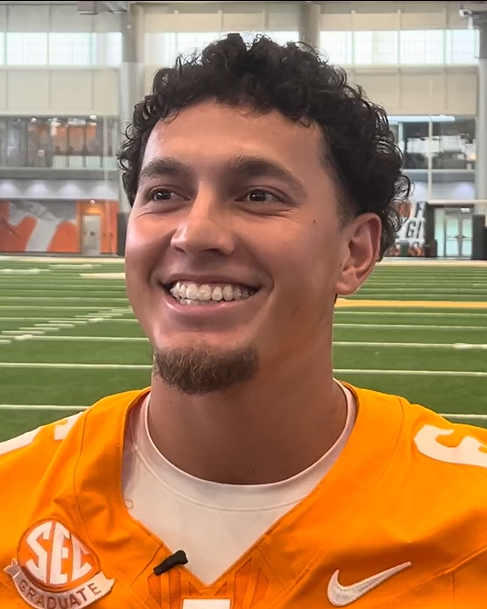
- Aguilar with the Tennessee Volunteers in 2025

No. 18 – Arizona Cardinals
- Position: Quarterback
- Roster status: Active

Personal information
- Born: June 16, 2001 (age 25); Antioch, California, U.S.
- Listed height: 6 ft 3 in (1.91 m)
- Listed weight: 229 lb (104 kg)

Career information
- High school: Freedom (Oakley, California)
- College: City College of San Francisco (2019–2020); Diablo Valley (2021–2022); Appalachian State (2023–2024); Tennessee (2025)
- NFL draft: 2026: undrafted

Career history
- Jacksonville Jaguars (2026)*; Arizona Cardinals (2026–present)
- * Offseason or practice squad member only

Awards and highlights
- Sun Belt Newcomer of the Year (2023); Second-team All-Sun Belt (2023)
- Stats at Pro Football Reference

Jose "Joey" Aguilar (born June 16, 2001) is an American professional football quarterback for the Arizona Cardinals of the National Football League (NFL). He played college football for the Appalachian State Mountaineers, Diablo Valley Vikings, and Tennessee Volunteers.

== Early life ==
Aguilar attended Freedom High School, where he completed 336 of 552 pass attempts for 5,575 yards and 59 touchdowns to 14 interceptions. He also rushed for 151 yards and four touchdowns. Aguilar enrolled to play college football at City College of San Francisco.

== College career ==
=== City College of San Francisco (2019–2020) ===
With no offers coming out of high school, Aguilar enrolled at the City College of San Francisco and redshirted as a true freshman in 2019.

Aguilar did not get the opportunity to play in 2020, as the season was cancelled due to the COVID-19 pandemic. He considered ending his football career and pursuing a career as a firefighter after taking firefighting courses at CCSF. Later, Aguilar decided to transfer to Diablo Valley College and continue playing college football.

=== Diablo Valley (2021–2022) ===
Going into 2021, Dylan Graham was named the starting quarterback for the team. Aguilar competed with him in the first five games of the season, eventually beating out Graham for the starting role. Aguilar made his first start for the team in week 6 against Laney, leading the team to win by the score of 54–29. He remained the starter for the rest of the season, finishing with a record of 3–2.

In 2022, Graham had transferred out of Diablo Valley to the University of Texas Permian Basin, leaving Aguilar with the starting job. Aguilar played in the first two games of the season, however an injury sidelined him for a month. After missing three games, Aguilar returned to play in October against Chabot, winning with a score of 33–17. At Diablo Valley, Aguilar completed 228 of 379 passing attempts for 2,992 yards and 21 touchdowns with ten interceptions and rushed for 619 yards and two touchdowns, while also hauling in one reception.

=== Appalachian State (2023–2024) ===
For his junior year, Aguilar committed to playing Division I college football at Appalachian State University. He was named backup quarterback behind Ryan Burger. However, in week one, after Burger went down with an injury, Aguilar came in for relief, where he completed 11 of his 13 passes for 174 yards and four touchdowns in a win over Gardner-Webb. He was named the starting quarterback for their week 2 matchup versus North Carolina. In his first start against North Carolina, Aguilar went 22 for 43 passing for 275 yards and two touchdowns with an interception in a loss. In week 3, Aguilar completed 17 of 29 passing attempts for 241 yards and three touchdowns with an interception, while also adding a touchdown on the ground in a win over East Carolina. In week 5, Aguilar went 27 for 39 for 335 yards and three touchdowns, with two interceptions, as he helped the Mountaineers beat Louisiana-Monroe 41–40.

Aguilar holds multiple single season passing records and ranks among the program's top 10 in several career passing categories, despite playing only two seasons. In 2023, he set school records with 3,757 passing yards and 33 touchdowns. His 2024 totals rank sixth all-time in passing yards and tied for ninth in passing touchdowns. Aguilar passed for 424 yards in a 2024 game against East Carolina University, marking the third-highest single-game total in program history. He graduated from Appalachian State University with a degree in Communication Studies in 2025 before arriving at Tennessee.

=== Tennessee (2025) ===
On December 28, 2024, Aguilar decided to transfer to UCLA for his final year of eligibility. Following Nico Iamaleava's transfer to UCLA, Aguilar decided to transfer to Tennessee. Upon Aguilar's arrival, Tennessee head coach Josh Heupel stated that there would be open competition at the quarterback position between Aguilar, Jake Merklinger, and George MacIntyre. On August 17, 2025, Aguilar was named the starter going into the week 1 game against Syracuse. In his debut for Tennessee, Aguilar threw for 247 yards and 3 touchdowns, beating Syracuse with a score of 45–26.

=== Statistics ===
Season	Team	Games			Passing								Rushing			
Season	Team	GP	GS	Record	Cmp	Att	Pct	Yds	Y/A	TD	Int	Rtg	Att	Yds	Avg	TD
2019	CCSF	(redshirt) Redshirted														
2020	CCSF	Season cancelled due to the COVID-19 pandemic														
2021	Diablo Valley	10	5	3–2	102	182	56.0	1,546	8.5	13	6	144.4	52	261	5.0	2
2022	Diablo Valley	6	6	4–2	126	197	64.0	1,446	7.3	8	4	135.0	65	358	5.5	0
2023	Appalachian State	14	13	8–5	293	460	63.7	3,757	8.2	33	10	151.6	81	245	3.0	3
2024	Appalachian State	11	11	5–6	218	390	55.8	3,003	7.7	23	14	132.5	59	207	3.5	2
2025	Tennessee	13	13	8–5	272	404	67.3	3,565	8.8	24	10	156.1	71	101	1.4	4
CCCAA career		16	11	7–4	228	379	60.2	2,992	7.9	21	10	139.5	117	619	5.27	2
NCAA career		37	36	21–15	783	1,254	62.4	10,325	8.2	80	34	147.2	211	557	2.6	9

== Professional career ==
Pre-draft measurables
Height	Weight	Arm length	Hand span	Wingspan
6 ft 3 1/4 in (1.91 m)	229 lb (104 kg)	31 3/4 in (0.81 m)	9 5/8 in (0.24 m)	6 ft 5 1/8 in (1.96 m)
All values from NFL Combine

=== Jacksonville Jaguars ===
On April 26, 2026, Aguilar signed with the Jacksonville Jaguars as an undrafted free agent. Aguilar was released by Jacksonville during final roster cuts on August 30; he was re-signed to the team's practice squad the following day.

=== Arizona Cardinals ===
On November 10, 2026, Aguilar was signed by the Arizona Cardinals off of the Jaguars practice squad.

== Personal life ==
Aguilar is the son of Jose and Lydia Aguilar. Aguilar is a Christian.
