= 1965 Appalachian State Mountaineers football team =

American college football season

1965 Appalachian State Mountaineers football
- Conference: Carolinas Conference
- Record: 5–5 (3–3 Carolinas)
- Head coach: Carl Messere (1st season)
- Home stadium: Conrad Stadium

1965 Carolinas Conference football standings
	Conf.					Overall
Team	W		L		T	W		L		T
Lenoir Rhyne $	6	–	0	–	0	7	–	3	–	0
Guilford	3	–	1	–	0	8	–	2	–	0
Western Carolina	5	–	2	–	0	7	–	2	–	0
Catawba	3	–	3	–	0	7	–	3	–	0
Appalachian State	3	–	3	–	0	5	–	5	–	0
Newberry	3	–	4	–	0	3	–	7	–	0
Presbyterian	1	–	4	–	0	5	–	5	–	0
Elon	0	–	7	–	0	2	–	8	–	0
$ – Conference champion

The 1965 Appalachian State Mountaineers football team was an American football team that represented Appalachian State Teachers College (now known as Appalachian State University) as a member of the Carolinas Conference during the 1965 NAIA football season. In their first year under head coach Carl Messere, the Mountaineers compiled an overall record of 5–5, with a mark of 3–3 in conference play, and finished tied for fourth in the Carolinas Conference.

== Schedule ==
Date	Opponent	Site	Result	Attendance	Source
September 18	Newberry	Conrad Stadium; Boone, NC	W 10–7		
September 25	Western Carolina	Conrad Stadium; Boone, NC (rivalry)	L 0–7	5,000	
October 2	at Elon	Burlington Municipal Stadium; Burlington, NC	W 9–0		
October 9	Lenoir Rhyne	Conrad Stadium; Boone, NC	L 6–23		
October 16	at Catawba	Shuford Stadium; Salisbury, NC	L 7–32	2,500	
October 23	Carson–Newman*	Conrad Stadium; Boone, NC	W 17–7	7,000	
October 30	at Wofford*	Snyder Field; Spartanburg, SC	L 14–22		
November 6	Presbyterian	Conrad Stadium; Boone, NC	W 26–10		
November 13	at Emory & Henry*	Fullerton Field; Emory, VA	W 28–10		
November 25	at Southeastern Louisiana*	Strawberry Stadium; Hammond, LA	L 6–54		
*Non-conference game
