= 1967 Appalachian State Mountaineers football team =

American college football season

1967 Appalachian State Mountaineers football
- Conference: Carolinas Conference
- Record: 7–3 (5–2 Carolinas)
- Head coach: Carl Messere (3rd season)
- Home stadium: Conrad Stadium

1967 Carolinas Conference football standings
	Conf.					Overall
Team	W		L		T	W		L		T
No. 9 Lenoir Rhyne $	6	–	1	–	0	8	–	1	–	0
Appalachian State	5	–	2	–	0	7	–	3	–	0
Elon	4	–	2	–	1	5	–	3	–	1
Presbyterian	4	–	3	–	0	5	–	4	–	1
Guilford	3	–	4	–	0	6	–	4	–	0
Catawba	2	–	4	–	1	5	–	4	–	1
Western Carolina	2	–	4	–	1	4	–	5	–	1
Newberry	0	–	6	–	1	1	–	8	–	1
$ – Conference champion; Rankings from NAIA poll

The 1967 Appalachian State Mountaineers football team was an American football team that represented Appalachian State University as a member of the Carolinas Conference during the 1967 NAIA football season. In their third year under head coach Carl Messere, the Mountaineers compiled an overall record of 7–3, with a mark of 5–2 in conference play, and finished second in the Carolinas Conference.

== Schedule ==
Date	Opponent	Site	Result	Attendance	Source
September 16	Newberry	Conrad Stadium; Boone, NC	W 21–12	5,000	
September 23	Western Carolina	Conrad Stadium; Boone, NC (rivalry)	L 0–21	5,393	
September 30	at Elon	Burlington Municipal Stadium; Burlington, NC	W 34–13	3,500	
October 7	Lenoir Rhyne	Conrad Stadium; Boone, NC	L 6–56	5,514	
October 14	at Catawba	Shuford Stadium; Salisbury, NC	W 19–7	3,000	
October 21	Carson–Newman*	Conrad Stadium; Boone, NC	W 18–14	6,000	
October 28	at Wofford*	Snyder Field; Spartanburg, SC	L 24–27		
November 4	Presbyterian	Conrad Stadium; Boone, NC	W 57–18		
November 11	at Emory & Henry*	Fullerton Field; Emory, VA	W 26–25	5,000	
November 23	at Guilford	Greensboro, NC	W 21–19		
*Non-conference game
