= De'Andre Presley =

American football player (born 1990)

DeAndre Presley
No. 21, 10
- Position: Wide receiver

Personal information
- Born: January 10, 1990 (age 36); Tampa, Florida, U.S.
- Listed height: 5 ft 11 in (1.80 m)
- Listed weight: 180 lb (82 kg)

Career information
- High school: Middleton (Tampa)
- College: Appalachian State (2008–2011)
- NFL draft: 2012: undrafted

Career history
- San Diego Chargers (2012)*; Miami Dolphins (2012–2013); Carolina Panthers (2013–2014)
- * Offseason or practice squad member only

Awards and highlights
- Southern Conference Offensive Player of the Year (2010); First-team All-Southern Conference (2010)

Career NFL statistics
- Total tackles: 2
- Stats at Pro Football Reference

De'Andre Reshaud Presley (born January 10, 1990) is an American former professional football player who was a wide receiver in the National Football League (NFL). He played college football for the Appalachian State Mountaineers.

== College career ==
In 2010, he replaced Armanti Edwards at quarterback for the Mountaineers and led the team to a 10–3 record before losing to the Villanova Wildcats in the quarterfinals of the 2010 FCS playoffs. On December 1, he was named as one of three finalists for the 2010 Walter Payton Award.

In the first game of the 2011 season, Appalachian State squared up against the Virginia Tech Hokies and were blown out 66–13. Afterwards, Presley told USA Today, "Not taking anything away from them, but I wouldn't classify them as an elite team." Presley threw 7 for 18 (a 39% completion rate) for 89 yards with two interceptions and one fumble in the game.

== Professional career ==
=== San Diego Chargers ===
On April 29, 2012, he was signed as a cornerback by the San Diego Chargers as an undrafted free agent.

=== Miami Dolphins ===
He was promoted from the practice squad to the active roster.

=== Carolina Panthers ===
On September 18, 2013, he was signed to the Panthers' practice squad. After the Panthers released Jason Avant on November 18, 2014, Presley was promoted to the active roster. Presley was released on September 1, 2015.

== Legal troubles ==
On January 31, 2018, an arrest warrant was issued for Presley, subsequently he turned himself in. He is accused of having sex (sexual battery) with a student 16 or 17 years of age according to the Spartanburg County Sheriff’s Office. He has since resigned from his position with the school.
