= Carl Messere =

American football player and coach

Carl John Messere
Biographical details
- Born: 8 May 1936
- Died: 2 Sep. 2023; Cary, North Carolina, United States

Playing career
- 1957–1960: Appalachian State
- Position: Center

Coaching career (HC unless noted)
- 1961: Appalachian State (GA)
- 1962–1964: Appalachian State (line)
- 1965–1970: Appalachian State

Head coaching record
- Overall: 34–26–1

Carl John Messere was an American former college football player and coach. He was the 14th head football coach at Appalachian State University, serving from 1965 to 1970.

== Head coaching record ==
Year	Team	Overall	Conference	Standing	Bowl/playoffs
Appalachian State Mountaineers (Carolinas Conference) (1965–1967)
1965	Appalachian State	5–5	3–3	T–4th	
1966	Appalachian State	3–6–1	2–5	7th	
1967	Appalachian State	7–3	5–2	2nd	
Appalachian State Mountaineers (NAIA / NAIA Division I independent) (1968–1970)
1968	Appalachian State	8–2			
1969	Appalachian State	6–5			
1970	Appalachian State	5–5			
Appalachian State:		34–26–1	10–10		
Total:		34–26–1			
