= 1969 Appalachian State Mountaineers football team =

American college football season

1969 Appalachian State Mountaineers football
- Conference: Independent
- Record: 6–5
- Head coach: Carl Messere (5th season)
- Home stadium: Conrad Stadium

1969 NAIA independents football records
	Conf.			Overall
Team	W	L	T	W		L		T
No. 14/NR Boise State		–		9	–	1	–	0
No. 8/NR Western Carolina		–		9	–	1	–	0
Cal Lutheran		–		8	–	1	–	0
No. 2/6 New Mexico Highlands ^		–		8	–	1	–	1
No. 5/NR Hillsdale ^		–		9	–	2	–	0
Wofford		–		9	–	2	–	0
No. 15/9 Tampa		–		8	–	2	–	0
Austin		–		7	–	2	–	0
Westminster (PA)		–		6	–	2	–	0
Georgetown (KY)		–		6	–	3	–	0
Carson–Newman		–		6	–	3	–	1
Iowa Wesleyan		–		5	–	3	–	0
La Verne		–		5	–	4	–	0
Waynesburg		–		5	–	4	–	0
Appalachian State		–		6	–	5	–	0
Oklahoma Panhandle State		–		6	–	5	–	0
Grove City		–		3	–	4	–	1
Southwest State (MN)		–		3	–	6	–	0
Emory and Henry		–		2	–	7	–	0
Missouri Southern		–		2	–	8	–	0
Geneva		–		1	–	6	–	1
Simon Fraser		–		1	–	6	–	1
Azusa Pacific		–		1	–	7	–	0
Eastern New Mexico *		–		1	–	9	–	0
Kentucky State		–		0	–	8	–	0
^ – NAIA playoff participant; * Eastern New Mexico forfeits win over Adams State and Central State (OK).; Rankings from NAIA poll and AP small college poll

The 1969 Appalachian State Mountaineers football team was an American football team that represented Appalachian State University as an independent during the 1969 NAIA football season. In their fifth year under head coach Carl Messere, the Mountaineers compiled an overall record of 6–5.

== Schedule ==
Date	Opponent	Site	Result	Attendance	Source
September 13	at East Tennessee State	University Field; Johnson City, TN	L 16–18		
September 20	at Emory & Henry	Fullerton Field; Emory, VA	W 41–0		
September 27	Western Carolina	Conrad Stadium; Boone, NC (rivalry)	L 7–35		
October 4	at Elon	Burlington Municipal Stadium; Burlington, NC	W 27–20		
October 11	Lenoir Rhyne	Conrad Stadium; Boone, NC	L 17–24		
October 18	at Catawba	Shuford Stadium; Salisbury, NC	W 42–27	3,500	
October 25	Carson–Newman^{†}	Conrad Stadium; Boone, NC	W 24–15	7,500	
November 1	at Wofford	Snyder Field; Spartanburg, SC	L 21–35		
November 8	Presbyterian	Conrad Stadium; Boone, NC	L 25–27		
November 15	at Samford	Seibert Stadium; Homewood, AL	W 49–36		
November 22	Guilford	Conrad Stadium; Boone, NC	W 24–13	3,000	
^{†}Homecoming
