= Harold Alexander (American football) =

American football player (born 1970)

No. 5
- Position: Punter

Personal information
- Born: October 20, 1970 (age 56); Pickens, South Carolina, U.S.
- Listed height: 6 ft 2 in (1.88 m)
- Listed weight: 224 lb (102 kg)

Career information
- High school: Pickens
- College: Appalachian State
- NFL draft: 1993: 3rd round, 67th overall pick

Career history
- Atlanta Falcons (1993–1994); Detroit Lions (1995)*
- * Offseason or practice squad member only

Career NFL statistics
- Punts: 143
- Punting yards: 5,950
- Punting avg: 41.6
- Stats at Pro Football Reference

Harold Donald Alexander (born October 20, 1970) is an American former professional football player who was a punter in the National Football League (NFL). Alexander was selected with the 67th overall pick in the third round by the Atlanta Falcons out of Appalachian State University in the 1993 NFL draft. At the time of his selection, he was the second-highest drafted player out of Appalachian State.
