= Jim Duncan (defensive end) =

American gridiron football player and coach (1924–2011)

No. 86
- Position: Defensive end

Personal information
- Born: May 2, 1925; Reidsville, North Carolina, U.S.
- Died: January 5, 2011 (aged 85); Sunset Beach, North Carolina, U.S.
- Listed height: 6 ft 2 in (1.88 m)
- Listed weight: 205 lb (93 kg)

Career information
- College: Duke; Wake Forest
- NFL draft: 1950: 9th round, 117th overall pick

Career history

Playing
- New York Giants (1950–1953)

Coaching
- Appalachian State (1959) Assistant; Appalachian St. (1960-1964) Head coach; Saskatchewan Roughriders (1965–1968) Assistant; Calgary Stampeders (1969–1973) Head coach

Awards and highlights
- Grey Cup champion (1971); Second-team All-SoCon (1948)

Career NFL statistics
- Fumble recoveries: 4
- Interceptions: 7
- Stats at Pro Football Reference

Head coaching record
- Regular season: College: 31–15–2 (.667); CFL: 39–40–1 (.494)

James Hampton Duncan (May 2, 1924 – January 5, 2011) was an American professional football player and coach.

== Early life and college career ==
Duncan played high school football at Reidsville High School in Reidsville, North Carolina.

He served in the U.S. Navy during World War II, spending 15 months in Okinawa. Duncan played his first collegiate football season for the Duke Blue Devils under Wallace Wade in 1946. Duncan then spent three seasons as a standout defensive lineman for Peahead Walker's Wake Forest Demon Deacons. He was an All-Southern Conference player all three years at Wake Forest and was the team MVP in 1949.

== Professional career ==
Duncan was a linebacker and defensive end for the New York Giants of the National Football League (NFL) from 1950 to 1955. He was drafted by the Chicago Bears in both the 1948 and 1949 NFL drafts while also being drafted 117th overall by the Cleveland Browns in the ninth round of the 1950 NFL draft. He was named Giants co-captain, along with Kyle Rote in 1954.

== Coaching career ==
Duncan was the 13th head football coach at Appalachian State Teachers College—now known as Appalachian State University—located in the town of Boone, North Carolina, serving from 1960 to 1964. He had a 31–15–2 as the Mountaineers head coach. On December 4, 1964, Duncan resigned as head football coach at Appalachian State.

In 1965, Duncan joined the Saskatchewan Roughriders of the Canadian Football League (CFL) as an assistant under head coach Eagle Keys. He was with the team when they defeated the Ottawa Rough Riders in the 54th Grey Cup and when the team lost to the Hamilton Tiger-Cats in the 55th Grey Cup.

Duncan became head coach of the Calgary Stampeders in 1969, replacing Jerry Williams who left the team to join the Philadelphia Eagles. Duncan's stint with the Stamps resulted in two Grey Cup appearances; one win (59th) and one loss (58th). Duncan was fired in 1973 after back to back 6–10 seasons. His overall record with Calgary was 39–40–1.

Duncan was later hired by a group from London, Ontario, who hoped to bring professional football to their city, and later served as executive assistant of the Portland Storm of the World Football League (WFL).

== Personal life ==
He was inducted into the Wake Forest Sports Hall of Fame in 1985 and the North Carolina Sports Hall of Fame in 1993.

Duncan died from complications of Alzheimer's disease in 2011 at the age of 86.

== Head coaching record ==
=== College ===
Year	Team	Overall	Conference	Standing	Bowl/playoffs
Appalachian State Mountaineers (North State Conference / Carolinas Conference) (1960–1964)
1960	Appalachian State	8–2	5–1	2nd	
1961	Appalachian State	7–3	5–1	2nd	
1962	Appalachian State	4–4–2	2–1–2	3rd	
1963	Appalachian State	6–3	4–1	3rd	
1964	Appalachian State	6–3	3–2	3rd	
Appalachian State:		31–15–2	20–6–2		
Total:		31–15–2			

=== CFL ===
Team	Year	Regular season					Postseason		
Team	Year	Won	Lost	Ties	Win %	Finish	Won	Lost	Result
CGY	1969	9	7	0	.563	2nd in West Division	1	1	Lost West Final (SSK)
CGY	1970	9	7	0	.563	3rd in West Division	2	1	Lost 58th Grey Cup (MTL)
CGY	1971	9	6	1	.662	1st in West Division	2	0	Won 59th Grey Cup (TOR)
CGY	1972	6	10	0	.375	4th in West Division	-	-	Failed to Qualify
CGY	1973	6	10	0	.375	4th in West Division	-	-	Failed to Qualify
Total		39	40	1	.495	1 Division; Championship	5	2	1 Grey Cup
