= 1970 Appalachian State Mountaineers football team =

American college football season

1970 Appalachian State Mountaineers football
- Conference: Independent
- Record: 5–5
- Head coach: Carl Messere (6th season)
- Home stadium: Conrad Stadium

1970 NAIA Division I independents football records
	Conf.			Overall
Team	W	L	T	W		L		T
No. 4/6 Wofford ^		–		11	–	1	–	0
No. 18/NR Hillsdale		–		9	–	2	–	0
No. 5/NR New Mexico Highlands ^		–		9	–	2	–	0
No. 19/19 Eastern Michigan		–		7	–	2	–	1
La Verne		–		5	–	4	–	0
Appalachian State		–		6	–	5	–	0
Carson–Newman		–		4	–	6	–	0
Kentucky State		–		3	–	6	–	0
Eastern New Mexico		–		2	–	8	–	0
$ – Conference champion; ^ – NAIA Division I playoff participant; Rankings from NAIA Division I poll and AP small college poll

The 1970 Appalachian State Mountaineers football team was an American football team that represented Appalachian State University as an independent during the 1970 NAIA Division I football season. In their sixth year under head coach Carl Messere, the Mountaineers compiled an overall record of 5–5. This was the final year that Appalachian State played in the NAIA, as they transitioned to the NCAA at the conclusion of the season.

== Schedule ==
Date	Opponent	Site	Result	Attendance	Source
September 19	at Guilford	Greensboro, NC	W 35–27		
September 26	at Western Carolina	Memorial Stadium; Cullowhee, NC (rivalry)	W 17–10		
October 3	Elon	Conrad Stadium; Boone, NC	W 21–0	8,000	
October 10	at Lenoir Rhyne	College Field; Hickory, NC	L 12–21		
October 17	Catawba	Conrad Stadium; Boone, NC	W 48–21		
October 24	at Carson–Newman	Burke–Tarr Stadium; Jefferson City, TN	W 15–14		
October 31	East Tennessee State	Conrad Stadium; Boone, NC	L 7–9	5,000	
November 7	Samford	Conrad Stadium; Boone, NC	L 35–42	4,500	
November 14	Wofford	Conrad Stadium; Boone, NC	L 13–37	7,000	
November 21	at Troy State	Veterans Memorial Stadium; Troy, AL	L 0–42		
