= 2006 NCAA Division I Football Championship Game =

Postseason college football game

2006 NCAA Division I Football Championship
- FCS National Championship Game
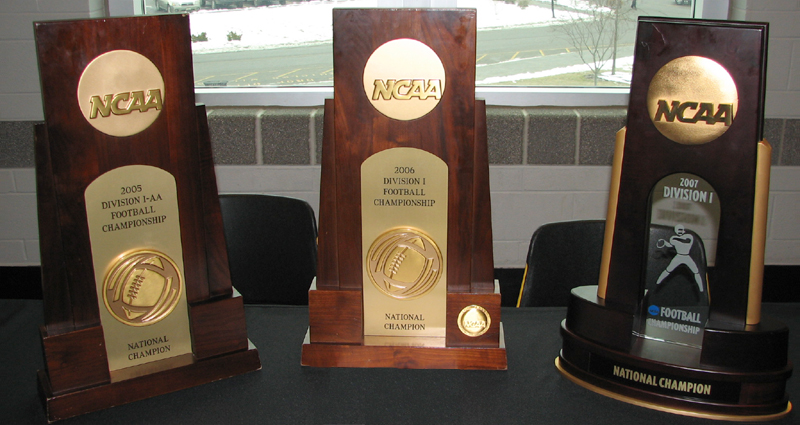
- 2006 FCS National Championship trophy (center)
Appalachian State Mountaineers	UMass Minutemen
(10–1)	(10–1)
SoCon	Atlantic 10
28	17
Head coach: Jerry Moore	Head coach: Don Brown
TSN / Seed; 1 / 1	TSN / Seed; 3 / 3
	1	2	3	4	Total
Appalachian State	7	7	0	14	28
UMass	7	0	7	3	17
- Date: December 15, 2006
- Season: 2006
- Stadium: Finley Stadium
- Location: Chattanooga, Tennessee
- National anthem: Trace Adkins
- Referee: J. Sullivan (Gateway)
- Attendance: 22,808

United States TV coverage
- Network: ESPN2
- Announcers: Dave Pasch (play-by-play), Rod Gilmore (color), Trevor Matich (color), Dave Ryan (sideline)

The 2006 NCAA Division I Football Championship Game was a postseason college football game between the UMass Minutemen and the Appalachian State Mountaineers. The game was played on December 15, 2006, at Finley Stadium, home field of the University of Tennessee at Chattanooga. This was the first season that the NCAA football classification formerly known as Division I-AA operated as the Football Championship Subdivision (FCS). The culminating game of the 2006 NCAA Division I FCS football season, it was won by Appalachian State, 28–17.

With sponsorship by Enterprise Rent-A-Car, the game was officially known as the NCAA Division I Championship presented by Enterprise Rent-A-Car.

== Teams ==
The participants of the Championship Game were the finalists of the 2006 FCS Playoffs, which began with a 16-team bracket.

=== Appalachian State Mountaineers ===
Appalachian State finished their regular season with a 10–1 record (7–0 in conference). Their only loss was to NC State of the FBS, in their first game of the season. The Mountaineers were the first-seed in the tournament and defeated Coastal Carolina, Montana State, and fourth-seed Youngstown State to reach the final. This was Appalachian State's second consecutive appearance in the championship game, having won the title in 2005.

=== UMass Minutemen ===
UMass finished their regular season with a 10–1 record (8–0 in conference). Their only loss was to Navy of the FBS, in their second game of the season. The Minutemen were the third-seed in the tournament and defeated Lafayette, New Hampshire, and second-seed Montana to reach the final. This was the third appearance for UMass in a Division I-AA/FCS championship game, having won in 1998 and having lost in 1978.

== Game summary ==
=== Scoring summary ===
Scoring summary

Quarter	Time	Drive			Team	Scoring information	Score	
Quarter	Time	Plays	Yards	TOP	Team	Scoring information	APP	MASS
1	11:49	8	80	3:11	MASS	Matt Lawrence 1-yard touchdown run, Chris Koepplin kick good	0	7
1	1:15	4	70	1:27	APP	Kevin Richardson 45-yard touchdown run, Julian Rauch kick good	7	7
2	0:49	11	78	4:19	APP	Richardson 6-yard touchdown run, Rauch kick good	14	7
3	4:22	11	81	4:25	MASS	Brad Listorti 17-yard touchdown reception from Liam Coen, Koepplin kick good	14	14
4	13:22	13	71	5:50	APP	Richardson 4-yard touchdown run, Rauch kick good	21	14
4	8:46	10	55	4:31	MASS	42-yard field goal by Koepplin	21	17
4	1:51	14	80	6:46	APP	Richardson 2-yard touchdown run, Rauch kick good	28	17
"TOP" = time of possession. For other American football terms, see Glossary of American football.							28	17

=== Game statistics ===
	1	2	3	4	Total
No. 1 Mountaineers	7	7	0	14	28
No. 3 Minutemen	7	0	7	3	17

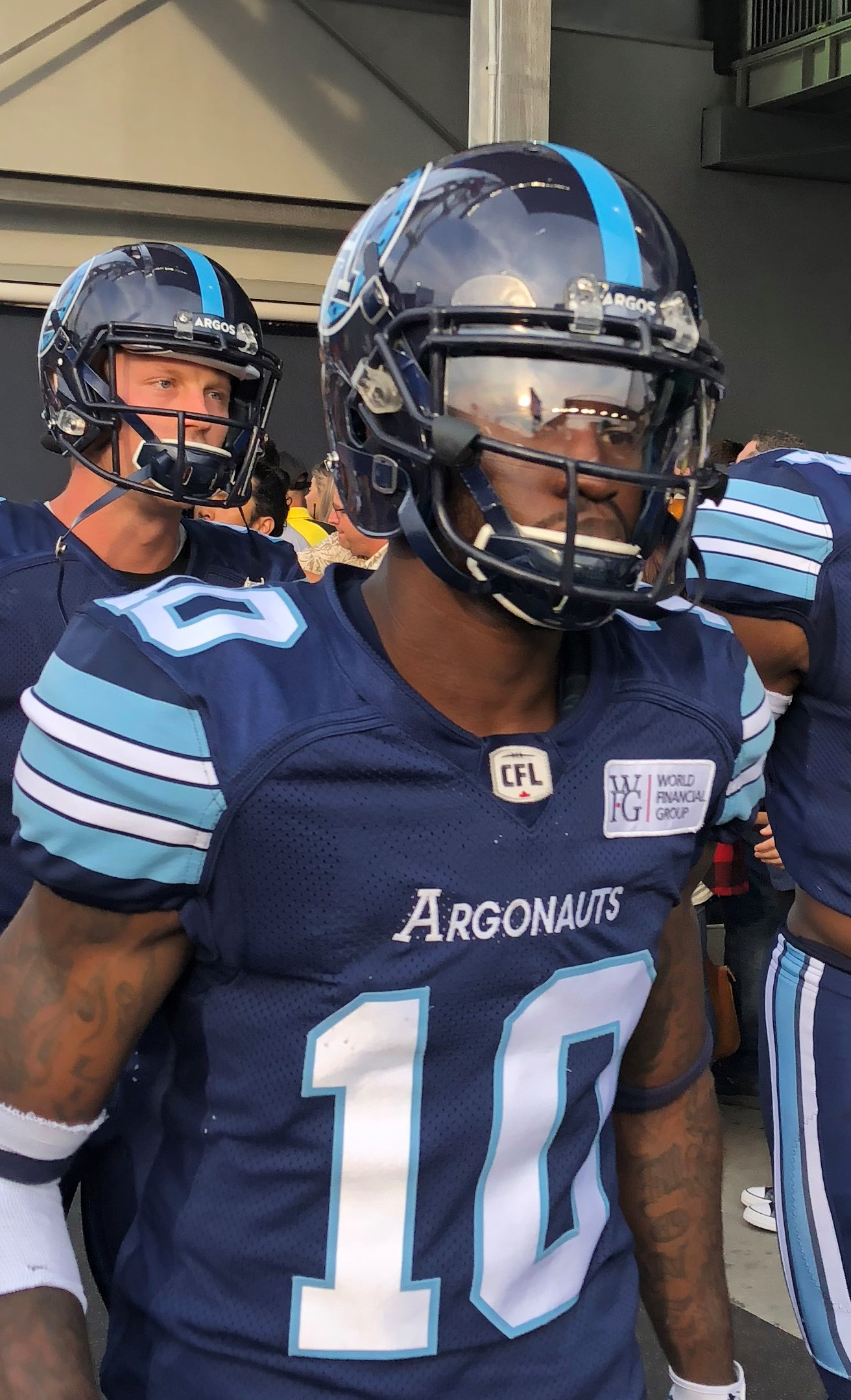
Appalachian State quarterback Armanti Edwards

Statistics	APP	MASS
First downs	24	19
Plays–yards	72–431	65–372
Rushes–yards	53–285	32–151
Passing yards	146	221
Passing: comp–att–int	12–19–1	20–33–2
Time of possession	33:10	26:50

Team	Category	Player	Statistics
Appalachian State	Passing	Armanti Edwards	12–19, 146 yds, 1 INT
Appalachian State	Rushing	Kevin Richardson	30 car, 179 yds, 4 TD
Appalachian State	Receiving	Dexter Jackson; William Mayfield	3 rec, 44 yds 3 rec, 44 yds
UMass	Passing	Liam Coen	20–33, 221 yds, 1 TD, 2 INT
UMass	Rushing	Steve Baylark	24 car, 133 yds
UMass	Receiving	Brad Listorti	5 rec, 78 yds, 1 TD
