= 1968 Appalachian State Mountaineers football team =

American college football season

1968 Appalachian State Mountaineers football
- Conference: Independent
- Record: 8–2
- Head coach: Carl Messere (4th season)
- Home stadium: Conrad Stadium

1968 NAIA independents football records
	Conf.			Overall
Team	W	L	T	W		L		T
No. 7 Doane		–		10	–	0	–	0
New Mexico Highlands		–		9	–	0	–	0
No. 15 Ferris State		–		7	–	0	–	1
No. 9 Cal Lutheran		–		9	–	1	–	0
No. 10 Emory and Henry		–		9	–	1	–	0
Indiana (PA)		–		9	–	1	–	0
No. 16 Austin		–		8	–	1	–	0
No. 11 Appalachian State		–		8	–	2	–	0
Boise State		–		8	–	2	–	0
No. 20 Carson–Newman		–		8	–	2	–	0
La Verne		–		7	–	2	–	0
Hillsdale		–		6	–	3	–	0
St. Mary of the Plains		–		6	–	4	–	0
Oklahoma Panhandle State		–		5	–	5	–	1
Eastern New Mexico		–		4	–	5	–	1
Simon Fraser		–		4	–	5	–	0
Southern Colorado State		–		4	–	6	–	0
Southwest State (MN)		–		3	–	5	–	0
Wofford		–		4	–	7	–	0
Westminster (UT)		–		3	–	6	–	0
Georgetown (KY)		–		2	–	6	–	0
Azusa Pacific		–		2	–	7	–	0
Kentucky State		–		2	–	7	–	0
Missouri Southern		–		2	–	8	–	0
Iowa Wesleyan		–		1	–	7	–	1
Rankings from NAIA poll

The 1968 Appalachian State Mountaineers football team was an American football team that represented Appalachian State University as an independent during the 1968 NAIA football season. In their fourth year under head coach Carl Messere, the Mountaineers compiled an overall record of 8–2.

== Schedule ==
Date	Opponent	Site	Result	Attendance	Source
September 21	at Newberry	Setzler Field; Newberry, SC	W 55–14	4,000	
September 28	at Western Carolina	Memorial Stadium; Cullowhee, NC (rivalry)	W 28–14	5,500	
October 5	Elon	Conrad Stadium; Boone, NC	W 70–26	6,500	
October 12	at Lenoir Rhyne	College Field; Hickory, NC	W 41–28	12,500	
October 19	Catawba	Conrad Stadium; Boone, NC	W 41–14	7,224	
October 26	at Carson–Newman	Burke–Tarr Stadium; Jefferson City, TN	L 28–35	8,000	
November 2	Wofford	Conrad Stadium; Boone, NC	W 47–28	3,800	
November 9	at Presbyterian	Bailey Stadium; Clinton, SC	W 42–6	2,000	
November 16	Emory & Henry	Conrad Stadium; Boone, NC	L 28–34	5,153	
November 23	Guilford	Conrad Stadium; Boone, NC	W 29–22	4,500	
