= Brad Listorti =

American football player (born 1984)

Profile
- Position: Tight end

Personal information
- Born: October 11, 1984 (age 42); Milford, Connecticut, U.S.
- Listed height: 6 ft 4 in (1.93 m)
- Listed weight: 255 lb (116 kg)

Career information
- High school: Notre Dame (West Haven, Connecticut)
- College: Massachusetts
- NFL draft: 2008: undrafted

Career history
- Atlanta Falcons (2008)*; New York Jets (2008)*; New England Patriots (2009)*
- * Offseason or practice squad member only

Awards and highlights
- Third-team All-A-10 (2006)

Bradley R. Listorti (born October 11, 1984) is an American former football tight end. He was signed by the Atlanta Falcons as an undrafted free agent in 2008. He played college football at Massachusetts.

Listorti was also a member of the New York Jets and New England Patriots.
