= Kevin Richardson (American football) =

American football player (born 1986)

No. 28
- Position: Running back

Personal information
- Born: May 15, 1986 (age 40); Elizabethtown, North Carolina, U.S.
- Listed height: 5 ft 9 in (1.75 m)
- Listed weight: 190 lb (86 kg)

Career information
- High school: East Bladen (NC)
- College: Appalachian State (2004–2007)

Awards and highlights
- 3× NCAA Division I-AA/FCS national champion (2005, 2006, 2007)

Kevin Lamont Richardson (born May 15, 1986) is an American former college football player. He was the starting running back for the Appalachian State Mountaineers from 2005 to 2007. He holds school records for the most rushing yards in a single season (1,676 in 2006), the highest career all-purpose yardage (6,104), and the most rushing touchdowns in a single season (30 in 2006), while also gaining the 2nd most career rushing yards (4,804). Richardson was a key contributor to three seasons of unprecedented success for the Mountaineers. He scored multiple touchdowns in all three of the team's FCS championship victories, and he rushed for 88 yards in the Mountaineers' 34–32 upset victory over the then No. 5 ranked Michigan Wolverines of the Football Bowl Subdivision.
