= Björn Nittmo =

American football player (born 1966)

No. 3, 5, 16
- Position: Placekicker

Personal information
- Born: July 26, 1966 (age 60); Lomma, Sweden
- Listed height: 5 ft 11 in (1.80 m)
- Listed weight: 185 lb (84 kg)

Career information
- High school: Enterprise (AL)
- College: Appalachian State
- NFL draft: 1989: undrafted

Career history
- New York Giants (1989); Kansas City Chiefs (1990)*; Montreal Machine (1991); Buffalo Bills (1991)*; Houston Oilers (1992)*; Montreal Machine (1992); Cleveland Thunderbolts (1993); Shreveport Pirates (1994–1995); Kansas City Chiefs (1996)*; Tampa Bay Buccaneers (1997)*; Tampa Bay Storm (1998); Buffalo Destroyers (1999); Arizona Rattlers (2000); Carolina Cobras (2001); Ottawa Renegades (2005)*
- * Offseason or practice squad member only

Awards and highlights
- All-World League (1991)

Career NFL statistics
- Field goals made: 9
- Field goal attempts: 12
- Field goal %: 75.0
- Longest field goal: 39
- Stats at Pro Football Reference

Career AFL statistics
- Field goals Made: 60
- Field goal attempts: 162
- PAT Made: 273
- PAT Att: 298
- Tackles: 17
- Stats at ArenaFan.com

Björn Arne Nittmo (born July 26, 1966) is a Swedish former professional football placekicker, being the only Swedish-born player to complete a full season in the National Football League (NFL).

== Football career ==
The left-footed Nittmo, famous for his very long kickoffs, came to the U.S. as a foreign exchange student at Enterprise High School in Enterprise, Alabama. After high school, he played college football at Appalachian State University (1985–1988), where he also was the all-time leading scorer with 277 points. In 2003, he was named to the University's 75th Anniversary Football Team.

After Nittmo went unselected in the 1989 NFL draft, he was signed to the New York Giants and was the first Swedish-born player to finish a full season in the NFL. His six games is the second-most played games by a Swedish player in the Super Bowl era after Chris Gartner (1974, 11 games). The following year, he tried to make the Kansas City Chiefs' final roster, but was cut. In 1991, Nittmo was hired by the Buffalo Bills as a potential replacement for Scott Norwood after his infamous wide-right kick in Super Bowl XXV (the Bills nonetheless decided to keep Norwood for one more season instead).

Nittmo's career included time with the Montreal Machine of the World League of American Football (this league later became NFL Europe), the Cleveland Thunderbolts, Arizona Rattlers, and Tampa Bay Storm of the Arena Football League, as well as the Shreveport Pirates of the Canadian Football League. In 2005, Nittmo was invited to the Ottawa Renegades' training camp, but was cut prior to the start of the season.

== In popular culture ==
Nittmo appeared on Late Night with David Letterman a few times during his stint with the New York Giants. Letterman seemed to be obsessed with the kicker's name and even coined a new catchphrase to both celebrate and mock him; "Who do you think you are, Björn Nittmo?" Nittmo's celebrity continued in 1999 when he appeared as the kicker in Oliver Stone's Any Given Sunday. He later starred in a 2015 mini-documentary, NITTMO, about his life, to inspire the Swedish youth to follow their dreams and study abroad.

== Personal life ==
Nittmo has been estranged from his ex-wife, Mary Lois Nittmo, and his four children (three daughters and a son), for over a decade. He suffered severe brain damage from a hit he sustained in a 1997 preseason contest. Such was the extent of the damage from that, and other hits sustained on kickoffs, that his ex-wife banned football within the family household, refusing to watch any games on television or let their son play the game. In 2017, as part of a meeting arranged by The Buffalo News, Mary Lois went to Björn's home in Arizona, where he explained his absence and behavior; he stated that he mainly lives alone and is self-employed for his children's safety, that the short-term memory loss has been a hindrance to his employability, and that attempts to treat his condition have so far not succeeded. In April 2017, ESPN's SC Featured anthology recounted Nittmo's story.
