= Taylor Lamb =

American football player and coach (born 1994)

Current position
- Title: Quarterbacks coach
- Team: Virginia
- Conference: ACC

Biographical details
- Born: April 12, 1994 (age 32)

Playing career
- 2013–2017: Appalachian State
- Position: Quarterback

Coaching career (HC unless noted)
- 2018–2019: South Carolina (GA)
- 2020: Gardner–Webb (QB)
- 2021: Gardner–Webb (OC/QB)
- 2022–present: Virginia (QB)

Taylor Boyd Lamb (born April 12, 1994) is an American football coach and former quarterback, who is currently the quarterbacks coach for the Virginia Cavaliers. He played college football for the Appalachian State Mountaineers.

== Early life ==
Lamb attended Calhoun High School in Calhoun, Georgia. As a senior, he was named the Gatorade Georgia Football Player of the Year, throwing for 3,498 yds and 26 touchdowns. Following his high school career, Lamb committed to play college football at Appalachian State University.

== College career ==
After redshirting in 2013, Lamb entered the 2014 season as the backup to Kameron Bryant. He earned his first career start against Southern Miss, throwing for 264 yards, two touchdowns, and two interceptions. Lamb was named the Sun Belt Conference Freshman of the Year, after throwing for 2,381 yards and 17 touchdowns. As a redshirt sophomore in 2015, he totaled 2,387 yards passing with 31 touchdown passes. In 2016, Lamb threw for 2,281 yards and 15 touchdowns, while also rushing for 506 yards and nine touchdowns. In the 2016 Camellia Bowl against Toledo, he accounted for 245 total yards and two touchdowns, being named the game's MVP. During the 2017 season, Lamb broke the Sun Belt record for passing touchdowns in a career. He finished his final season throwing for 2,737 yards and 27 touchdowns. As a result, Lamb was named the 2017-18 Sun Belt Conference Male Athlete of the Year.

Lamb started 49 games for the Mountaineers, recording 9,786 passing yards, 2,008 rushing yards, 90 touchdown passes, and 23 rushing touchdowns.

=== Statistics ===
Season	Team	Games			Passing								Rushing			
Season	Team	GP	GS	Record	Cmp	Att	Pct	Yds	Avg	TD	Int	Rtg	Att	Yds	Avg	TD
2013	Appalachian State	Redshirted (redshirt)														
2014	Appalachian State	12	10	6–4	181	295	61.4	2,381	8.1	17	9	142.1	78	483	6.2	4
2015	Appalachian State	13	13	11–2	170	283	60.1	2,387	8.4	31	9	160.7	85	436	5.1	5
2016	Appalachian State	13	13	10–3	197	325	60.6	2,281	7.0	15	8	129.9	89	506	5.7	9
2017	Appalachian State	13	13	9–4	206	337	61.1	2,737	8.1	27	6	152.2	78	584	7.5	5
Career		51	49	36−13	754	1,240	60.8	9,786	7.9	90	32	145.9	330	2,009	6.1	23

== Coaching career ==
After his senior season at Appalachian State, Lamb joined South Carolina as a graduate assistant. After two seasons with South Carolina, he joined Gardner–Webb as the quarterbacks coach. In his second year at Gardner–Webb, he was promoted to the role of offensive coordinator. In January 2022, Lamb was hired by Tony Elliott at Virginia as the quarterbacks coach.

== Personal life ==
Lamb's father, Bobby, is the head coach of the Anderson Trojans; his cousin, Tre, is the head coach of the Tulsa Golden Hurricane.
