= Dino Hackett =

American football player (born 1964)

No. 56, 55
- Position: Linebacker

Personal information
- Born: June 28, 1964 (age 62); Greensboro, North Carolina, U.S.
- Listed height: 6 ft 3 in (1.91 m)
- Listed weight: 228 lb (103 kg)

Career information
- High school: Southern Guilford (Greensboro)
- College: Appalachian State (1982–1985)
- NFL draft: 1986: 2nd round, 35th overall pick

Career history
- Kansas City Chiefs (1986–1992); Seattle Seahawks (1993)

Awards and highlights
- Pro Bowl (1988); PFWA All-Rookie Team (1986); Appalachian State Mountaineers No. 38 retired

Career NFL statistics
- Fumble recoveries: 6
- Interceptions: 1
- Safeties: 1
- Sacks: 9
- Stats at Pro Football Reference

Barry Dean "Dino" Hackett (born June 28, 1964) is an American former professional football player who was a linebacker in the National Football League (NFL) for the Kansas City Chiefs from 1986 to 1991 and for the Seattle Seahawks in his final season in 1993. He was selected by the Chiefs in the second round of the 1986 NFL draft.
