= Jason Hunter (American football) =

American football player (born 1983)

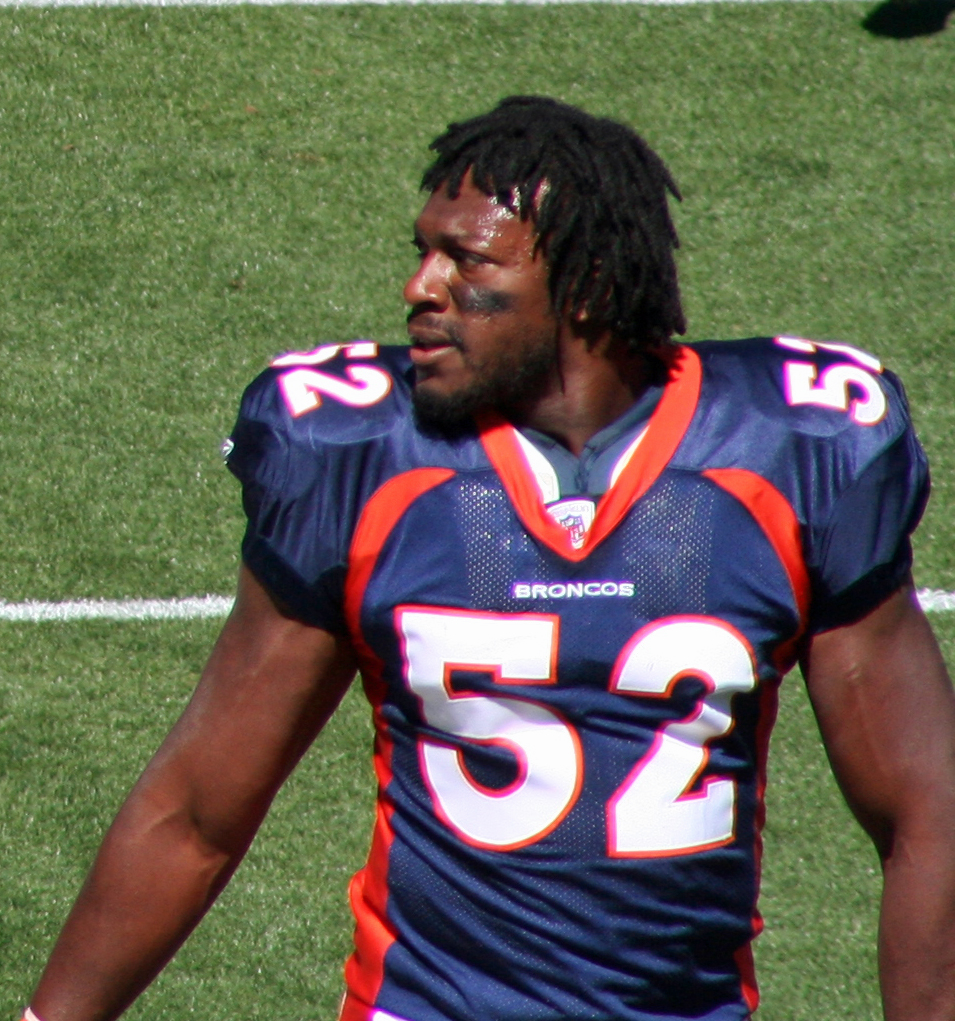
- Hunter with the Denver Broncos in 2010

No. 57, 97, 52, 90, 93
- Position: Defensive end

Personal information
- Born: August 28, 1983 (age 43); Charlotte, North Carolina, U.S.
- Listed height: 6 ft 4 in (1.93 m)
- Listed weight: 271 lb (123 kg)

Career information
- High school: E. E. Smith (Fayetteville, North Carolina)
- College: Appalachian State (2001–2005)
- NFL draft: 2006: undrafted

Career history
- Green Bay Packers (2006–2008); Detroit Lions (2009); Denver Broncos (2010–2012); Oakland Raiders (2013)

Awards and highlights
- NCAA Division I-AA national champion (2005); Second-team NCAA Division I-AA All-American (2005); First-team All-SoCon (2005)

Career NFL statistics
- Total tackles: 175
- Sacks: 14
- Forced fumbles: 4
- Fumble recoveries: 7
- Interceptions: 1
- Defensive touchdowns: 2
- Stats at Pro Football Reference

Jason Terrell Hunter (born August 28, 1983) is an American former professional football player who was a defensive end in the National Football League (NFL). He played college football for the Appalachian State Mountaineers before being signed by the Green Bay Packers as an undrafted free agent in 2006.

Hunter also played for the Detroit Lions, Denver Broncos, and Oakland Raiders.

== College career ==
During his college tenure at Appalachian State University in Boone, North Carolina, Hunter was instrumental in his team achieving the NCAA Division I-AA Football national championship in 2005, a year in which he was named an All-Conference and Second-team All-American honoree. As a senior in 2005, Hunter had 101 tackles (51 solo) 24.5 tackles for loss and 13 sacks in 15 starts. He also had three defensive touchdowns, two off of fumbles and one off an interception. In 2003, he finished with 31 tackles (16 solo), including two stops for loss and 2 sacks, in 11 games. In 2002, he played in 12 games, collecting 33 tackles (19 solo), including five stops for loss, three sacks, and four passes defensed. In 2001 as a true freshman, he had 26 tackles (23 solo), including seven stops for loss and six sacks, three forced fumbles and two fumble recoveries in 12 games. In 50 games over four years at Appalachian State, concluded college career with 191 tackles (109 solo), 38.5 stops for loss, 24 sacks, nine passes defensed, five forced fumbles, five fumble recoveries and one interception.

== Professional career ==
=== Pre-draft ===
Hunter at 6–4, 260 pounds ran a 4.88 second 40-yard dash.

=== Green Bay Packers ===
Hunter was signed by the Green Bay Packers as an undrafted rookie free agent in 2006, he earned a roster spot in 2006 training camp and played in 14 games as a rookie. He saw limited play on defense in seven contests and recorded a pair of solo tackles He had also had eight special teams tackles and registered the Packers’ lone 2006 onside kick recovery. In the 2007 season Hunter was a key to the Packers special teams unit, acquiring 15 tackles and a forced fumble. In week 11 of the 2008 season Hunter returned a fumble 55 yards for a touchdown against the Chicago Bears. Hunter became a restricted Free Agent after the season but was re signed by the Packers on March 16, 2009. However, the Packers waived him on May 4.

=== Detroit Lions ===
Hunter was signed by the Detroit Lions on May 6, 2009. After one season with Detroit, Hunter was released on August 16, 2010.

=== Denver Broncos ===
Hunter signed with the Denver Broncos on August 20, 2010. Following his signing he was informed by the team that he would be playing a new position. He was moved to linebacker from defensive end. "They said I'm going to be a linebacker here. I've never played 'backer in my life, so this is going to be a huge challenge for me," Hunter said. "I'm going to have to work hard every day and challenge myself."

During the 2011 Season, Jason was placed back into the Defensive end position under the new system of John Fox. He was replacing Elvis Dumervil while Dumervil was injured.

=== Oakland Raiders ===
Hunter signed with the Oakland Raiders on March 13, 2013. At the end of the NFL 2013 season Jason Hunter became a free agent.

== NFL career statistics ==
Legend
	Led the league
**Bold**	Career high

=== Regular season ===
Year	Team	Games		Tackles					Interceptions					Fumbles			
Year	Team	GP	GS	Cmb	Solo	Ast	Sck	TFL	Int	Yds	TD	Lng	PD	FF	FR	Yds	TD
2006	GNB	14	0	8	6	2	0.0	0	0	0	0	0	0	0	0	0	0
2007	GNB	**16**	0	15	11	4	0.0	0	0	0	0	0	0	**1**	0	0	0
2008	GNB	12	0	9	4	5	2.0	1	0	0	0	0	0	0	1	54	**1**
2009	DET	14	9	34	27	7	**5.0**	9	0	0	0	0	**3**	0	**2**	0	0
2010	DEN	**16**	**12**	**61**	**50**	**11**	3.0	**10**	**1**	**14**	0	**14**	2	**1**	**2**	**75**	**1**
2011	DEN	**16**	2	21	17	4	1.0	2	0	0	0	0	1	**1**	1	18	0
2013	OAK	13	10	27	19	8	3.0	4	0	0	0	0	2	**1**	1	15	0
Career		101	33	175	134	41	14.0	26	1	14	0	14	8	4	7	162	2

=== Playoffs ===
Year	Team	Games		Tackles					Interceptions					Fumbles			
Year	Team	GP	GS	Cmb	Solo	Ast	Sck	TFL	Int	Yds	TD	Lng	PD	FF	FR	Yds	TD
2007	GNB	**2**	0	**4**	0	**4**	0.0	0	0	0	0	0	0	0	0	0	0
2011	DEN	**2**	0	**4**	**2**	2	0.0	0	0	0	0	0	0	0	0	0	0
Career		4	0	8	2	6	0.0	0	0	0	0	0	0	0	0	0	0

== Stabbing ==
On April 27, 2011, Detroit police said that Hunter had been stabbed and taken to a local hospital. Officer Dan Donakowski said that Hunter had been stabbed that Wednesday, but police didn't have any additional information (including where the incident took place, who was responsible and Hunter's condition). The hospital wasn't disclosed. The Broncos released a statement saying the team hoped Hunter would “make[s] a quick recovery,” but that out of respect for his privacy, it wouldn't comment further.
