= Richie Williams (Canadian football) =

American gridiron football player (born 1983)

No. 7
- Position: Quarterback

Personal information
- Born: March 10, 1983 (age 43); Camden, South Carolina, U.S.
- Listed height: 6 ft 3 in (1.91 m)
- Listed weight: 190 lb (86 kg)

Career information
- College: Appalachian State

Career history
- 2006–08: Hamilton Tiger-Cats
- 2009: Winnipeg Blue Bombers

Awards and highlights
- SoCon Male Athlete of the Year (2005–06); SoCon Offensive Player of the Year (2005)

Career CFL statistics
- TD–INT: 11–9
- Yards passing: 2,077
- QB rating: 84.7
- Comp–Att: 157–262
- Completion percentage: 59.9
- Stats at CFL.ca

Richie Williams (born March 10, 1983) is an American former professional football quarterback, and is now a jack man for Jamie McMurray in the Monster Energy Cup Series stock car racing leagues. He was originally signed as a free agent by the Hamilton Tiger-Cats after a collegiate career at Appalachian State University.

== College career ==
Williams became Appalachian State's starting quarterback during his junior year in 2004 in which the Mountaineers finished with a disappointing 6–5 overall record. However, on October 9, 2004, against Furman University, Williams completed 40 of 45 passes thrown for an all divisions NCAA record for single game accuracy. Additionally, he completed 28 straight passes which also established an NCAA mark.

The 2005 season saw the fortunes of the Mountaineers turn around as Williams led the team to a 12–3 record and the 2005 NCAA Division I Football Championship. It was the first NCAA national title won by a college football team from North Carolina. He was honored with the Southern Conference Offensive Player of the Year Award in November 2005. Williams also received the coveted Bob Waters Award as the Southern Conference Male Athlete of the Year at the conclusion of the 2005–06 athletics season.

=== Statistics ===
Season	Passing								Rushing
Season	GP	Rating	Comp	Att	%	Yards	TD	INT	Att	Yards	Avg	TD
2004	10	158.39	234	350	66.9	3,109	24	10	137	284	2.1	8
2005	15	149.40	211	338	62.4	2,809	20	4	148	842	5.7	5
Totals	25	153.90	445	688	64.7	5,918	44	14	285	1,126	3.9	13

== Professional career ==
Williams signed as a free agent with the Tiger-Cats before the start of the 2006 season, but playing time was limited during his three years with Hamilton. He saw action in 52 games and was honored as the CFL's Offensive Player of the Week in which he led the Tiger-Cats to a 45–21 rout of the Toronto Argonauts in Week 7 of the 2008 season. After being released from the Tiger-Cats, Williams signed a contract with the Winnipeg Blue Bombers on June 8, 2009. He was released on July 29, 2009.

=== Statistics ===
Season	Passing								Rushing
Season	Team	Rating	Comp	Att	%	Yards	TD	INT	Att	Yards	Avg	TD
2006	HAM	85.6	17	32	53.1	241	2	1	4	55	13.8	0
2007	HAM	86.4	80	130	61.5	852	6	3	32	169	5.3	0
2008	HAM	82.3	60	100	60.0	984	3	5	43	307	7.1	2
Totals		84.7	157	262	59.9	2,077	11	9	79	531	6.7	2
