= Armanti Edwards =

American gridiron football player (born 1988)

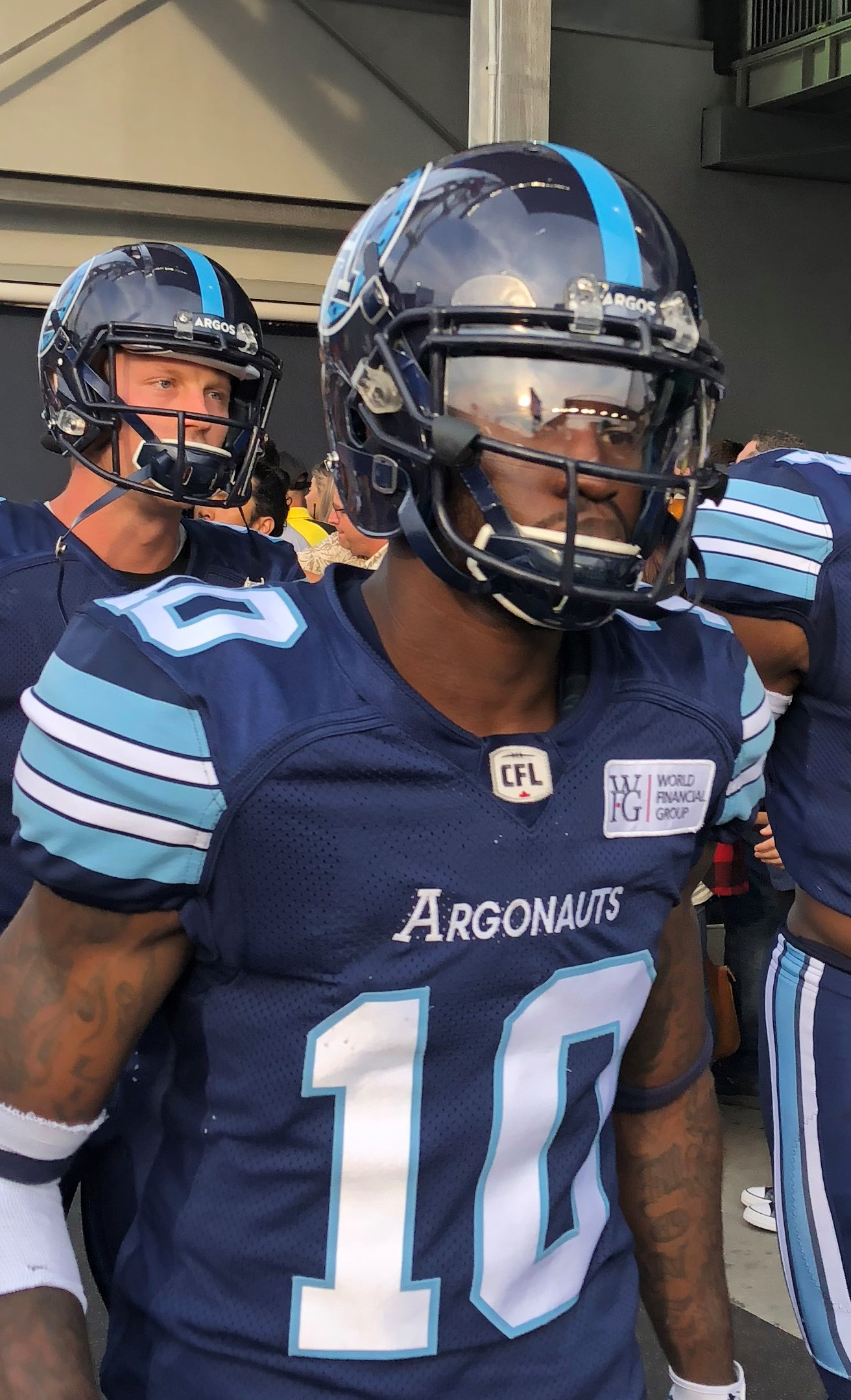
- Edwards with the Toronto Argonauts in 2018

No. 10, 14
- Positions: Wide receiver, quarterback

Personal information
- Born: March 8, 1988 (age 38); Greenwood, South Carolina, U.S.
- Listed height: 5 ft 11 in (1.80 m)
- Listed weight: 183 lb (83 kg)

Career information
- High school: Greenwood
- College: Appalachian State (2006–2009)
- NFL draft: 2010: 3rd round, 89th overall pick

Career history
- Carolina Panthers (2010–2013); Cleveland Browns (2013); Chicago Bears (2014)*; Saskatchewan Roughriders (2016); Toronto Argonauts (2017–2019); Team 9 (2020)*; Dallas Renegades (2020); Edmonton Eskimos / Elks (2020–2021)
- * Offseason or practice squad member only

Awards and highlights
- Grey Cup champion (2017); 2× NCAA FCS national champion (2006, 2007); 2× Walter Payton Award (2008, 2009); 2× SoCon Offensive Player of the Year (2008, 2009); 3× First-team All-SoCon (2006, 2008, 2009); Second-team All-SoCon (2007); Appalachian State Mountaineers No. 14 retired

Career NFL statistics
- Receptions: 6
- Receiving yards: 131
- Stats at Pro Football Reference

Career CFL statistics
- Receptions: 244
- Receiving yards: 3,181
- Receiving touchdowns: 16
- Stats at CFL.ca
- College Football Hall of Fame

Armanti Fredrico Edwards Sr. (born March 8, 1988) is an American former professional football player who was a wide receiver in the Canadian Football League (CFL) and National Football League (NFL). He played college football as a quarterback for the Appalachian State Mountaineers from 2006 to 2009, and was named a 2024 inductee of College Football Hall of Fame. Edwards led Appalachian State to one of the biggest upsets in college football history, a 34–32 victory over then fifth-ranked Michigan in 2007. He was selected by the Carolina Panthers in the third round of the 2010 NFL draft. In 2017, Edwards won the Grey Cup with the Toronto Argonauts. He last played for the CFL's Edmonton Elks.

In addition to leading Appalachian State to consecutive NCAA Division I Football Championships (FCS) in 2006 and 2007, Edwards became the first quarterback in Southern Conference history to lead his team to four straight conference championships. He became the first quarterback in NCAA Division I history to throw for 9,000 and rush for 4,000 yards in a career, accomplishing the feat against Furman on October 31, 2009. Later in the season, he would become the first quarterback to pass for over 10,000 yards and rush for an additional 4,000 yards in a career. He is also the first back-to-back and two-time Walter Payton Award winner, given to the Football Championship Subdivision's most outstanding offensive player, receiving the award in 2008 and 2009.

== Early life ==
Armanti is the son of Deborah Anderson and Freddie Edwards. At birth, Edwards weighed 4 pounds 11 ounces and was delivered 10 days late. In September 2006, his father, Freddie, was convicted of a 2005 murder and sentenced to 30 years in prison. The conviction however was overturned because jurors were not given the option of finding Edwards guilty of involuntary manslaughter. During a retrial that concluded in June 2011 he was again convicted of murder and again sentenced to 30 years.

== High school career ==
At Greenwood High, under coach Shell Dula, he was named to the Greenwood Touchdown Club/Index-Journal All-Lakelands Team. Edwards originally played wide receiver, but in his senior year, he moved under center. The transition occurred late in the recruiting process, and he drew some interest from New Mexico State, Memphis, South Carolina, and Vanderbilt. After only receiving an offer from New Mexico State, he decided to honor his commitment to Appalachian State, in part because they would let him stay a quarterback. Armanti Edwards graduated with a 3.3 GPA.

== College career ==
=== 2006 season ===
Armanti Edwards led the Mountaineers to the FCS (formerly Division I-AA) National Championship in 2006 as a true freshman, beating the Minutemen of UMass 28–17. He finished the 2006 season with 2,251 yards and 15 touchdowns passing, and 1,153 yards and 15 touchdowns rushing. Edwards joined a select list as the fifth Division I player (Missouri's Brad Smith and Texas's Vince Young are among the others), and second freshman, to accomplish the feat of 2000 passing yards and 1000 rushing yards in one season. Edwards was named the Southern Conference Freshman of the Year at the end of the season.

=== 2007 season ===
Edwards started the 2007 season by guiding Appalachian State to a 34–32 upset victory over fifth-ranked Michigan of the Football Bowl Subdivision on September 1, in a game that was named the "Biggest Upset of 2007" by Sports Illustrated. In the game, Edwards threw for 227 yards and three touchdowns while also totaling 62 yards and a touchdown on the ground. On December 7, in a semifinal playoff game against Richmond, Edwards set the single game FCS rushing record for a quarterback, rushing for 313 yards and 4 touchdowns on 31 carries. He also completed 14-of-16 passes for 192 yards and 3 touchdowns. Edwards had been mentioned as a possible candidate for the Heisman Trophy in the 2008 season. Edwards established himself as a threat through the air and along the ground, and garnered elite status within the division. He and the Mountaineers won a third consecutive national championship, beating the Delaware Fightin' Blue Hens, 49–21, in the championship game on December 14. He outplayed future Baltimore Ravens quarterback Joe Flacco in that game.

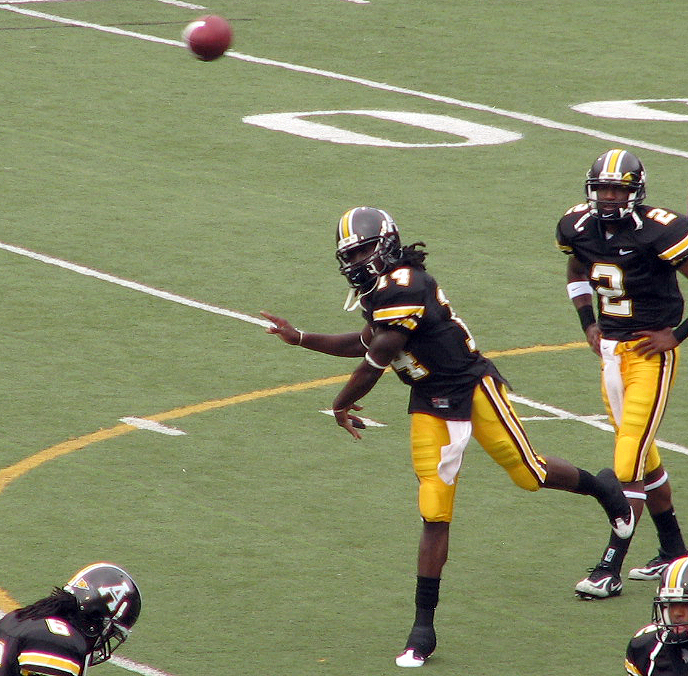
Edwards warms up prior to a game against Jacksonville University in 2008.

=== 2008 season ===
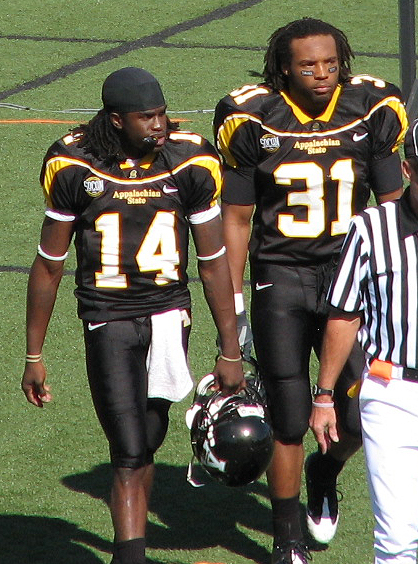
Edwards (#14) with Pierre Banks (#31) in 2008.

The Mountaineers began the 2008 campaign against the LSU Tigers, the first time defending FBS and FCS champions have met to open the season. However, LSU prevailed 41–13, with Edwards accounting for 216 of Appalachian State's 472 total yards. Edwards accounted for 440 yards of total offense, becoming the Southern Conference's all-time leader in yards with a 70–24 victory over the Wofford Terriers on October 31. On November 15, the Mountaineers clinched the Southern Conference championship, joining West Virginia (1953–56), Furman (1980–83) and Georgia Southern (1997–2002) as the only programs to win four straight titles, with a 24–16 victory over the Elon Phoenix. In his 36th career start, he became the 26th FCS player in history to surpass 10,000 yards of career total offense in Appalachian's win over South Carolina State in the First Round of the 2008 playoffs. He was named the 2008 Southern Conference Offensive Player of the Year, and was the winner of the 2008 Walter Payton Award, given to the top FCS offensive player. Edwards threw a career-worst 5 interceptions in a quarterfinal loss to eventual tournament winner, Richmond, denying Appalachian State their 4th consecutive FCS championship.

=== 2009 season ===
Before the start of the season, Edwards was involved in a lawn mowing accident, resulting in a trip to the hospital where he was treated and released. The injury sidelined him for the season opener against the East Carolina Pirates, a game which the Mountaineers would lose 29–24. With a 27–10 victory over Elon on November 14, Edwards became the only quarterback in conference history to win four consecutive championships. Edwards's college football career ended on December 12 in a playoff semi-final game against the Montana Grizzlies. The 24–17 loss was the highest rated FCS postseason game ever broadcast according to Nielsen and the NCAA. The following day, Edwards graduated after just three and a half years with a degree in graphic arts. On December 17, in a landslide victory, Edwards received the Walter Payton Award making him the first ever two-time recipient of the award. On August 24, 2023, Appalachian State announced it would be retiring Edwards No. 14 jersey number.

=== Statistics ===
Season	Passing									Rushing
Season	GP	GS	Rating	Comp	Att	%	Yards	TD	INT	Att	Yards	Avg	TD
2006	15	13	140.72	167	274	60.9	2,251	15	10	188	1,153	6.1	15
2007	11	11	159.34	148	222	66.7	1,948	17	7	237	1,588	6.7	21
2008	13	13	170.20	196	306	64.1	2,902	30	9	193	941	4.9	11
2009	12	12	147.90	257	378	68.0	3,291	12	7	137	679	5.0	18
Totals	51	49	154.54	768	1,180	65.1	10,392	74	33	755	4,361	5.8	65

=== Highlights and awards ===
==== Championships ====
- NCAA Division I Football Championship – 2006, 2007
- Southern Conference Championship – 2006, 2007, 2008, 2009

==== Awards ====
- Walter Payton Award – 2008, 2009
- Southern Conference Bob Waters Male Athlete of the Year – 2010
- Southern Conference Roy M. "Legs" Hawley Offensive Player of the Year (media) – 2008*, 2009*
- Southern Conference Offensive Player of the Year (coaches) – 2008, 2009
- Southern Conference Freshman of the Year (coaches and media) – 2006
- All-Southern Conference Football Team:
  - 1st Team (media) – 2006, 2008, 2009
  - 1st Team (coaches) – 2006, 2008, 2009
  - 2nd Team (coaches) – 2007
- 5x Southern Conference Offensive Player of the Month – 11/2006, 11/2007, 10/2008, 11/2008, 10/2009
- 8x Southern Conference Offensive Player of the Week
- 5x Southern Conference Freshman of the Week

* – Unanimous selection

==== Records ====
===== Single game =====
- ASU and Southern – Rushing: 313 vs. Richmond, 2007
- ASU – Rushing Yards Per Attempts: 10.1 vs. Richmond, 2007
- ASU, Southern, and NCAA – Rushing Yards by a Quarterback: 313 vs. Richmond, 2007
- ASU – Passing Yards: 433 vs. South Carolina State, 2008
- ASU – Completion Percentage (min. 10 comp.): .895 (17–19) vs. Wofford, 2008
- ASU – Touchdown Passes: 5 vs. Wofford, 2008
- ASU – Touchdowns Responsible For: 7 vs. Richmond, 2007

===== Single season =====
- ASU – Rushing Yards by a Quarterback: 1,588, 2007
- ASU – Rushing Yards by a Freshman: 1,153, 2006
- ASU – Rushing Yards by a Sophomore: 1,588, 2007
- ASU – Passing Yards: 3,291, 2009
- ASU – Pass Attempts: 378, 2009
- ASU – Pass Completions: 257, 2009
- ASU – Completion Percentage (min. 100 comp.): .680 (257–378), 2009
- ASU – Passing Efficiency: 170.2, 2008
- ASU – Touchdown Passes: 30, 2008
- ASU – 200-Yard Passing Games: 10, 2009
- ASU – Consecutive 200-Yard Passing Games: 5, 2009
- ASU – Passing Yards by a Freshman: 2,251, 2006
- ASU – Passing Yards by a Sophomore: 1,948, 2007
- ASU – Passing Yards by a Senior: 3,291, 2009
- ASU and Southern – Total Offense: 3,970, 2009
- ASU and Southern – Touchdowns Responsible For: 41, 2008
- ASU and Southern – 250-Yard Total Offense Games: 10, 2008
- ASU – Consecutive 250-Yard Total Offense Games: 5 (four times)
- ASU and Southern – 300-Yard Total Offense Games: 8, 2009
- ASU – 400-Yard Total Offense Games: 4, 2009
- ASU – Wins By a Starting Quarterback: 13, 2006

===== Postseason =====
- ASU – Single-Game Rushing Yards: 313 vs. Richmond, 2007
- ASU – Single-Game Rushing Touchdowns: 4 vs. Richmond, 2007
- ASU – Single-Game Pass Attempts: 54 vs. Montana, 2009
- ASU – Career Pass Attempts: 342
- ASU – Single-Game Completions: 29 vs. South Carolina State, 2008
- ASU – Career Completions: 216
- ASU – Single-Game Passing Yards: 433 vs. South Carolina State, 2008
- ASU – Career Passing Yards: 2,885
- ASU – Single-Game Touchdown Passes: 4 vs. South Carolina State, 2008
- ASU – Career Touchdown Passes: 19
- ASU – Single-Game Total Offense Attempts: 69 vs. Montana, 2009
- ASU – Career Total Offense Attempts: 564
- ASU – Single-Game Total Offense Yards: 495 vs. Richmond, 2007
- ASU – Career Total Offense Yards: 4,186
- ASU – Single-Game Touchdowns Responsible For: 7 vs. Richmond, 2007
- ASU – Career Touchdowns Responsible For: 37
- ASU – Single-Game Touchdowns Scored: 4 vs. Richmond, 2007
- ASU – Single-Game Points Scored: 24 vs. Richmond, 2007
- ASU – Postseason Wins By a Starting Quarterback: 11

===== Career =====
- ASU and Southern – Rushing Yards by a Quarterback: 4,361
- ASU – Passing Yards: 10,392
- ASU – Pass Attempts: 1,180
- ASU – Pass Completions: 768
- ASU and Southern – Completion Percentage (min. 250 comp.): .651
- ASU – Passing Efficiency: 154.2
- ASU – Touchdown Passes: 74
- ASU – Passing Yards per Game: 203.8
- ASU – 200-Yard Passing Games: 24
- ASU and Southern – Total Offense Attempts: 1,935
- ASU and Southern – Total Offense: 14,753
- ASU – Total Offense Per Game: 289.3
- ASU and Southern – Touchdowns Responsible For: 139
- ASU and Southern – 250-Yard Total Offense Games: 35
- ASU and Southern – 300-Yard Total Offense Games: 24
- ASU – 400-Yard Total Offense Games: 8
- ASU – Wins By a Starting Quarterback: 42

== Professional career ==
Pre-draft measurables
Height	Weight	Arm length	Hand span	40-yard dash	10-yard split	20-yard split	20-yard shuttle	Three-cone drill	Vertical jump	Broad jump	Bench press
5 ft 10 7/8 in (1.80 m)	187 lb (85 kg)	32 1/4 in (0.82 m)	9 1/2 in (0.24 m)	4.41 s	1.53 s	2.50 s	4.19 s	6.74 s	34.5 in (0.88 m)	10 ft 3 in (3.12 m)	13 reps
All values from NFL Combine/Pro Day

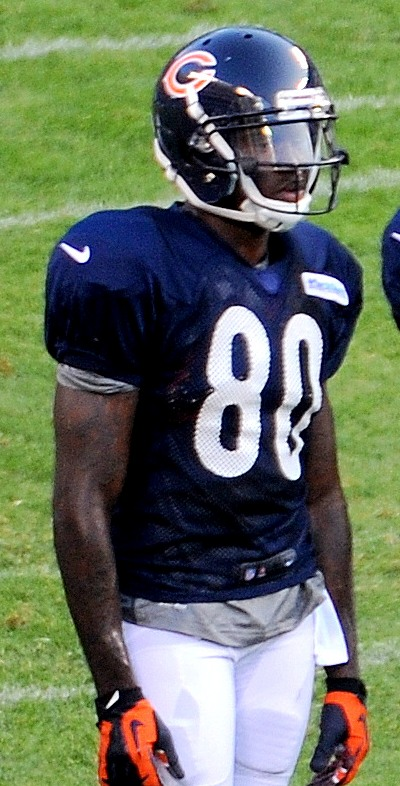
Edwards at Bears training camp in 2014.

=== Carolina Panthers ===
Edwards was selected in the third round, pick #89, of the 2010 draft by the Carolina Panthers. It was reported that Edwards could see the field at a variety of positions including wide receiver, kickoff returner, and quarterback in the wildcat formation. He was first activated in the 2010 season for the October 10 game against the Chicago Bears. After a 34–3 loss against New Orleans and the loss of Matt Moore to the injured reserve list, Coach John Fox hinted that Edwards would see more snaps at quarterback in practice. Edwards was named the emergency/third quarterback for the first time before the November 14 game at Tampa Bay, behind new starter Jimmy Clausen and backup Tony Pike. Like Moore the week before, Clausen also suffered an injury. For the team's next game on November 21 against Baltimore, Edwards was again listed as the third-string quarterback; this time behind new starter Brian St. Pierre and backup Tony Pike. On December 12, Edwards featured at quarterback for one snap against the Atlanta Falcons completing a pass to fellow rookie David Gettis for no gain.

Edwards mostly played wide receiver, kick returner, and punt returner during his time with the Panthers. He was released on October 8, 2013.

=== Cleveland Browns ===
The Cleveland Browns signed Edwards on October 31, 2013. He was placed on the team's injured reserve on November 20. On December 23, Edwards was released by the team with an injury settlement.

=== Chicago Bears ===
Edwards signed with the Chicago Bears on June 3, 2014. He was released by the team during final cuts on August 29, 2014.

=== Saskatchewan Roughriders ===
On February 24, 2016, it was announced that Edwards had signed with the Saskatchewan Roughriders of the Canadian Football League.

=== Toronto Argonauts ===
On May 27, 2017, Edwards was traded from the Roughriders to the Toronto Argonauts in exchange for offensive lineman, Peter Dyakowski. Edwards had a breakout season in 2017 for the Argos, playing in all but one regular season game, catching 83 passes for 962 yards with four touchdowns. In the playoffs he caught seven passes for 56 yards en route to winning the 105th Grey Cup. In January 2018 Edwards and the Argos agreed to a new two-year contract. Edwards finished 2018 with a similar statistical line as 2017, with 4 receiving touchdowns and coming up just shy of 1,000 yards; however, the Argos went from first to worst, following up their 2017 championship with a league worst 4–14 record for 2018. 2019 saw the Argonauts with the same record, but Edwards eclipsed the 1,000 mark for the first time, and caught seven touchdowns. He became a free agent once his contract expired on February 11, 2020.

=== XFL ===
Edwards signed with the XFL's Team 9 practice squad on February 19, 2020. He was signed off of Team 9 by the Dallas Renegades on February 25, 2020. He had his contract terminated when the league suspended operations on April 10, 2020.

=== Edmonton Eskimos / Elks ===
On April 10, 2020, it was announced that Edwards had signed with the Edmonton Eskimos. He played in six games for the renamed Edmonton Elks in 2021 and was released on December 28, 2021.

== Professional statistics ==
=== NFL ===
Year	Team	GP	GS	Passing									Receiving					Rushing					Kickoff returns					Punt returns				
Year	Team	GP	GS	Comp	Att	Pct	Yds	Avg	TD	Int	Sck	Rate	Rec	Yds	Avg	Lng	TD	Att	Yds	Avg	Lng	TD	Ret	Yds	Avg	Lng	TD	Ret	RetY	Avg	Lng	TD
2010	CAR	3	0	1	1	100	0	0	0	0	0	79.6	–	–	–	–	–	1	7	7.0	7	0	–	–	–	–	–	2	0	0	0	0
2011	CAR	16	0	1	1	100	11	11	0	0	0	112.5	–	–	–	–	–	1	5	5.0	5	0	3	35	11.7	17	0	32	176	5.5	17	0
2012	CAR	16	0	0	1	0	0	0	0	0	0	39.6	5	121	24.2	82	0	–	–	–	–	–	12	260	21.7	35	0	2	77	38.5	69	0
2013	CAR	4	0	–	–	–	–	–	–	–	–	–	0	0	–	–	0	–	–	–	–	–	–	–	–	–	–	–	–	–	–	–
2013	CLE	2	0	–	–	–	–	–	–	–	–	–	1	10	10.0	10	0	1	0	0	0	0	–	–	–	–	–	4	28	7.0	12	0
Total		41	0	2	3	66.7	11	3.7	0	0	0	72.9	6	131	21.8	82	0	3	12	4.0	7	0	15	295	19.7	35	0	40	281	7.0	69	0

=== CFL ===
Regular season:

			Receiving					Punt return					Rushing				
Year	Team	G	Rec	Yds	Avg	Lng	TD	Ret	Yds	Avg	Lng	TD	Car	Yds	Avg	Lng	TD
2016	SSK	4	19	231	12.2	46	1	7	56	8.0	12	0	2	11	5.5	6	1
2017	TOR	17	83	962	11.6	44	4	12	66	5.5	11	0	0	0	0	0	0
2018	TOR	18	73	974	13.3	69	4	4	32	8.0	12	0	4	31	7.8	19	0
2019	TOR	17	69	1,014	14.7	55	7	1	10	10.0	10	0	2	12	6.0	8	0
2021	EDM	7	16	157	9.8	45	0	0	0	0	0	0	0	0	0	0	0
Totals:		60	260	3,338	13.8	69	16	24	164	6.8	12	0	8	54	6.8	19	1
