= Battle for the Old Mountain Jug =

Dormant American college football rivalry

Appalachian State–Western Carolina football rivalry
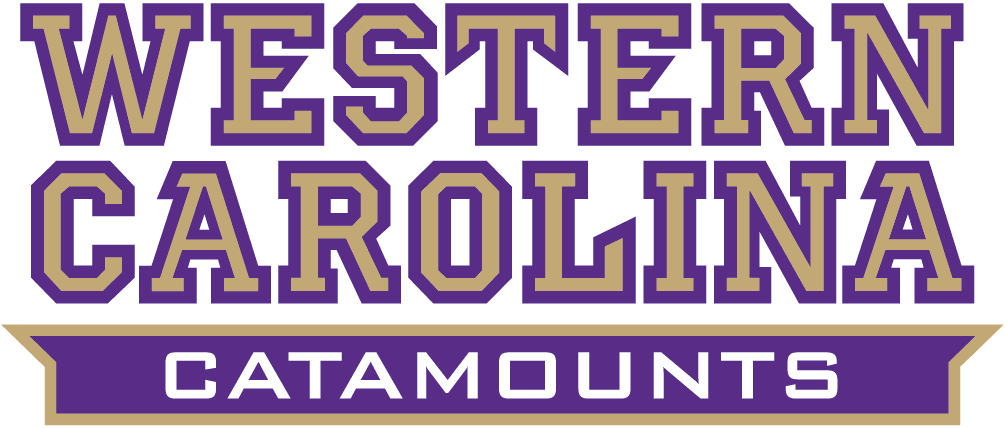
- Appalachian State Mountaineers Western Carolina Catamounts
- Sport: Football
- First meeting: November 5, 1932; Appalachian State, 20–0
- Latest meeting: November 23, 2013; Appalachian State, 48–27
- Next meeting: September 2, 2028
- Trophy: Old Mountain Jug

Statistics
- Total meetings: 78
- All-time series: Appalachian State leads, 58–19–1
- Largest victory: Appalachian State, 54–7 (1939)
- Longest win streak: Appalachian State, 13 (1932–1948) & (1985–1997)
- Current win streak: Appalachian State, 9 (2005–present)

Locations in North Carolina

The Battle for the Old Mountain Jug is the name given to the Appalachian State–Western Carolina football rivalry, an American college football rivalry game that became dormant when Appalachian State left the Southern Conference and moved to the FBS in 2014. The rivalry will be renewed during the 2028 season.

== History ==
The Mountaineers and Catamounts first played each other in a football game in 1932. The two teams then played annually without interruption from 1946 to 2013. The trophy series began in 1976.

The Old Mountain Jug, an old moonshine jug, has been awarded to the winner since 1976. It is painted gold with Appalachian State's mascot, a Mountaineer, and Western Carolina's mascot, a Catamount, on opposing sides.

The rivalry had natural origins. Appalachian and Western were the only public colleges in the western half of North Carolina for decades and made similar steps to their present status as comprehensive regional universities. Both basically recruited athletes from the same high schools in the early years and their graduates were, in large part, public school teachers. The alumni of the schools found themselves working together, which helped foster the rivalry.

Prior to the game in 1976, the idea was pitched of heightening the long-standing rivalry. The jug idea was presented to alumni of both universities and the Sports Information Directors were charged with drumming up media exposure. The jug was donated by Roby Triplett, the manager of the Appalachian State Bookstore. It weighs approximately 25 pounds and is capped with its original traditional cork. Dee Triplett, Roby's wife, painted the jug. Excluding minor touchups, the jug and its logos have not been altered since their creation.

In the mid-1980s, the series was mentioned as "the best football rivalry you've never heard of" by Sports Illustrated; but after 1985, the series became one-sided, with Western Carolina winning only 2 of the last 28 meetings. The 1979 game was the second-ever live broadcast on the ESPN sports network.

With Appalachian's move to the Sun Belt Conference of the Football Bowl Subdivision in 2014, the trophy was retired after 2013's contest. The Old Mountain Jug currently resides in a trophy case at Appalachian State.

It was Announced on May 2, 2025 that the rivalry would be renewed on September 2, 2028, with Appalachian State playing host to Western Carolina.

== Game results ==
The Appalachian State and Western Carolina rivalry dates back to 1932 with the Appalachian State Mountaineers holding a 59–18–1 advantage over the Western Carolina Catamounts. The two teams had squared off for 68 consecutive years since the game was suspended for World War II, 1942–1945.

Appalachian State victories	Western Carolina victories	Tie games

No.	Date	Location	Winner	Score
1	November 5, 1932	Boone, NC	Appalachian State	20–0
2	October 13, 1933	Cullowhee, NC	Appalachian State	15–0
3	October 12, 1934	Boone, NC	Appalachian State	6–0
4	October 26, 1935	Cullowhee, NC	Appalachian State	12–0
5	October 17, 1936	Boone, NC	Appalachian State	20–2
6	November 6, 1937	Cullowhee, NC	Appalachian State	14–0
7	October 29, 1938	Boone, NC	Appalachian State	27–0
8	October 6, 1939	Cullowhee, NC	Appalachian State	54–7
9	October 11, 1940	Boone, NC	Appalachian State	40–8
10	October 11, 1941	Cullowhee, NC	Appalachian State	35–0
11	November 9, 1946	Cullowhee, NC	Appalachian State	42–6
12	November 1, 1947	Boone, NC	Appalachian State	20–0
13	September 25, 1948	Asheville, NC	Appalachian State	14–13
14	September 24, 1949	Boone, NC	Western Carolina	13–6
15	September 16, 1950	Cullowhee, NC	Appalachian State	13–6
16	September 22, 1951	Boone, NC	Appalachian State	26–6
17	September 21, 1952	Asheville, NC	Appalachian State	20–12
18	September 27, 1953	Boone, NC	Appalachian State	7–0
19	September 19, 1954	Cullowhee, NC	Appalachian State	27–7
20	September 14, 1955	Boone, NC	Western Carolina	7–6
21	September 15, 1956	Asheville, NC	Appalachian State	19–7
22	September 24, 1957	Boone, NC	Appalachian State	25–0
23	September 25, 1958	Cullowhee, NC	Western Carolina	32–22
24	September 26, 1959	Boone, NC	Appalachian State	14–12
25	September 24, 1960	Cullowhee, NC	Western Carolina	6–2
26	September 23, 1961	Asheville, NC	Appalachian State	25–12
27	September 22, 1962	Asheville, NC	Tie	6–6
28	September 28, 1963	Boone, NC	Appalachian State	14–3
29	September 26, 1964	Cullowhee, NC	Appalachian State	27–10
30	September 25, 1965	Boone, NC	Western Carolina	7–0
31	September 24, 1966	Cullowhee, NC	Appalachian State	35–33
32	September 23, 1967	Boone, NC	Western Carolina	21–0
33	September 28, 1968	Cullowhee, NC	Appalachian State	28–14
34	September 27, 1969	Boone, NC	Western Carolina	35–7
35	September 26, 1970	Cullowhee, NC	Appalachian State	17–10
36	September 25, 1971	Boone, NC	Western Carolina	26–0
37	November 18, 1972	Cullowhee, NC	Western Carolina	35–21
38	September 22, 1973	Cullowhee, NC	Western Carolina	23–14
39	September 28, 1974	Boone, NC	Western Carolina	21–17
40	November 15, 1975	Cullowhee, NC	Western Carolina	20–11

No.	Date	Location	Winner	Score
41	October 2, 1976	Boone, NC	Appalachian State	24–17
42	November 19, 1977	Cullowhee, NC	Western Carolina	44–14
43	November 18, 1978	Cullowhee, NC	Appalachian State	39–13
44	September 22, 1979	Boone, NC	Appalachian State	35–27
45	November 1, 1980	Boone, NC	Appalachian State	27–24
46	November 21, 1981	Cullowhee, NC	Western Carolina	21–10
47	November 20, 1982	Boone, NC	Western Carolina	26–24
48	November 19, 1983	Cullowhee, NC	Western Carolina	41–15
49	October 6, 1984	Boone, NC	Western Carolina	34–7
50	November 9, 1985	Cullowhee, NC	Appalachian State	27–14
51	August 30, 1986	Boone, NC	Appalachian State	17–13
52	November 21, 1987	Cullowhee, NC	Appalachian State	33–13
53	November 5, 1988	Boone, NC	Appalachian State	42–21
54	November 18, 1989	Cullowhee, NC	Appalachian State	31–20
55	October 20, 1990	Boone, NC	Appalachian State	27–9
56	November 16, 1991	Cullowhee, NC	Appalachian State	24–14
57	November 21, 1992	Boone, NC	Appalachian State	14–12
58	November 13, 1993	Boone, NC	Appalachian State	20–16
59	November 12, 1994	Cullowhee, NC	Appalachian State	12–7
60	November 11, 1995	Boone, NC	Appalachian State	28–3
61	November 16, 1996	Cullowhee, NC	Appalachian State	24–17
62	November 15, 1997	Boone, NC	Appalachian State	13–7
63	November 21, 1998	Cullowhee, NC	Western Carolina	23–6
64	November 13, 1999	Boone, NC	Appalachian State	34–10
65	November 11, 2000	Cullowhee, NC	Appalachian State	35–28
66	November 10, 2001	Boone, NC	Appalachian State	34–24
67	November 16, 2002	Cullowhee, NC	Appalachian State	24–14
68	November 15, 2003	Boone, NC	Appalachian State	26–18
69	November 13, 2004	Cullowhee, NC	Western Carolina	30–27
70	November 12, 2005	Boone, NC	Appalachian State	35–7
71	November 11, 2006	Cullowhee, NC	Appalachian State	31–9
72	November 10, 2007	Boone, NC	Appalachian State	79–35
73	November 22, 2008	Cullowhee, NC	Appalachian State	35–10
74	November 21, 2009	Boone, NC	Appalachian State	19–14
75	October 23, 2010	Cullowhee, NC	Appalachian State	37–14
76	November 12, 2011	Boone, NC	Appalachian State	46–14
77	October 27, 2012	Cullowhee, NC	Appalachian State	38–27
78	November 23, 2013	Boone, NC	Appalachian State	48–27
Series: Appalachian State leads 58–19–1

== See also ==
- List of NCAA college football rivalry games
