= Winford W. Barrow =

Rear admiral in U.S. Coast Guard

Winford W. Barrow was a rear admiral in the United States Coast Guard.

== Biography ==
Winford Welborn Barrow was born on January 6, 1923, in Schoolfield, North Carolina and graduated from Reidsville High School in Reidsville, North Carolina in 1939. He attended what is now North Carolina State University, where he was president of his freshman class and was a member of the football, track and wrestling teams.

In 1945, Barrow married his high school sweetheart Elizabeth Perkins. The couple would have three daughters.

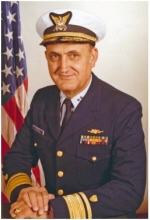
Rear Admiral Winford W. Barrow

== Career ==
In 1945, Winford W. Barrow graduated from the United States Coast Guard Academy. He was selected as vice president of his class and played on the Coast Guard Bears football team.

Shortly after graduating, Barrow was stationed aboard the United States Navy vessel USS Poole to serve as part of the Occupation of Japan after World War II. After returning to the United States, he was assigned to USCGC Bibb and USCGC Cherokee.

Barrow went on to serve as executive officer of USCGC Mistletoe and USCGC Spencer and gunnery officer of USCGC Winnebago. Eventually, he became the commanding officer of USCGC Duane after having also been its executive officer.

Transferred next to Florida, he served first as marine inspector at the Marine Inspection Office at Jacksonville from May, 1957 to June, 1959, and then as executive officer and material senior inspector at the Marine Inspection Office at Tampa until May, 1963.

During his next tour of duty, he served first as executive officer and then as commanding officer of USCGC Duane out of Boston on ocean station patrol and search and rescue. Reporting from sea duty at Coast Guard Headquarters in Washington, D.C., in August, 1965, he served first as assistant chief, for two years, and then as chief of Merchant Vessel Inspection Division for more than three years. For outstanding achievement as chief of the division, he was awarded the Coast Guard Commendation Medal. He was cited for his work in passenger ship fire safety development.

From February 1971 to July 1972, he was stationed again at Baltimore, Maryland., but in the triple role of Coast Guard group commander, commanding officer of the Coast Guard station and as captain of the Port of Baltimore.

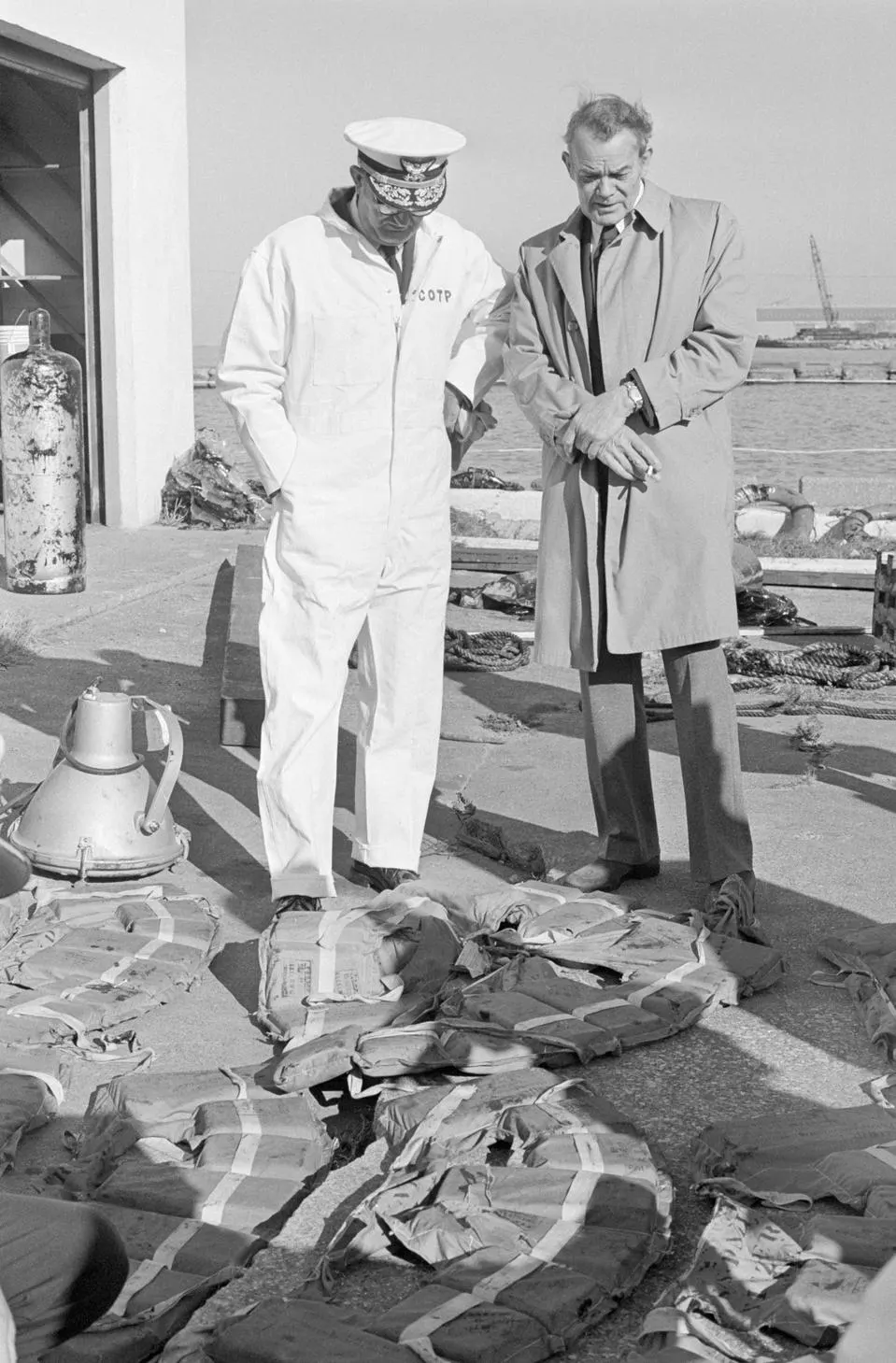
Admiral Barrow and Captain Jacobson reviewing debris from Edmund Fitzgerald

After a tour of duty as chief of the Operations Division of the Fifth Coast Guard District, he became the commanding officer of the Eighth Coast Guard District in 1974.

In 1975, Admiral Barrow served as the chair for a Coast Guard Marine Board of Investigation for the S.S. Edmund Fitzgerald, which was convened in Cleveland, Ohio, to examine the facts surrounding this casualty and to make recommendations to prevent the recurrence of similar casualties.

Barrow retired from the military in 1978. Decorations he received during his career included the Coast Guard Commendation Medal, the World War II Victory Medal, the American Campaign Medal, the Asiatic-Pacific Campaign Medal, the Navy Occupation Service Medal and the National Defense Service Medal.
