= USCGC Violet (WAGL-250) =

US Coast Guard Buoy Tender

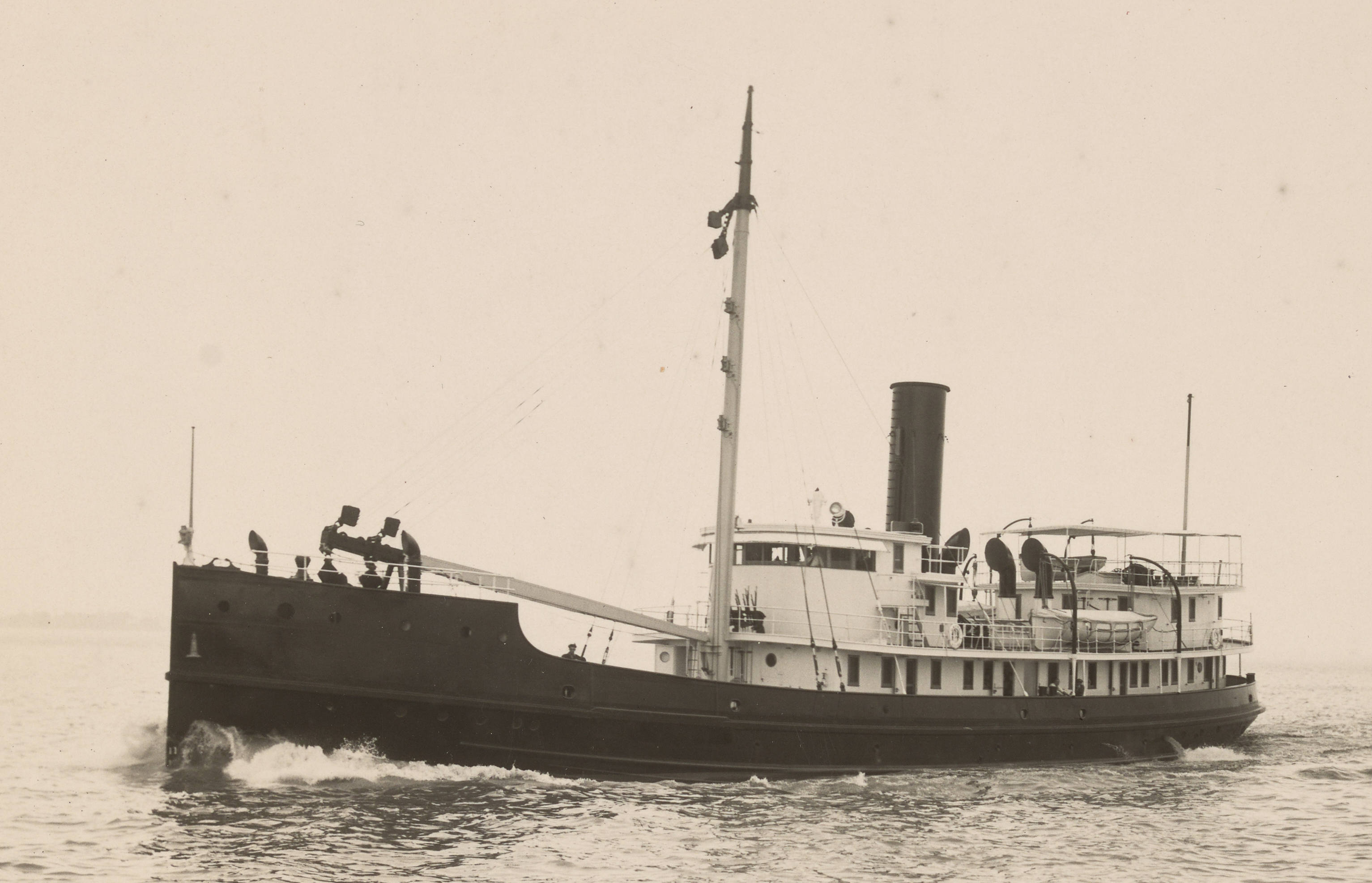
- USLHT Violet

History

United States
- Name: USCGC Violet (WAGL-250)
- Operator: US Lighthouse Service (1933-1939); US Coast Guard (1939-1962)
- Builder: Manitowoc Shipbuilding Company
- Cost: $337,840
- Launched: April 12, 1930
- Commissioned: August 21, 1930
- Decommissioned: January 2, 1962
- Identification: Signal letters: WWAD
- Fate: Sold and scrapped 1963

General characteristics
- Displacement: 1,012 tons, fully loaded
- Length: 173 ft 4 in (52.83 m)
- Beam: 32 ft (9.8 m)
- Draft: 10.5 ft (3.2 m)
- Installed power: 2 triple-expansion steam engines; 1,000 shp (750 kW)
- Propulsion: Twin propellers
- Speed: 11.5 knots (21.3 km/h; 13.2 mph) maximum
- Complement: 30 in 1931

USCGC Violet (WAGL-250) was a United States Coast Guard buoy tender. She was built in 1930 by the Manitowoc Shipbuilding Company in Manitowoc, Wisconsin for the United States Lighthouse Service. She spent her entire working career in Chesapeake Bay and surrounding waters. She became part of the United States Coast Guard when the Lighthouse Service was abolished in 1939, and was placed under the orders of the U.S. Navy during World War II. Her primary missions included maintaining lighthouses, buoys, and other aids to navigation, and search and rescue. She was decommissioned in 1962 and sold for scrap.

== Construction and characteristics ==
Violet was the first of three tenders built to the same design. USLHT Lilac was the second ship in the class, launched in 1933, and USLHT Mistletoe was the last, launched in 1938.

Violet was built by the Manitowoc Shipbuilding Company of Manitowoc, Wisconsin. The contract for her construction was signed on September 6, 1929. She was launched on April 12, 1930. Violet was christened by Dorothy Mae Wallace, daughter of the shipyard's general manager, W. L. Wallace. Her original cost was the $337,840.

Violet was delivered to the Lighthouse Service on August 21, 1930. She left Manitowoc on August 27, 1930, under tow from USLHT Hyacinth. Violet was towed to the Lighthouse Service depot in Milwaukee for her final outfitting and provisioning, and was joined by her crew there.

Violet's hull was built of steel plates, riveted together. She was 173 feet 4 inches (52.83 m) long overall, with a beam of 32 feet (9.8 m), a fully loaded draft of 10.5 feet (3.2 m), and a depth of hold of 13 feet (4.0 m). Fully loaded, she displaced 1,012 tons.

Her pilothouse, chartroom, and captain's quarters were placed forward, above the main deck house. Quarters for the officers and men were in the main deck house and the deck below.

The ship was propelled by two vertical inverted triple-expansion steam engines, each of which produced 500 horsepower. These engines had high, medium, and low pressure cylinders of 11.5 inches, 19 inches, and 32 inches in diameter, and a stroke of 24 inches. These drove two four-bladed propellers which were 7.5 feet (2.3 m) in diameter. Steam was provided by two Babcock & Wilcox oil-fired boilers. This powerplant gave her a maximum speed of 11.5 knots. Cruising at 7 knots, she had an unrefueled range of 1,800 miles.

Violet was equipped with a steel mast and boom which was used as a derrick. Its hoist was steam-driven and could lift up to 20 tons. Electricity aboard was provided by a steam-driven generator which produced 110 volts. She was equipped with a radio, radio direction finder, and refrigeration.

Her crew varied in size over the years. In 1931, her first year in service, she carried 7 officers and 23 enlisted men. In 1961, Violet had a complement of 38, composed of 2 officers, 2 warrant officers, and 34 enlisted men.

United States buoy tenders are traditionally named for trees, shrubs, and flowering plants. Violet was named for the Violet, a type of flowering plant. She was the second lighthouse tender named Violet, the first Violet having been purchased by the Lighthouse Service in 1870 and retired in 1910.

== U.S. Government service (1930–1962) ==
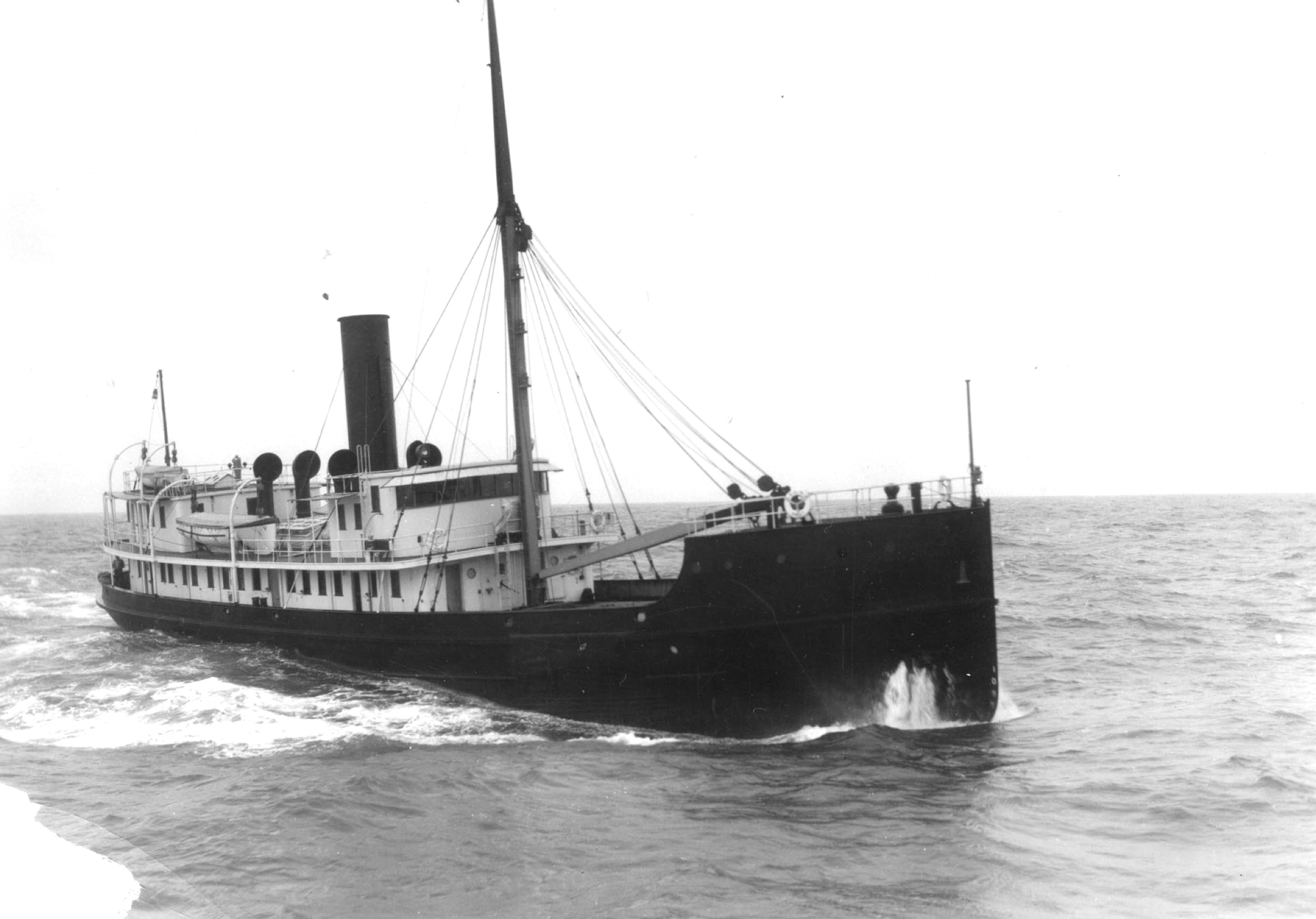
USLHT Violet

=== U.S. Lighthouse Service (1930–1939) ===
When launched in 1930, Violet sailed in the fleet of the U.S. Lighthouse Service, a bureau of the U.S. Department of Commerce. Violet was assigned to the 5th Lighthouse District, and worked primarily in upper Chesapeake Bay and its tributaries, including the Potomac River. She replaced USLHT Holly, which was decommissioned and sold. She sailed from Wisconsin, where she was built, through the Great Lakes and the Saint Lawrence River, finally reaching her new base at the Lazaretto Point Lighthouse Depot at Baltimore, Maryland on October 10, 1930. She made port calls along the way at Halifax, Boston, and Norfolk. The crew of USLHT Maple was transferred to Violet on her arrival at Norfolk.

Violet maintained the lighthouses in the upper Chesapeake Bay. She installed new fog signals at the Bloody Point Bar Light in 1931 and the Sandy Point Shoal Light in 1932. She towed a maintenance barge to the Turkey Point Light for repairs on the keeper's quarters. Violet carried supplies and personnel to the lighthouses in her area.

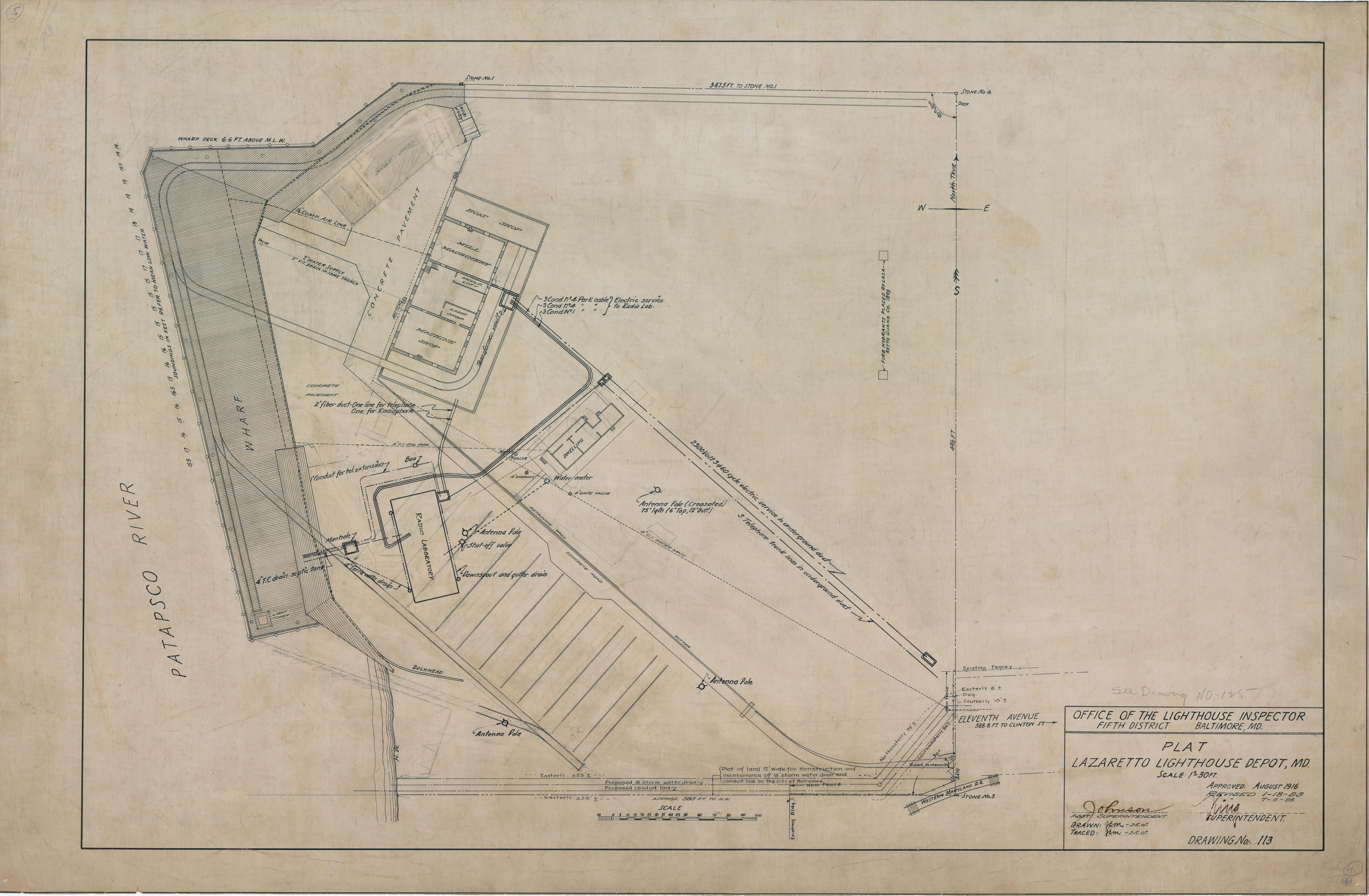
Lazaretto Point Lighthouse Depot, Violet's base

The ship also maintained the buoys in her area. The fresh water of the upper Chesapeake Bay and its tributary rivers froze in the winter, and ice floes would damage buoys. To prevent this damage,Violet was required to remove the buoys in the winter and replace them in the spring. Her work in the ice was difficult. During the winter of 1935–1936, all four blades of her starboard propeller were broken off by ice. She refueled and relit the lighted buoys in her area, which prior to electrification produced their light by burning gas or acetylene. Violet was occasionally dispatched to assist in maintaining aids to navigation outside of it normal operating area. For instance, in November 1933 she helped repair storm damage on the North Carolina coast.

There were a number of notable incidents during Violet's service with the Lighthouse Service. On September 6, 1935, she rescued ten sailors from the tug Fanny May which sank off the mouth of the Rappahannok River during a gale. In November 1935, Violet towed the disabled oyster boat Eva Bell safely back to port. On October 23, 1938, she hosted a one-day inspection tour for Secretary of Commerce Daniel C. Roper, to whom the Lighthouse Service reported. Accompanying the secretary were Harold D. King, Commissioner of Lighthouses, and James M. Johnson, Assistant Secretary of Commerce. Violet and her crew demonstrated replacing buoys, and stopped to visit the Sandy Point Shoal Light.

=== U.S. Coast Guard (1939–1962) ===
The U.S. Lighthouse Service was merged into the United States Coast Guard on 1 July 1939. Violet remained stationed in Baltimore, her area now the responsibility of the 5th Coast Guard District. She was classified as an "auxiliary vessel, lighthouse tender" and given the pennant number WAGL-250. Beyond the pennant number on her bow, there were other minor changes in her appearance, including the removal of the brass lighthouse insignia on her bow, and painting the lower portion of her stack tan.

The personnel aboard Violet were also affected by the move into the Coast Guard. There were several issues with rank, culture, and work conditions as the crew converted from civil service regulations to military discipline. Captain John M. Kendley, who became Violet's first permanent master in 1930, was given the rank of chief boatswain in the Coast Guard. He chose to retire from command of Violet in 1941.

On December 9, 1939 Violet was moored at the Lazaretto Point lighthouse Depot when she was rammed by the freighter Hollywood of the McCormick Steamship Company. Hollywood's steering system had failed, possibly due to malicious tampering. Two of Violet's crewmen were injured. An oil tank was split open and flooded Violet's hold. The impact drove Violet into her wharf which then partial collapsed onto her deck. Repairs were made at the Maryland Drydock Company, and Violet was back at work in February 1940.

==== World War II ====
On 1 November 1941 President Roosevelt issued Executive Order 8929 transferring the U.S. Coast Guard from Treasury Department to United States Navy control. Violet remained based at Baltimore, but came under the orders of the 5th Naval District.

Violet and similar buoy tenders were equipped to play a role in coastal defense, in addition to maintaining their aids to navigation. Violet was repainted in the Navy's haze gray. A 3"/50 gun was installed on her forecastle, a pair of 20mm/80 Oerlikon cannon aft of her wheelhouse, and two depth charge tracks on her stern. Lilac was equipped with an SO-1 surface search radar and a WEA-2 sonar. There is no record of her engaging in combat and all of her deck armament was removed by the end of 1945.

==== Post War ====
On 28 December 1945 President Truman issued Executive Order 9666 canceling Executive Order 8929 and returning the Coast Guard to Treasury Department control. After the war, Violet continued to maintain the lighthouses and buoys in the Chesapeake Bay, but this work was significantly altered by technology. Some buoys were electrified, which reduced fuel deliveries, and some lighthouses were automated, which reduced but did not eliminate personnel and supply missions.

Violet participated in a number of search and rescue missions during this phase of her Coast Guard career. Her icebreaking capabilities were used to free the Canadian steamer Observer, which had been iced-in near Cove Point in February 1948. She also towed small tankers through ice to keep coastal communities supplied with fuel oil. On October 5, 1948, she rescued two crew of the tug Arundel which sank near Seven Foot Knoll during a storm. Later than month she was dispatched to search for the crew of the trawler Benjamin Colonna which sank near Hoppers Island. In April 1955, Violet towed the disabled motor vessel Jeffries to port.

In September 1954 Violet used its derrick to recover a sunken U.S. Navy twin-engined Beechcraft JRB-4 which crashed in the Patapsco River after a mid-air collision. Her 20-ton crane was also used to salvage a Coast Guard patrol boat at Annapolis, where it had sunk at its moorings in November 1960.

Public tours of Violet were offered on Coast Guard Day in 1948.

=== Obsolescence and disposal ===
Violet was decommissioned on January 2, 1962. On March 8, 1963, she was sold to the North American Marine Salvage Company. Violet was scrapped at the company's Fieldsboro, New Jersey shipyard.
