= Rockingham County Schools =

School district in North Carolina, United States

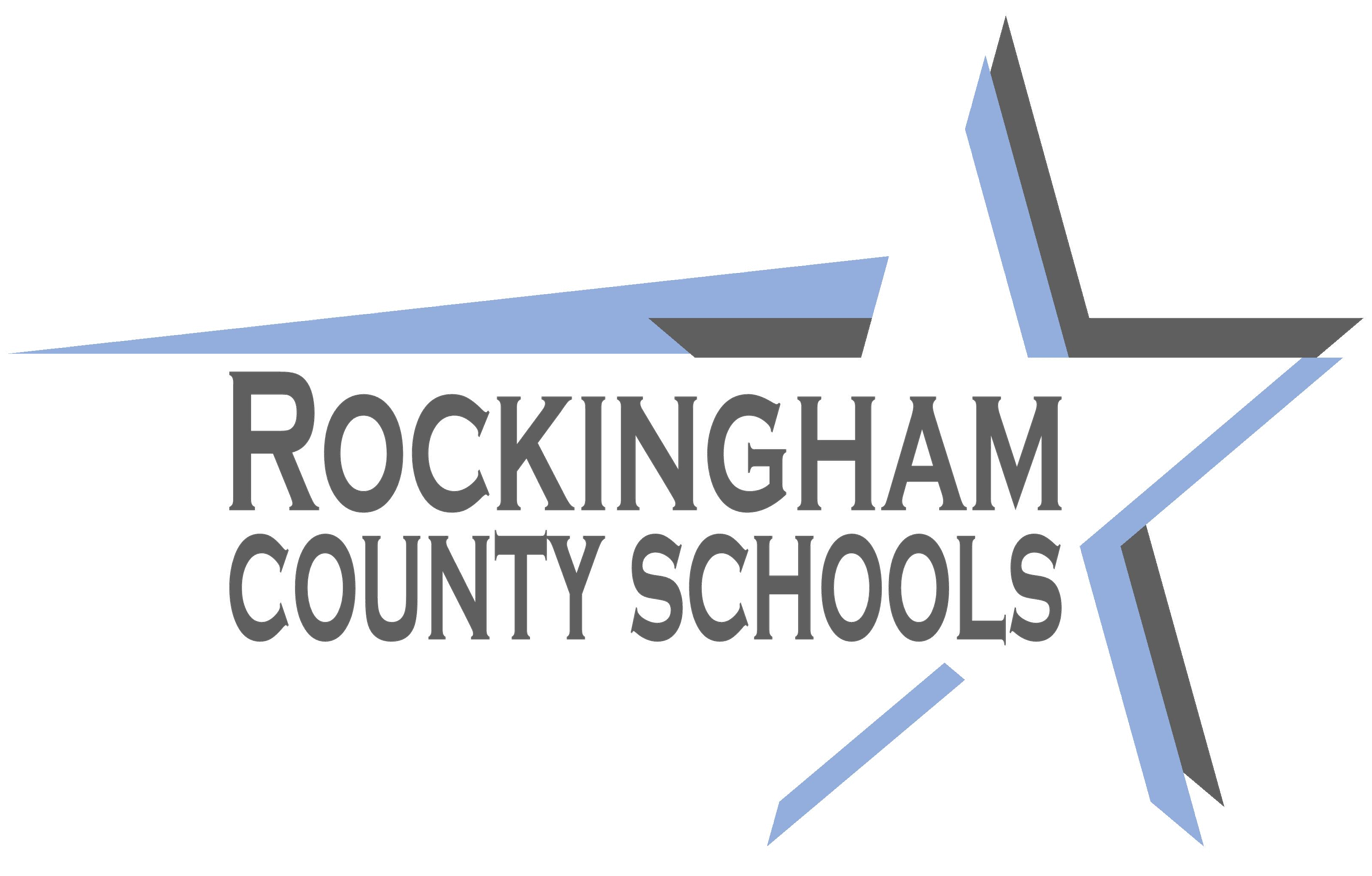
- Rockingham Count Schools District Logo

District information
- Motto: The CHOICE that ROCKS!
- Grades: PreK-13
- Established: 1993
- Superintendent: Charles Perkins
- Schools: 25
- Budget: $120,064,583

Students and staff
- Staff: 2,000

Other information
- Website: www.rock.k12.nc.us

Rockingham County Schools is a public school district in Rockingham County in the U.S. state of North Carolina. Dr. Charles Perkins is the superintendent.

== School board ==
Member	District
Kimberly McMichael (Board Chair)	At-Large
Philip Butler (Vice-Chair)	At-Large
Vicky Alston	District 1
Paula Rakestraw	At-Large
Paul Moore	District 3
Daniel Rakes	District 2
Bob Wyatt	District 4

== Schools ==
=== Elementary schools ===
School name	Town
Bethany Elementary School	Bethany, NC
Central Elementary School	Wentworth, NC
Dillard Academy	Madison, NC*
Douglass Elementary School	
Huntsville Elementary School	Huntsville, NC
Leaksville-Spray Elementary School	Eden, NC
Lincoln Elementary School	Ruffin, NC
Monroeton Elementary School	
Moss Street Partnership School	Reidsville, NC
South End Elementary School	
Stoneville Elementary School	Stoneville, NC
Wentworth Elementary School	Wentworth, NC
Williamsburg Elementary School	

=== Middle schools ===
Middle schools in Rockingham County Schools
Information	James E. Holmes	Reidsville	Rockingham County	Western Rockingham Middle School
Location	Eden	Reidsville	Reidsville	Madison
Year opened	1967 (Note: In 1967, the previously existing Leaksville-Spray and Draper junior highs were consolidated; in 1991, the school shifted from serving 7th-9th grades to 6th-8th grades and became a middle school)		1999	1991 (Note: Before 1989, Madison-Mayodan and Stoneville middle schools served the same area; in 1989, the middle and high schools there were consolidated, and when Dalton L. McMichael HS moved to its new facilities in 1991, Western Rockingham MS moved to the old Madison-Mayodan HS site)
School colors	Burgundy, gray, white	Green/gold	Black/gray	Navy blue/gold
School mascot	Mustang	Raider	Jaguar	Wildcat
Feeds into...	J.M. Morehead HS	Reidsville HS	Rockingham County HS	Dalton L. McMichael HS

=== High schools ===
School name
Dalton L. McMichael High School
John Motley Morehead High School
Reidsville High School
Rockingham County High School
Rockingham Early College High School
Rockingham County CTE Innovative High School

=== Others ===
School name
The S.C.O.R.E. Center (K-12 alternative school to assist at-risk students with transitioning back into the traditional school environment)
Rockingham Community College

While not technically part of Rockingham County Schools is in the county and should be mentioned.

== Statistics ==
=== Demographics ===
(as of the 2012-2013 school year)

Ethnicity	Percentage
White	62.5%
African American	20.2%
Hispanic	11.4%
Other and multiple ethnicities	5.9%
