= Peyton Reed =

American film and television director (born 1964)

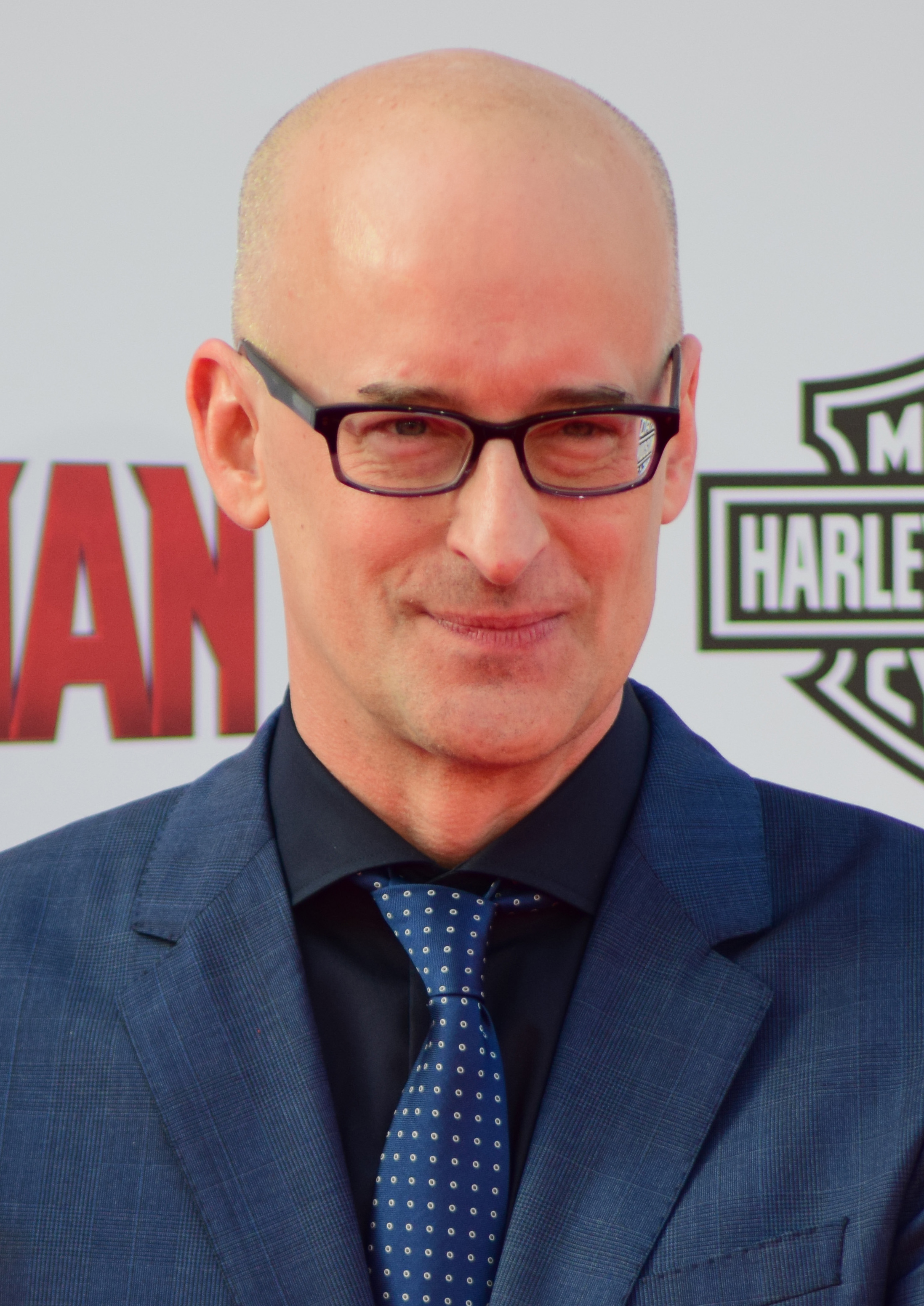
- Reed in 2015
- Born: Peyton Tucker Reed; July 3, 1964 (age 62); Raleigh, North Carolina, U.S.
- Occupations: Film director, television director, television producer
- Years active: 1987–present
- Spouses: Beth LaMure (m. 1998; div. 2006) Sheila Naghshineh (m. 2013)
- Children: 2

Peyton Tucker Reed (born July 3, 1964) is an American director of film, television, and commercials. He directed the comedy films Bring It On (2000), Down with Love (2003), The Break-Up (2006), and Yes Man (2008), as well as the superhero film Ant-Man (2015) and its sequels.

== Early life and education ==
Reed was born in Raleigh, North Carolina and attended the University of North Carolina at Chapel Hill, graduating in 1987 with a degree in English and Radio, Television & Motion Pictures. He was a DJ for WXYC, the UNC student radio station, while enrolled at the university. He worked as a van driver on the set of Bull Durham in 1987, which was partially filmed in Raleigh.

== Career ==
=== 2000–2014: Studio films ===
Reed's feature film directorial debut, Bring It On, was a number one box office hit. He also directed Down with Love, and The Break-Up; all comedy films. He has also acted in small roles in some films including his own and has written a few original songs for his soundtracks. He has also produced a few music videos. In 2000, Reed was attached to helm East Bound and Down, a reworking of Smokey and the Bandit, as his feature follow-up to Bring It On.

In 2001, Reed was set to direct the 20th Century Fox production Fantastic Four, before departing the project and being replaced by director Tim Story. Reed directed the 2008 film Yes Man, starring Jim Carrey. Yes Man is an adaptation of Danny Wallace's autobiography about his decision to say "yes" to whatever offer, invitation, challenge, or opportunity that is presented to him. In 2011, The Gregory Brothers announced that Reed was in talks to direct them in a musical television pilot for Comedy Central.

=== 2015–present: Work with the MCU ===
Reed replaced Edgar Wright as the director of Ant-Man. Prior to joining the production of Ant-Man, Reed was slated to direct a Brian Epstein biopic, based on the graphic novel The Fifth Beatle. However, his commitment to the superhero film required him to part ways with The Fifth Beatle. Reed then went on to direct Ant-Man and the Wasp, the sequel to Ant-Man. He also directed the third Ant-Man film, Ant-Man and the Wasp: Quantumania.

Reed directed two episodes from the second season of the Disney+ series The Mandalorian, part of the Star Wars franchise. Reed is reportedly directing a movie about the 1960s band the Monkees, according to Jeff Sneider.

== Personal life ==
Reed lives in the Los Angeles area with his second wife Sheila Naghshineh and their two sons. He was previously married to Beth LaMure from 1998 to 2006.

He plays in the band Cardinal Family Singers with Norwood Cheek. The band has released three albums, and their instrumental song "Tilting Scale" is featured in Ant-Man and the Wasp.

== Filmography ==
=== Film ===
Year	Title	Distributor
2000	Bring It On	Universal Pictures
2003	Down with Love	20th Century Fox
2006	The Break-Up	Universal Pictures
2008	Yes Man	Warner Bros. Pictures
2015	Ant-Man	Walt Disney Studios
2018	Ant-Man and the Wasp	Walt Disney Studios
2023	Ant-Man and the Wasp: Quantumania	Walt Disney Studios

=== Television ===
Year	Title	Director	Executive Producer	Notes
1991	Back to the Future	Yes	No	13 episodes, live-action sequences
1995	The Computer Wore Tennis Shoes	Yes	No	TV movie
1997	The Love Bug	Yes	No	TV movie
1997	The Weird Al Show	Yes	No	13 episodes
1998	Mr. Show with Bob and David	Yes	No	3 episodes
2000	Upright Citizens Brigade	Yes	No	4 episodes, 2 segments
2008	Cashmere Mafia	Yes	Yes	Episode "Pilot"
2011	New Girl	Yes	No	3 episodes
2013	The Goodwin Games	Yes	Yes	3 episodes
2019–2021	The Unicorn	No	Yes	
2020	The Mandalorian	Yes	No	Episodes "Chapter 10: The Passenger" and "Chapter 16: The Rescue"
2026	Ride or Die	Yes	Yes	2 episodes

Commercials

- "Pretty Khaki" (for GAP, February 28, 2005)

== Reception ==
Film	Rotten Tomatoes	Metacritic	CinemaScore	Budget	Box office
Bring It On	63% (117 reviews)	52 (31 reviews)	B+	$28 million	$90.4 million
Down with Love	60% (177 reviews)	52 (39 reviews)	C+	$35 million	$39.5 million
The Break-Up	34% (192 reviews)	45 (37 reviews)	C+	$52 million	$205 million
Yes Man	46% (154 reviews)	46 (30 reviews)	A−	$70 million	$223.2 million
Ant-Man	83% (330 reviews)	64 (44 reviews)	A	$130 million	$519.3 million
Ant-Man and the Wasp	87% (431 reviews)	70 (56 reviews)	A−	$162 million	$622.3 million
Ant-Man and the Wasp: Quantumania	48% (355 reviews)	48 (61 reviews)	B	$200 million	$462 million
