= USCGC Lilac =

US Coast Guard buoy tender, museum ship

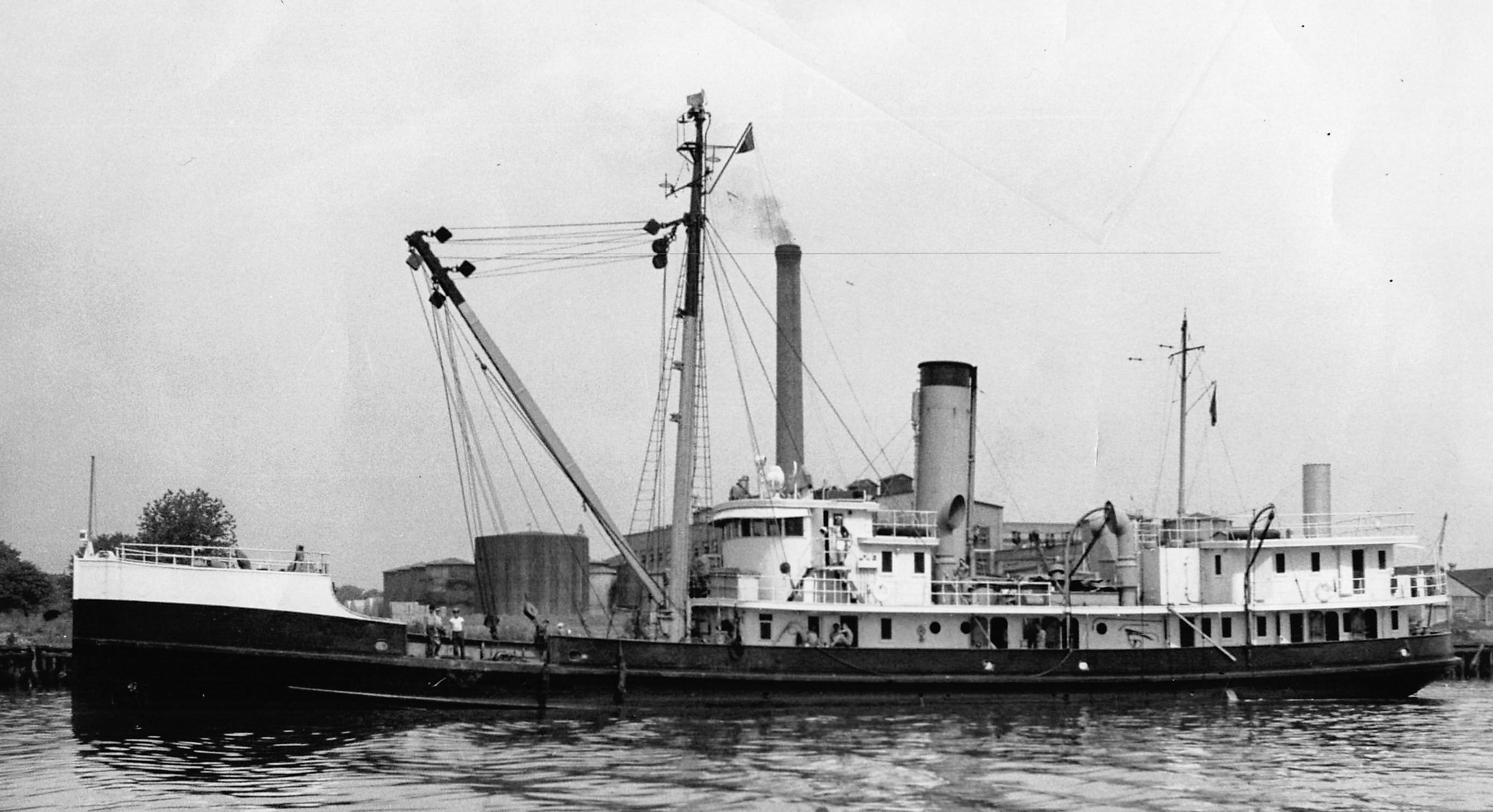
- USCGC Lilac in September 1946

History

United States
- Name: USCGC Lilac (WAGL-227)
- Operator: US Lighthouse Service (1933-1939); US Coast Guard (1939-1972)
- Ordered: 13 April 1931
- Builder: Pusey & Jones Company
- Cost: $334,900
- Launched: 26 May 1933
- Decommissioned: 3 February 1972
- Identification: Signal letters: WWHT
- Status: Museum ship

General characteristics
- Displacement: 799 tons
- Length: 173 ft 4 in (52.83 m)
- Beam: 32 ft (9.8 m)
- Draft: 11 ft (3.4 m)
- Installed power: 2 triple-expansion steam engines; 1,000 shp (750 kW)
- Propulsion: Twin propellers
- Speed: 11 knots (20 km/h; 13 mph) maximum
- Complement: 29 in 1935
- USCGC Lilac
- U.S. National Register of Historic Places
- New York State Register of Historic Places
- Location within Lower Manhattan Location within New York
- Location: Pier 25, New York, New York
- Coordinates: 40°43′58″N 74°0′46″W
- NRHP reference No.: 04001441

Significant dates
- Added to NRHP: 7 January 2005
- Designated NYSRHP: 17 September 2004

USCGC Lilac (WAGL/WLM-227) is a former Coast Guard buoy tender which is now a museum ship located in New York City. Lilac is America's only surviving steam-powered buoy tender, and is listed on the National Register of Historic Places.

Lilac was built in 1933 at the Pusey and Jones Shipyard in Wilmington, Delaware for the United States Lighthouse Service. She spent her entire working career in Delaware Bay, the Delaware River, and surrounding waters. She became part of the United States Coast Guard when the Lighthouse Service was abolished in 1939. Her primary missions with both agencies included maintaining lighthouses, buoys, and other aids to navigation, and search and rescue. She was decommissioned in 1972, the last steam-engine propelled ship in the Coast Guard fleet.

She passed through several private owners after her government service, until 2004 when she came into the possession of the Lilac Preservation Project, a non-profit organization dedicated to maintaining the historic ship.

== Contracting ==
Lilac had a difficult contracting process. Bids for two "Violet class" tenders were opened by the Lighthouse Service on 11 December 1930. Hampton Roads Shipbuilding Corporation of Portsmouth, Virginia was the low bidder at $344,975 for the first vessel, and $342,975 for the second. The second lowest bidder was Manitowoc Shipbuilding Company, which had already successfully launched USLHT Violet, the lead vessel in the class. Pusey and Jones Corporation of Wilmington, Delaware was the third lowest at $374,500 for the first, and $344,500 for the second tender.

The Lighthouse Service had reservations about Hampton Roads Shipbuilding. It was newly organized after Spear Engineers, Inc., its predecessor company, went bankrupt. The shipyard had operated for less than two years and had never built a steam-powered ship. The shipyard would need to extend its slipway to build a vessel of Lilac's size, and would need to acquire additional equipment to build a steel vessel of this type. Commissioner of Lighthouses George R. Putnam recommended accepting the Manitowoc bid. Officials at Hampton Roads Shipbuilding appealed to Putnam's superior, Secretary of Commerce Robert P. Lamont. The president of Hampton Roads Shipbuilding was Edward E. Gann, the brother-in-law of U.S. Vice-President Charles Curtis. The lobbying resulted in the rejection of Putnam's recommendation. Instead, the Lighthouse Service changed its specifications slightly and sought new proposals for a single tender.

Twelve bidders responded to the new solicitation. When bids were opened on 9 March 1931 Hampton Roads Shipbuilding was still the low bidder at $339,000. Tampa Shipbuilding and Engine Company was second at $348,000, and Pusey and Jones was third lowest again at $349,500. Hampton Roads promised to complete the ship in 390 days, Tampa Shipbuilding in 320 days, and Pusey and Jones in 225 days. Still reluctant to award the contract to the low bidder, the Secretary of Commerce sought an opinion from the Comptroller General as to whether Hampton Roads Shipbuilding was qualified to bid on the project. The Comptroller General concluded that it was qualified. On 13 April 1931 the Lighthouse Service awarded the contract to build Lilac to Hampton Roads Shipbuilding for $334,900.

By the end of August 1931 Hampton Roads Shipbuilding had extended its slipway, purchased new equipment, and laid the keel. About 100 men were working on the project. On 19 September 1931, the wooden Pennsylvania Railroad pier, and the company's offices, machine shops, warehouses, and other facilities that were built on it were destroyed in a fire. While the partially completed hull on the slipway was not damaged, drawings, blueprints, and forms for the vessel were destroyed, and the shipyard's operations were completely disrupted.

On 20 June 1932 the Commissioner of Lighthouses terminated the contract. The hull was not closed at the bow or stern, and the engines had not been installed. The ship was nowhere near complete and the 390 day delivery commitment was in default. U. S. Representative Mack Lankford, who represented the Portsmouth area in Congress, visited the Commerce Department to protest the cancellation, to no avail. Hampton Roads Shipbuilding Corporation declared bankruptcy 23 August 1932. The incomplete hull that was once destined to become Lilac was sold by the bankruptcy trustee in October 1932.

The Lighthouse Service awarded a new contract for Lilac on 16 August 1932 to Pusey and Jones. It seems likely that the Lighthouse Service's confidence in Pusey and Jones was enhanced by its decision the previous month to award it the contract for USLHT Arbutus, a near-sistership. The new contract was for $214,500 plus the materials that had already been purchased for the ship by the Lighthouse Service, including steel plating, bolts, rivets, and her boilers and engines. Pusey and Jones began building the ship from the keel up and made no use of the partially completed hull at Hampton Roads Shipbuilding.

== Construction and characteristics ==
The stern of Lilac

Lilac was the second of three tenders built to the same design. USLHT Violet was the lead ship in the class, launched in 1930, and USLHT Mistletoe was the last launched in 1938.

Pusey and Jones laid the ship's keel on 15 November 1932. Lilac was launched on 26 May 1933. She was christened by Miss Kristi Aresvik Putnam, daughter of the Commissioner of Lighthouses, George R. Putnam. In view of prohibition, a bottle of water was broken over her bow rather than the traditional champaign. Also attending the launch were Commissioner Putnam, and Assistant Secretary of Commerce Dr. John Dickinson. The wasted costs associated with the failed Hampton Roads Shipbuilding effort were made good by its surety bond, so Lilac's original cost to the Lighthouse Service was the $334,900 specified in the original contract.

Lilac's hull was built of steel plates, riveted together. She was 173 feet 4 inches (52.83 m) long overall, with a beam of 32 feet (9.8 m), a draft of 11 feet (3.4 m), and a depth of hold of 13 feet (4.0 m). Her gross register tonnage was 770. Fully loaded, she displaced 799 tons.

The ship was propelled by two triple-expansion steam engines, each of which produced 500 horsepower. The high, medium, and low pressure cylinders had diameters of 11.5, 19, and 24 inches respectively, with a stroke of 24 inches. These drove two four-bladed propellers which were 7.5 feet (2.3 m) in diameter. Steam was provided by two Babcock & Wilcox oil-fired boilers. This powerplant gave her a maximum speed of 11 knots. Her fuel tanks had a capacity of 30,000 U.S. gallons (110,000 L) which gave her a range of 1,734 nautical miles at 10 knots.

Lilac was equipped with a steel mast and boom which was used as a derrick. Its hoist was steam-driven and could lift up to 20 tons.

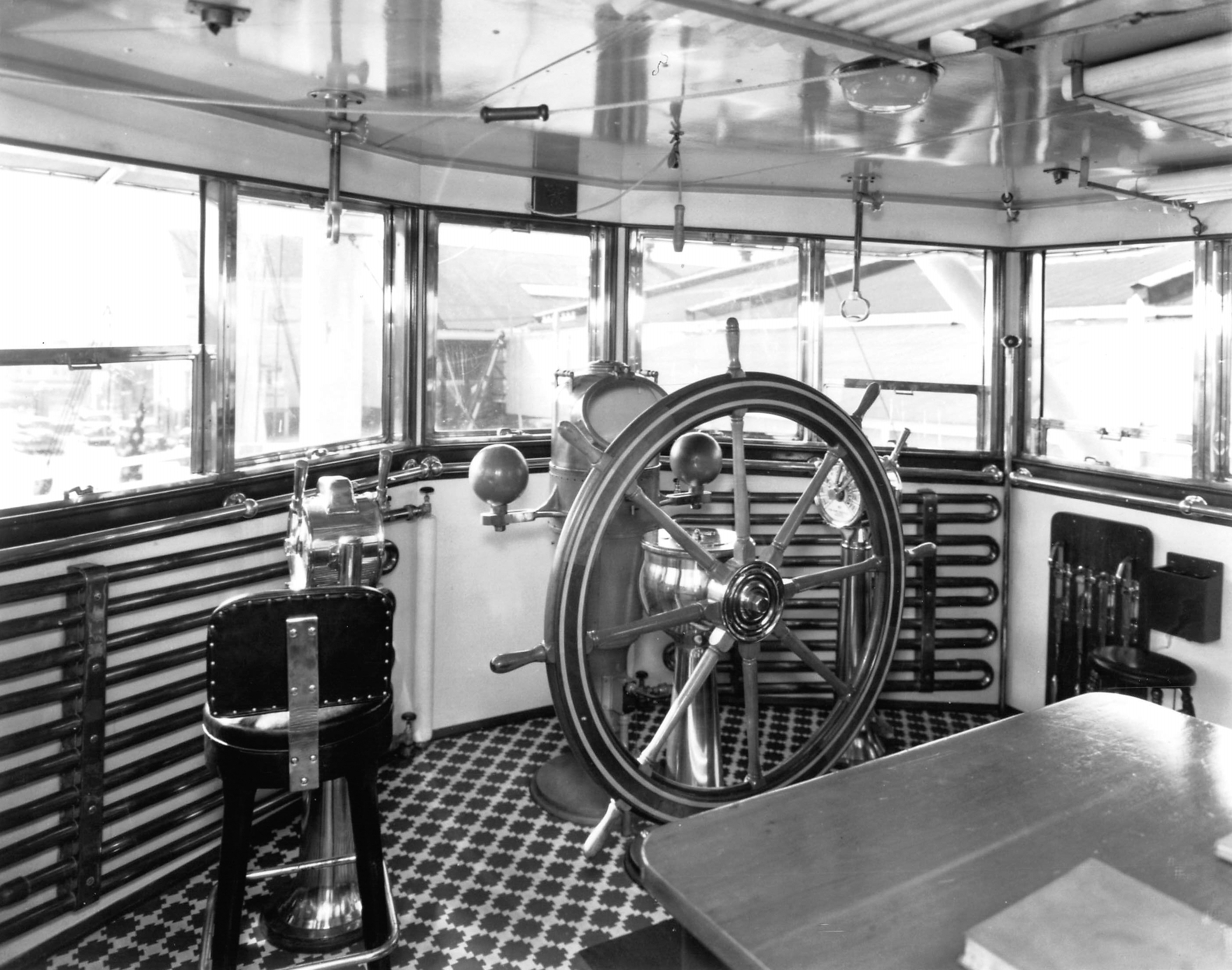
Wheelhouse of USLHT Lilac

The ship had four deck levels. The lowest deck contained the cargo hold forward, and fuel tanks, boiler room, and engine room aft. The next level also contained the hold, boiler room, and engine room, which were two decks tall. This second level also contained crew quarters forward, and petty officers quarters aft. The main deck included the open buoy-handling deck, the galley and associated pantry and refrigerated rooms, the crew mess, officers' staterooms, officers' bathroom, and officers' dining room. The boat deck, the higher level of the deckhouse, included the wheelhouse, captain's stateroom, office, and bathroom forward, and the radio room, and three more staterooms aft.

Her crew varied in size over the years. In 1935 the ship's complement was 7 officers and 22 men.

United States buoy tenders are traditionally named for trees, shrubs, and flowering plants. Lilac is named for the Lilac, a flowering shrub. She was the second lighthouse tender named Lilac, the first having been launched in 1891 and decommissioned in 1924.

== U.S. Government service (1933–1972) ==
=== U.S. Lighthouse Service (1933–1939) ===
When launched in 1933, Lilac sailed in the fleet of the U.S. Lighthouse Service, a bureau of the U.S. Department of Commerce. Lilac was assigned to the 4th Lighthouse District, which included the coast of Delaware, and adjoining portions of the New Jersey, and Virginia shores. She replaced USLHT Iris there. Lilac was based at the district's Edgemoor Depot in Delaware.

Lilac tended the buoys of the Delaware River and Delaware Bay. This included repairing and replacing buoys damaged and sunk by weather, ice, and impacts from passing ships. She placed buoys on wrecks to warn passing ships of the danger. Lilac also delivered supplies to the manned lighthouses in her area, and maintained the equipment in the lighthouses which had been automated.

=== U.S. Coast Guard (1939–1972) ===
The U.S. Lighthouse Service was merged into the United States Coast Guard on 1 July 1939. Lilac remained stationed in Delaware, her area now the responsibility of the 5th Coast Guard District. She was classified as an "auxiliary vessel, lighthouse tender" and given the pennant number WAGL-227. Beyond the pennant number on her bow, there were other minor changes in her appearance, including the removal of the brass lighthouse insignia on her bow, and painting the lower portion of her stack tan.

As the United States approached its entry into World War II, it held approximately 70 Italian, German, and Danish vessels, and their crews in its ports. U.S. Naval Intelligence learned that Italian authorities had instructed the crews to sabotage the Italian-flagged ships so they could not be used by the Americans if they were seized. The Coast Guard was ordered to seize the ships to prevent the sabotage, but 20 had already been damaged by their crews. On 30 March 1941, Lilac and her crew participated in the seizure of Mar Glouco, Santa Rosa, and Antoinetta, at Gloucester City, New Jersey, and transported 77 officers and crew of these ships to the immigration center ashore.

==== World War II ====
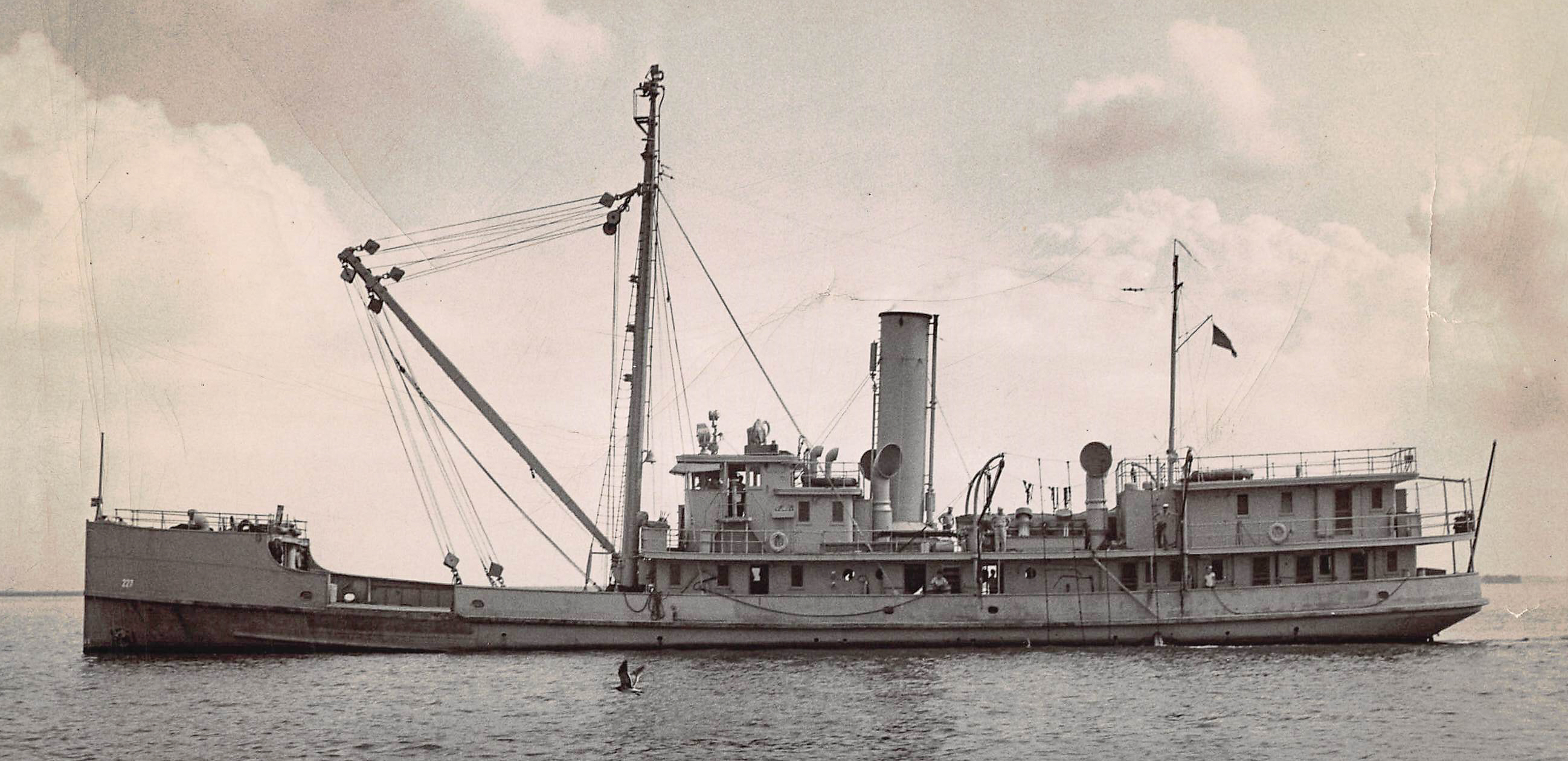
Lilac in September 1945. Her wartime armament is removed, but she is still painted Navy gray.

On 1 November 1941 President Roosevelt issued Executive Order 8929 transferring the U.S. Coast Guard from Treasury Department to United States Navy control. Lilac remained based at Edgemoor, but came under the orders of the 5th Naval District.

Lilac and similar buoy tenders were equipped to play a role in coastal defense, in addition to maintaining their aids to navigation. Lilac was repainted in the Navy's haze gray. A 3"/50 gun was installed on her forecastle, a pair of 20mm/80 Oerlikon cannon aft of her wheelhouse, and two depth charge tracks on her stern. She was equipped with a degaussing system to protect against German magnetic mines which might have been laid in Delaware Bay. Lilac was equipped with an SO-1 surface search radar and a WEA-2 sonar. There is no record of her engaging in combat and all of her deck armament was removed by the end of 1945.

Lilac's buoy tending in World War II included maintaining buoys that indicated swept channels that were clear of mines.

==== Post War ====
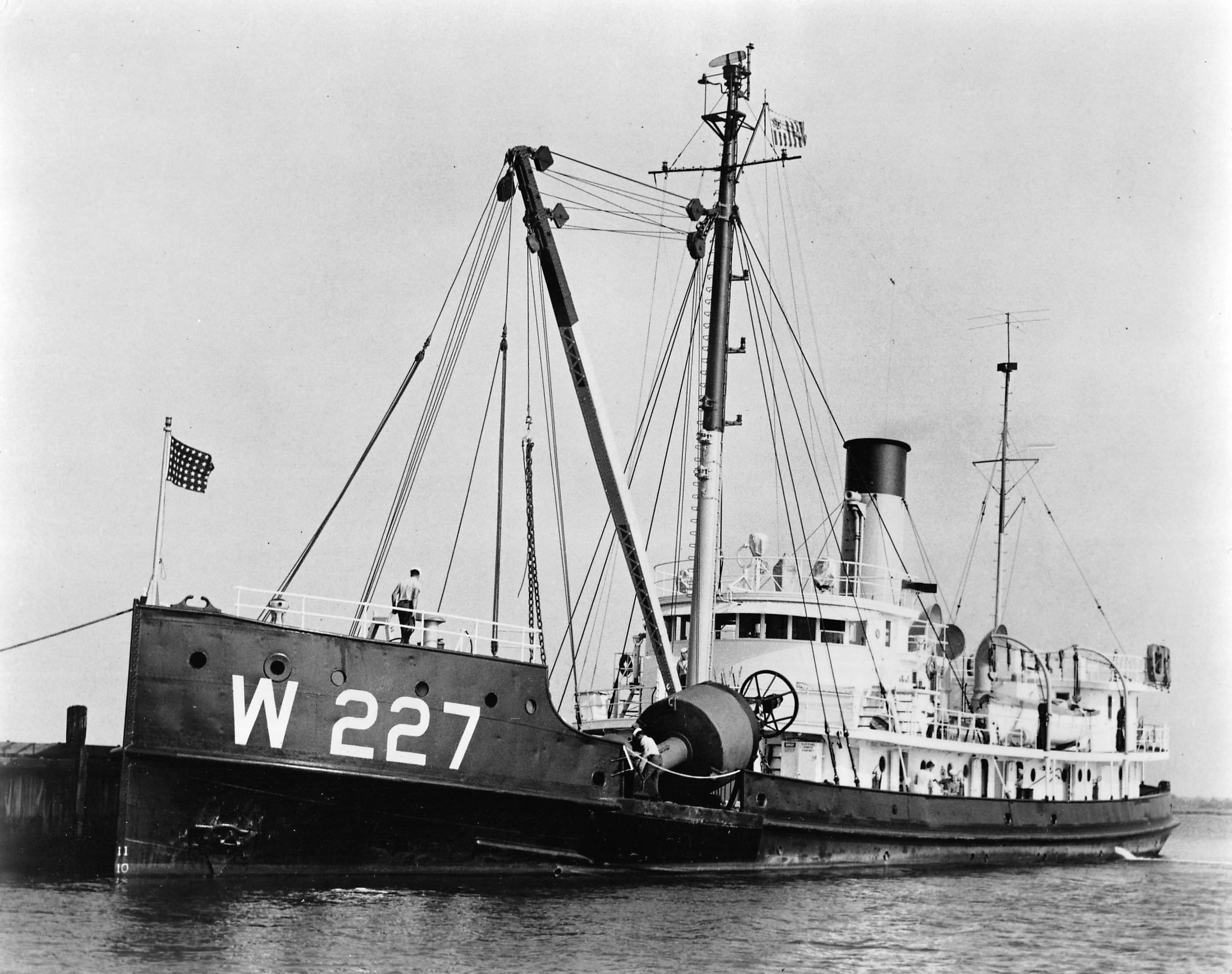
Lilac as a post-war buoy tender

On 28 December 1945 President Truman issued Executive Order 9666 canceling Executive Order 8929 and returning the Coast Guard to Treasury Department control. Lilac returned to her regular buoy tending duties on the Delaware. In 1948 the Edgemoor Depot was closed and Lilac and USCGC Zinnia, which were based there, relocated to the Coast Guard facility across the Delaware River in Gloucester City, New Jersey. In 1965 the Coast Guard reorganized its vessel classification system and Lilac received the new pennant number WLM-227, designating her a coastal buoy tender.

In January 1951, Lilac was dispatched to search for a light plane that crashed into the Delaware River.

A two-year span in 1952 and 1953 included an unusual number of marine disasters to which Lilac responded. Shortly after midnight on 15 May 1952 the tanker F. L. Hayes, loaded with 640,000 U.S. gallons (2,400,000 L) of high-octane gasoline, collided with the freighter Barbara Lykes in the Chesapeake and Delaware Canal about 17 miles south of Wilmington. F. L. Hayes burst into flames and eventually sank. The fire was not extinguished until 4 June. Lilac was on the scene to assist from 15 to 17 May. Less than a week later, during the early morning hours of 22 May 1952, the tanker Atlantic Dealer hit the tug Pateo which was towing two barges. The tug sank and Lilac was dispatched to search for her three missing crewmen. Three days later, on 25 May 1952, two more tankers, A. C. Dodge and Michael had a flaming collision in the Delaware River and Lilac was sent to the scene. The A. C. Dodge was a sister ship of the F. L. Hayes which burned earlier in the month.

1953 began in the same vein. Lilac rescued two crewmen from Benjamin Brothers II, a fishing vessel which sank in January 1953. On 6 June 1953, two tankers collided on the Delaware River about 40 miles south of Philadelphia. Both the Pan Massachusetts and Phoenix burst into flame. Lieutenant (jg) John C. Midgett, Lilac's captain, was the on-scene commander of the response. In addition to keeping curious boaters out of the danger area, Lilac stood by to tow one of the vessels should it drift into the shipping lanes. The tanker Pan Georgia was preparing to leave the Wilmington Marine Terminal after discharging her cargo of gasoline just before midnight on 23 July 1953. Two tugs were standing by to ease her off the wharf. An explosion and fire damaged the ship and both tugs. Lilac fought the fire and searched for survivors in the river. Later that year, on 30 December 1953, two more tankers collided in the Delaware River, this time in a blinding fog. Lilac was dispatched to assist Atlantic Dealer and Atlantic Engineer.

High seas threatened to sink a yacht near the Miah Maull Shoal Light on 12 July 1955 when her captain radioed a distress call. Lilac responded, taking aboard four people from the yacht and placing pumps on the vessel which kept it afloat while she was towed to port. In June 1960 Lilac came to the assistance of another yacht, Limmershin, which had gone aground near New Castle, Delaware.

In another tanker mishap, Lilac went to the assistance of President Dutra, a 30,000-ton Brazilian-flagged ship that went aground near Wilmington in February 1961.

The public was invited to tour Lilac on Armed Forces Day in 1967, 1968, and 1969.

On the night of 7 October 1971 Lilac was moored in the Delaware River. At 1 am, two crewmen fell in the water and cried out for help. Quartermaster Howard A. Jensen and another crewman dove in to attempt to rescue the struggling men. Jensen died in the effort, and was posthumously awarded the Coast Guard Medal for his heroism. The other three men in the water were rescued.

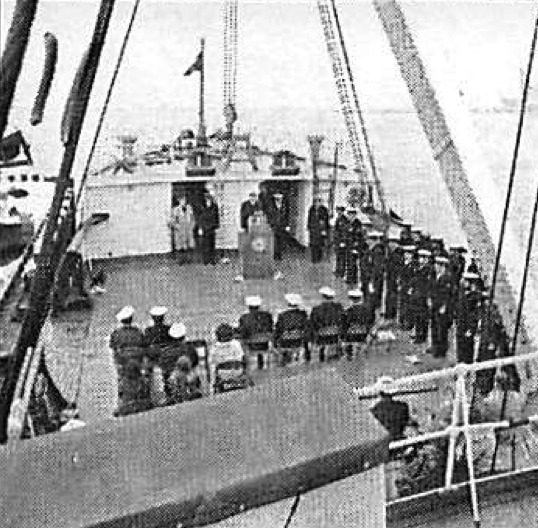
Lilac decommissioning ceremony, 3 February 1972

=== Obsolescence and disposal ===
The Department of Transportation requested $3.1 million to build a buoy tender to replace Lilac in its fiscal year 1970 budget request. The department characterized the ship as having "reached the limit of its economic life." It noted that all machinery was steam-driven, and that "spare parts are practically non-existent and must be fabricated."

Lilac was decommissioned on 3 February 1972 at the Coast Guard Yard at Curtis Bay, Maryland. She was the last steam-driven ship in the Coast Guard when retired. She was replaced by USCGC Red Oak.

== Private ownership (1972–present) ==
=== Seafarer's International Union (1971–1984) ===
Lilac was donated to the Seafarers Harry Lundeburg School of Seamanship, an affiliate of the Seafarers International Union on 6 June 1972. She was used as a dormitory for the students of the school, and as staff offices, and classroom space. Lilac was moored in the Potomac River at Piney Point, Maryland during this period. She was sold on 24 October 1984 to Atlantic Towing Corporation.

=== Atlantic Towing Corporation (1984–1985) ===
The assets of Atlantic Towing, including Lilac, were sold at auction on 3 April 1985 at Norfolk, Virginia. She was sold to Henry A. Houck, owner of Falling Creek Marina.

=== Falling Creek Marina (1985–2003) ===
Lilac was moved to the Falling Creek Marina on the James River in Richmond, Virginia where she served as office space for the marine salvage business. As early as 1990, Houck was planning to wind down operations and sell off assets. Houck died in 1995 before finishing the effort.

=== Lilac Preservation Project (2003–present) ===
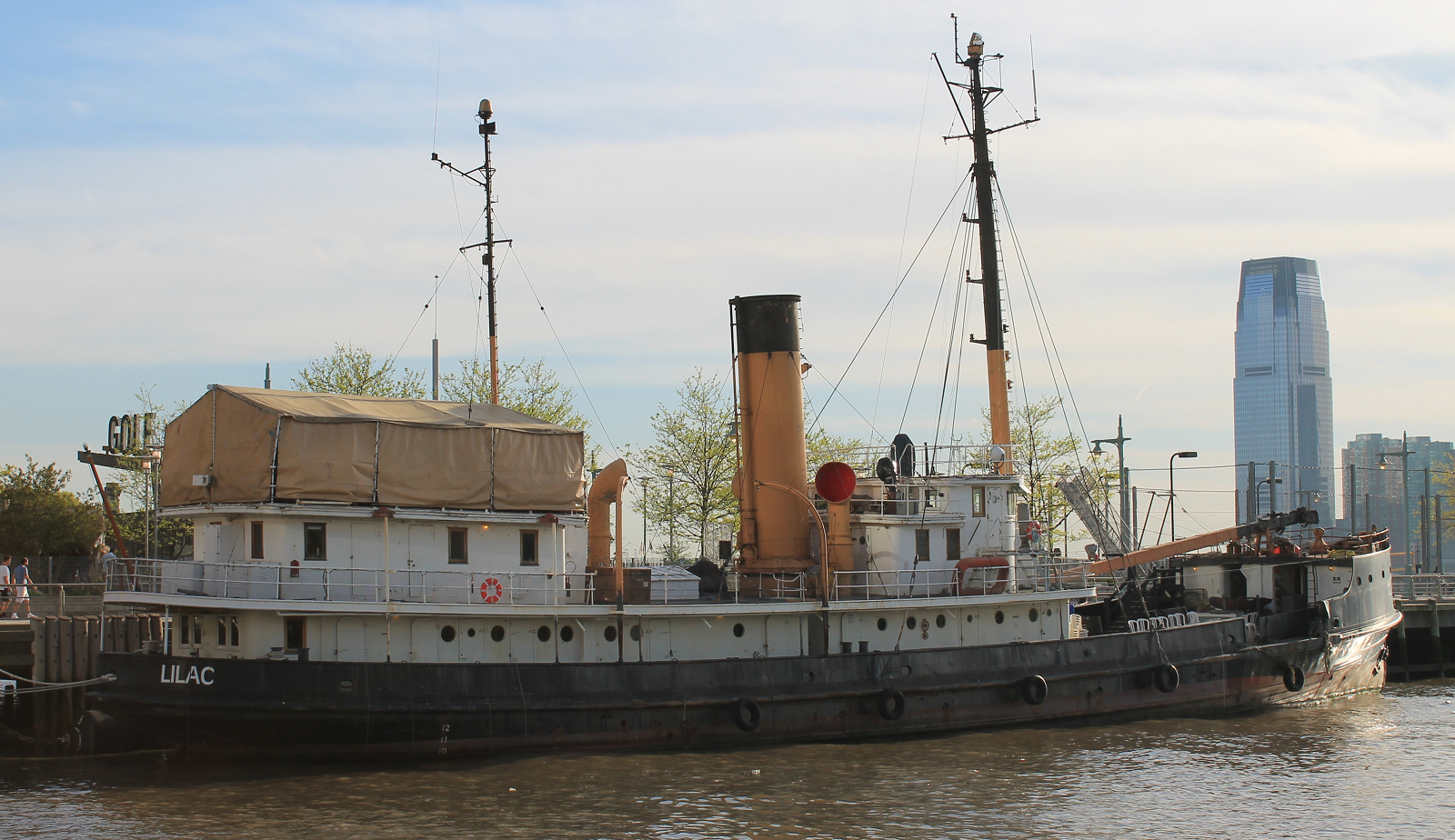
Lilac in New York in 2017

Lilac was purchased for $25,000 in 2003 by the Tug Pegasus Preservation Project, a non-profit organization dedicated to preserving the historic tugboat Pegasus. Lilac was towed to Lyon Shipyard in Norfolk, Virginia and received $250,000 of restoration work. After her shipyard visit, she was towed to New York where she was berthed at pier 40 in lower Manhattan. She arrived there on 31 December 2003. She was donated to the newly-formed Lilac Preservation Project, a separate non-profit, in 2004. Lilac was added to the National Register of Historic Places on 7 January 2005. She is now a museum ship, docked at Hudson River Park Pier 25, near North Moore Street in the Tribeca neighborhood of Manhattan.

== Gallery ==
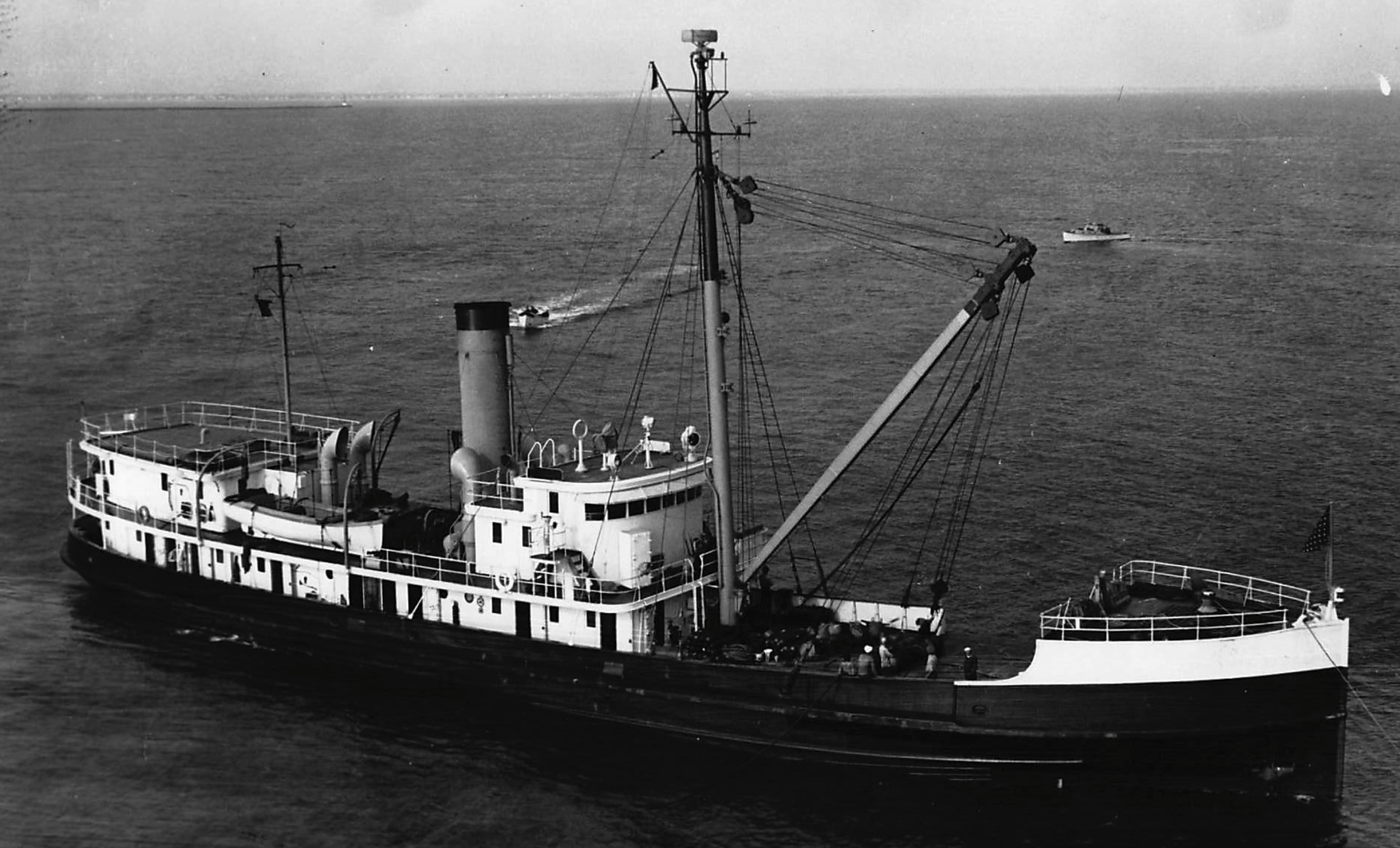
Lilac in 1946

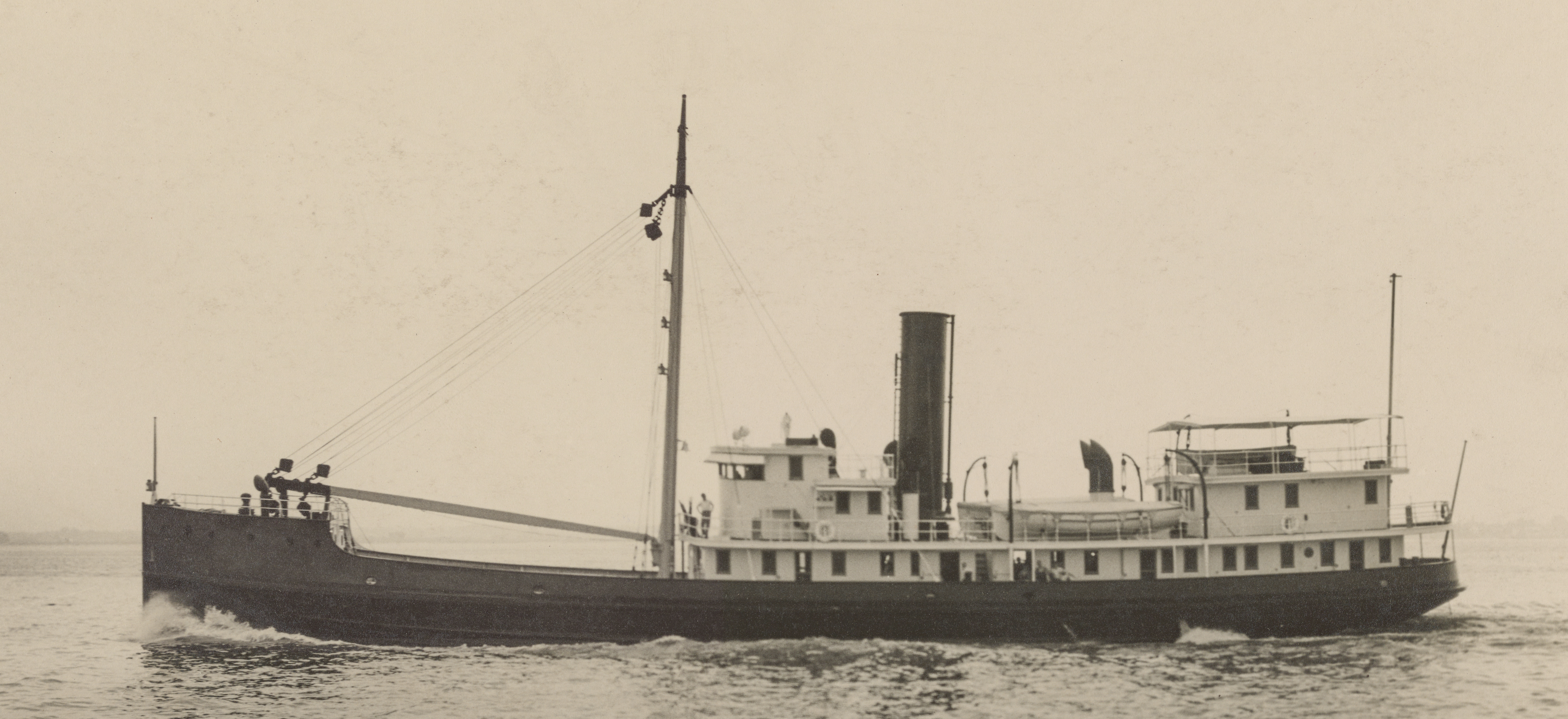
USLHT Lilac

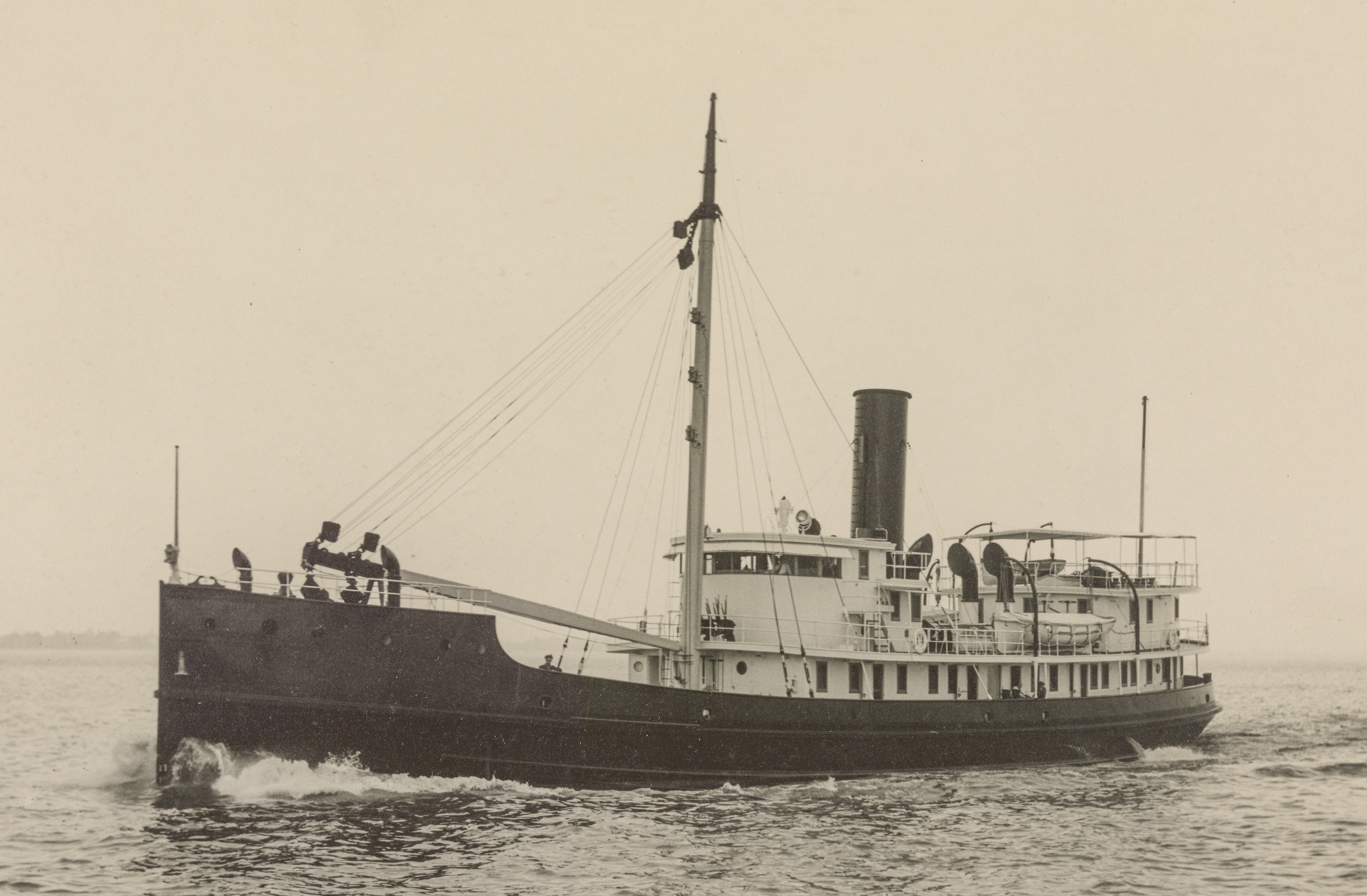
USLHT Lilac

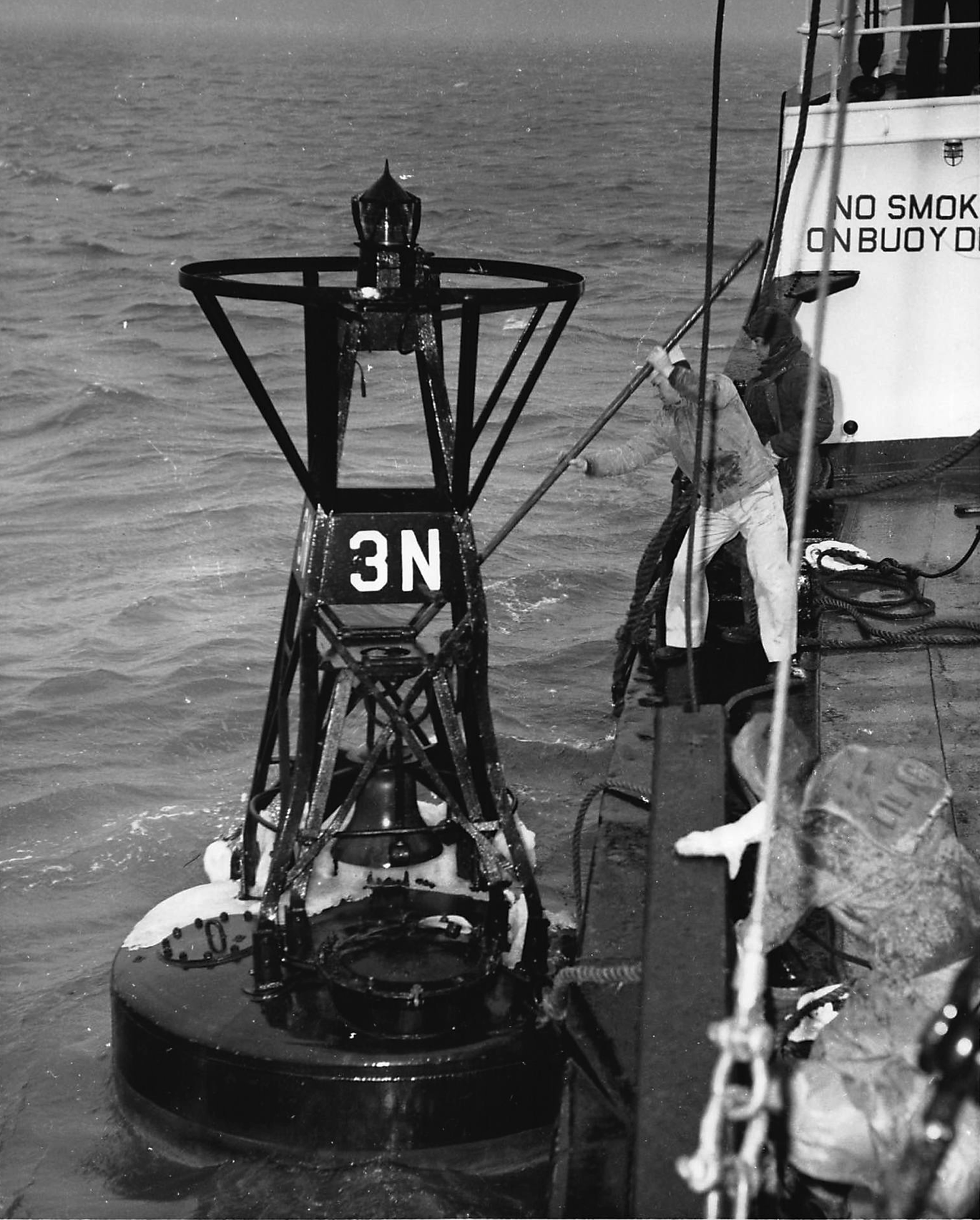
Lilac crew knocks ice off buoy

== See also ==
- National Register of Historic Places listings in Manhattan below 14th Street
