= USLHT Iris (1897 ship) =

US Lighthouse Tender

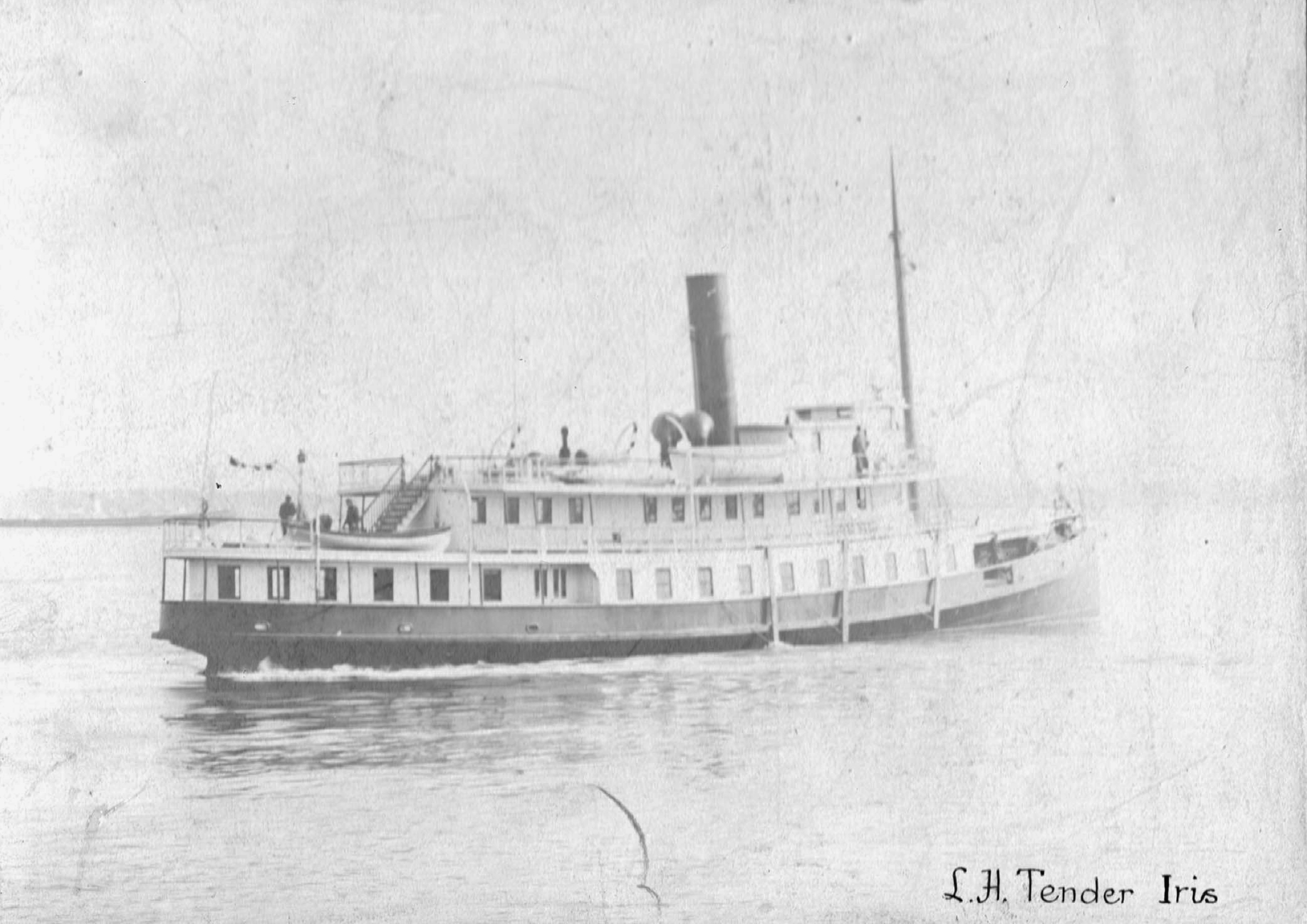
- USLHT Iris in 1900

History

United States
- Name: Plymouth
- Operator: Winthrop Steamboat Company
- Builder: Neafie & Levy, Philadelphia
- Launched: 1897
- Identification: Signal Letters: KNBQ; Official number: 150754
- Fate: Sold to U.S. Lighthouse Board

United States
- Name: USLHT Iris
- Operator: United States Lighthouse Service
- Acquired: 13 December 1899
- Identification: Signal letters: GVPH
- Fate: Transferred to U.S. Navy

United States
- Name: USS Iris
- Operator: United States Navy
- Acquired: 11 April 1917
- Fate: Transferred to U.S. Lighthouse Service

United States
- Name: USLHT Iris
- Operator: U.S. Lighthouse Service
- Acquired: 1 July 1919
- Identification: Signal letters: GVPH
- Fate: Sold

United States
- Name: Big Chief
- Operator: Pocahontas Coal Company
- Acquired: February 1939
- Fate: Requisitioned for military service

United States
- Name: USS Big Chief
- Operator: U. S. Navy
- Acquired: 5 may 1943
- Identification: Signal Letters: NJBK
- Fate: Sold 26 February 1948

United States
- Name: Big Chief (1948-1954); B. O. Colonna (1954-1973)
- Fate: Scrapped in 1973

General characteristics as built in 1897
- Tonnage: 428 Gross register tons; 292 Net register tons
- Length: 142 ft (43 m)
- Beam: 30 ft (9.1 m)
- Draft: 8 ft (2.4 m)
- Depth of hold: 10.4 ft (3.2 m)
- Installed power: 800 HP triple-conversion steam engine

USLHT Iris was a steel-hulled, steam-powered ship built in Philadelphia in 1897. She began life as an excursion boat for day trips between Boston and Plymouth, Massachusetts as Plymouth. She was purchased by the Lighthouse Board and became a lighthouse tender in 1899. She was transferred to the United States Navy during World War I and became USS Iris. She returned to her duties with the United States Lighthouse Service in 1919. She was sold in 1939 and became a collier and bulk freighter named Big Chief. In 1942, after the American entry into World War II, the ship was requisitioned into military service with the United States Army Corps of Engineers. She was transferred to the Navy for the second time in 1943 and became USS Big Chief (IX-101). Declared surplus after the war, she was sold back into private hands in 1948 and became a fishing boat for the remainder of her career. Her name was changed yet again after a 1954 refit to B. O. Colonna. She was scrapped in 1973.

== Construction and characteristics ==
Plymouth was built by the Neafie and Levy Ship and Engine Building Company in Philadelphia, Pennsylvania. She was commissioned by the Winthrop Steamboat Company, which intended to use her as a seasonal excursion boat to take passengers from Boston to Plymouth, Massachusetts. She was designed to have as many as 900 passengers aboard. She was launched in early 1897, likely in March.

Her hull was built of steel. She was 153 feet (47 m) long overall, 142 feet (43 m) long on her waterline, with a beam of 30 feet (9.1 m), and a depth of hold of 10.4 feet (3.2 m). As a lighthouse tender, she had a fully loaded draft of 10 feet (3.0 m). Her gross register tonnage was 428 and her net register tonnage was 292.

Plymouth was driven by a single propeller, 8 feet 6 inches (2.59 m) in diameter. Power was provided by a single triple-conversion steam engine that produced 800 horsepower. Its high, medium, and low-pressure cylinders had diameters of 15, 23, and 39 inches with a stroke of 28 inches. Steam was provided by a single coal-fired boiler 12 feet (3.7 m) long and 13 feet 6 inches (4.11 m) in diameter. This power plant made her a fast ship for her day. Her average speed as a lighthouse tender was 12 knots.

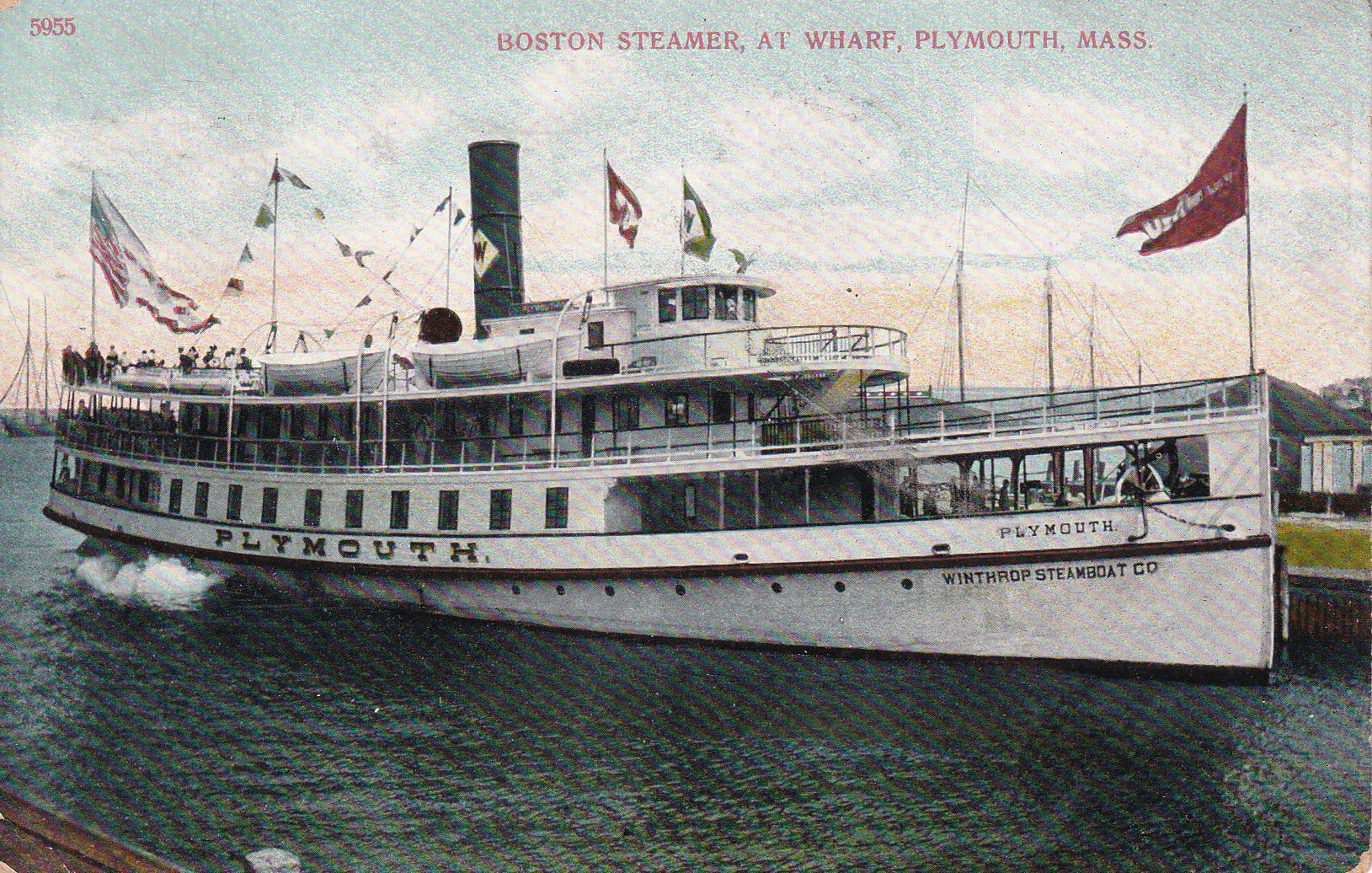
Plymouth at her dock in Plymouth

As originally built, Plymouth had four decks, lower, main, saloon, and hurricane. On the hurricane deck were the pilot house, staterooms for the captain and first officer, and two passenger staterooms. On the saloon deck were four passenger staterooms, and two saloons. On the main deck were four passenger staterooms, a social hall, a dining room which would seat 50, baggage storage, and washrooms. The lower deck contained the engine and boiler rooms, crew quarters and mess, and the galley.

Plymouth was named for her main destination, Plymouth, Massachusetts.

== Winthrop Line service (1897–1899) ==
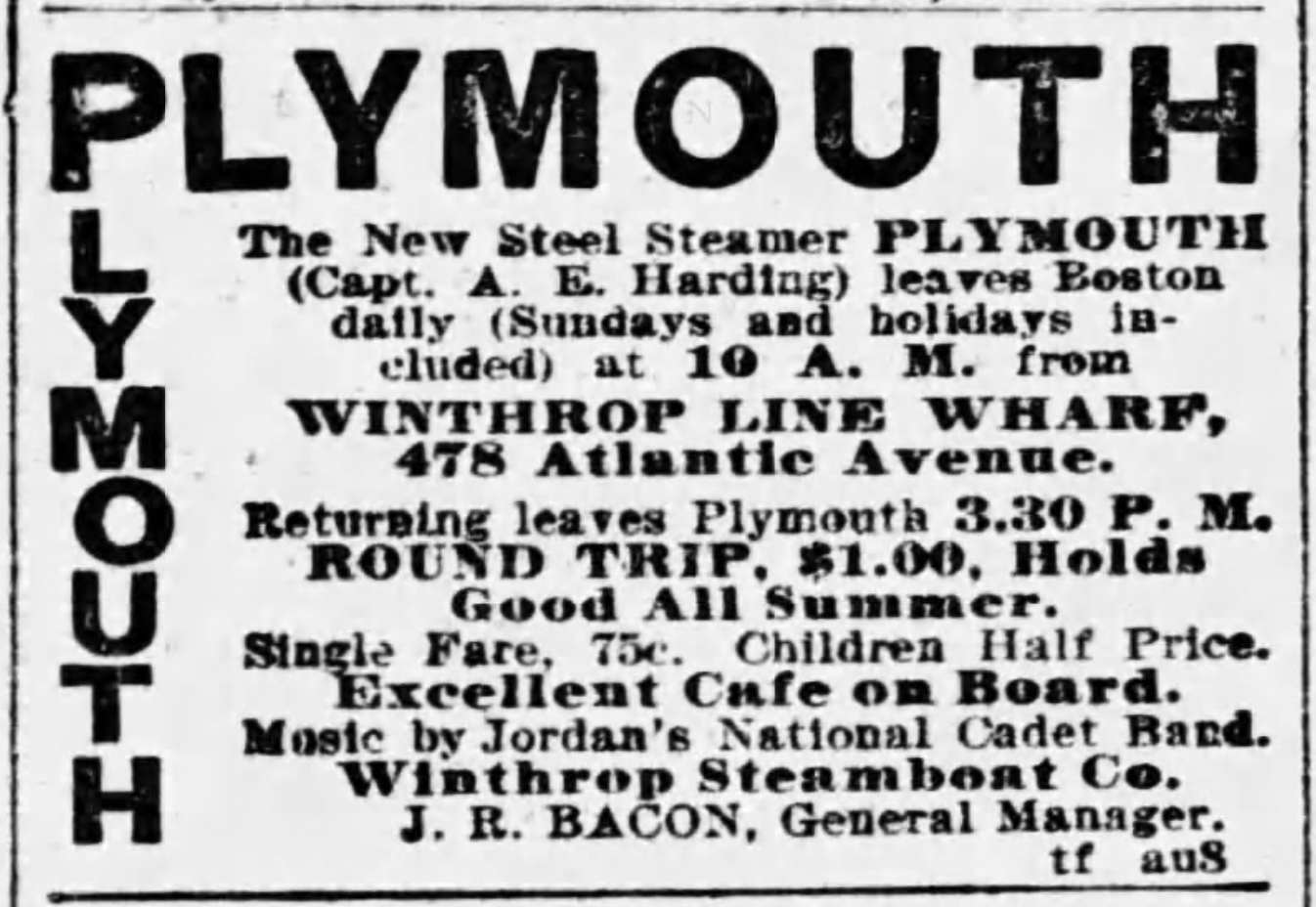
1898 newspaper ad for excursion aboard Plymouth

Plymouth sailed one round-trip per day between the Winthrop Line wharf in Boston and Plymouth. As this was a recreational excursion, she sailed only during the warmer months. For example, her first scheduled sailing in 1898 was on 12 June. She sailed at 10 am and arrived at Plymouth at 12:55 pm. The return trip left Plymouth at 3:30 PM. The round-trip fare was $1. There was a cafe aboard and a band provided live music.

Plymouth was also chartered for private events, as on 11 June 1998 when the Boston Bank Officers' Association had 400 members on board for a Boston Harbor cruise.

In perhaps her most special event, she was chartered to serve as a tender for Sir Thomas Lipton's yacht Shamrock during his challenge for the 1899 America's Cup. Negotiations began on the charter in March 1899, and in June 1899 a 50-day charter contract was signed. Plymouth was delivered to Lipton's team on 5 September 1899 in New York to begin the charter. The ship was used as crew quarters for the 70 men who sailed Shamrock. While Plymouth already had staterooms for her officers and a crew of 30 men, Lipton's staff added berthing for 50 additional men.

In November 1899, J. R. Bacon, the general manager of the Winthrop Line, was in negotiations with the Lighthouse Board to sell Plymouth. He asked $80,000 for the ship.

== U.S. Government service (1899–1939) ==
In its annual reports for 1897 and 1898, the Lighthouse Board advised the Secretary of the Treasury that the lighthouse tenders in the 3rd Lighthouse District "are so nearly worn-out that they can only last if used with care until vessels can be built to take their places". Congress responded by appropriating $85,000 for the construction of a new ship on 3 March 1899. Rather than wait to design and build a new ship, the Lighthouse Board decided to purchase an existing ship and convert it into a lighthouse tender. It purchased Plymouth from the Winthrop Steamboat Company on 13 December 1899 for $77,500. On 18 December 1899 she was commissioned as a lighthouse tender and became USLHT Iris. The ship immediately began a conversion project to fit her for her new duties. By the end of January 1900 her conversion was completed at a cost of about $6,500. In her new configuration, she displaced 606 tons, fully loaded, and 519 tons light.

Lighthouse tenders were named for trees and flowering plants. Iris was named after the Iris genus of flowering plants. She was the second lighthouse tender named Iris, the first having been built in 1863 and sold in 1892.

=== 3rd Lighthouse District (1899-1910) ===
Iris first sailed in the fleet of the U.S. Lighthouse Board, a bureau of the U.S. Department of the Treasury. In this quasi-military organization, each Lighthouse District had a District Inspector, typically a Naval officer, and a District Engineer, typically an officer from the Army Corps of Engineers. While the District Engineer was primarily responsible for the construction and maintenance of lighthouses, piers, and other structures, the District Inspector was primarily responsible for supplying lighthouses and lightships, and maintaining buoys and lightships in their assigned locations. Iris was initially assigned to the District Engineer of the 3rd Lighthouse District. She was based at the general lighthouse depot at Thompkinsville, Staten Island, New York. At that time, the 3rd Lighthouse District encompassed the coasts of Rhode Island, Connecticut, New York, and portions of New Jersey. In 1909, Iris had a crew of 5 officers and 17 men.

Iris maintained many of the lighthouses, fog signals, and other facilities of the 3rd Lighthouse District. These included Gull Island Light, Plum Island Light, Race Rock, and Sperry Light.

In 1903, the Lighthouse Board was transferred to the newly created U.S. Department of Commerce and Labor. Since the Lighthouse Board still had operational control, little changed in Iris' operations.

==== Notable events ====
U.S. Senator Chauncey Depew sailed on Iris to New York to attend the launch of Prince Henry of Prussia's yacht, Meteor in 1902. The launch was attended by President Roosevelt, whose daughter, Alice, christened the vessel.

In September 1906, Secretary of the Treasury Lyman J. Gage took a vacation cruise along the New England coast aboard Iris.

=== 4th Lighthouse District (1910–1917) ===
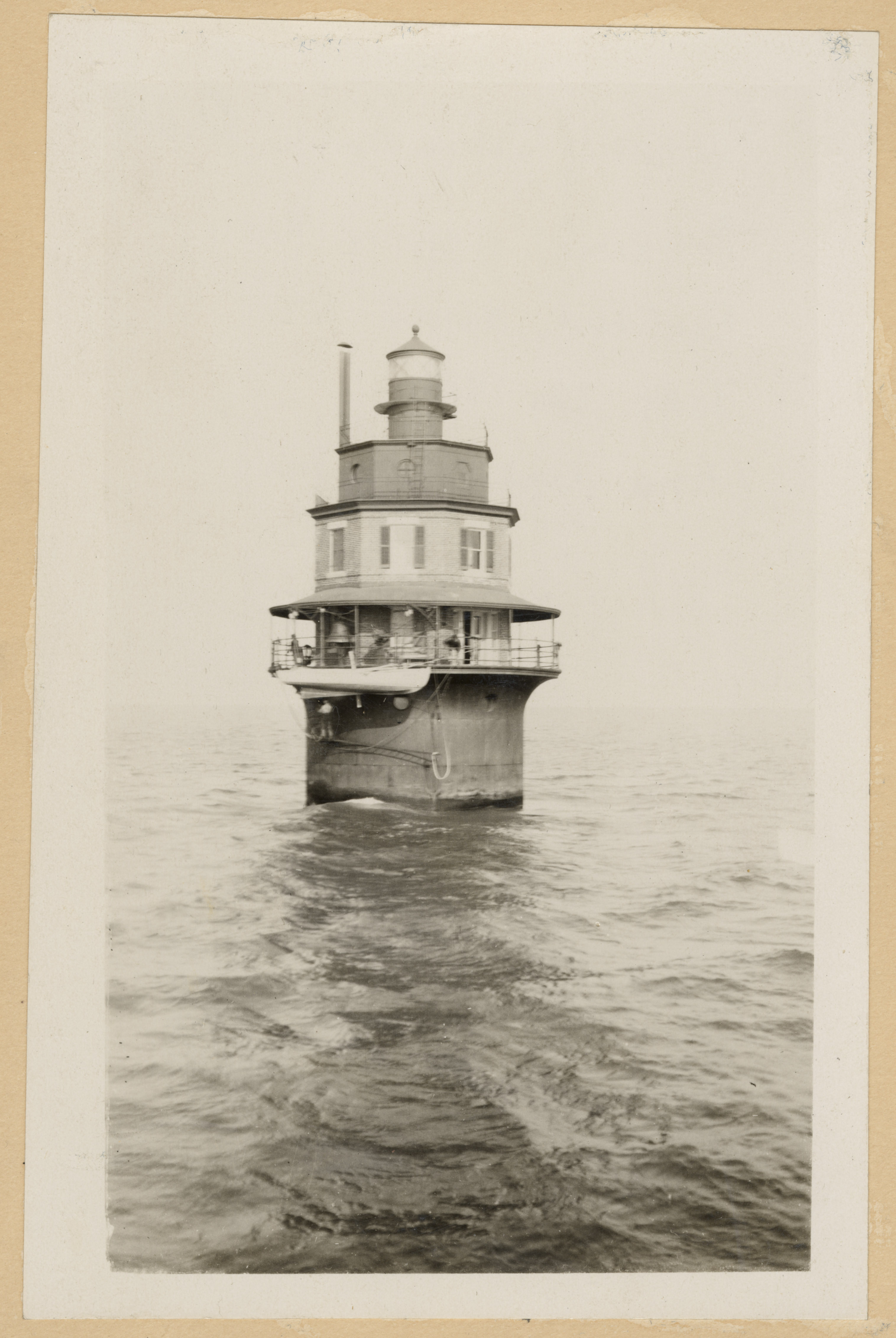
Elbow of Cross Ledge Light Station taken from the deck of Iris in 1914

In 1910, Congress abolished the Lighthouse Board and replaced it with the all-civilian Lighthouse Bureau of the Department of Commerce and Labor. This change did impact the ship's work in that District Inspectors and Engineers were replaced by a single civilian District Supervisor. All ships did any construction, maintenance, or buoy tending they were assigned. Iris began tending buoys as regular part of her work. The reorganization of the Lighthouse Service allowed the retirement of five under-used tenders to save costs. As these ships left the service, some of the remaining tenders were redistributed. Iris was reassigned to the 4th Lighthouse District, headquartered in Philadelphia, which included the coast of Delaware, and adjoining portions of the New Jersey, and Virginia shores.

Secretary of Commerce William C. Redfield and a Congressional delegation were aboard Iris on 25 July 1914 for an inspection tour of lighthouses in Delaware Bay. A storm arose and the ship was blown ashore at Cape Henlopen, Delaware. Iris was pulled off the rocks in a half-hour by another ship.

=== United States Navy (1917–1919) ===
On 11 April 1917 President Wilson issued Executive Order 2588 transferring a number of lighthouse tenders to support the American effort in World War I. Iris was transferred to the U.S. Department of War, and she was commissioned into the United States Navy as USS Iris. Among her wartime roles was as a mine planter to defend Delaware Bay, but she remained active tending buoys during her service with the Navy. During the war she was armed with two 3-pounder guns, and two machine guns.

After the war, on 1 July 1919, the components of the Lighthouse Service which had become part of the Navy were returned to the supervision of the Department of Commerce.

=== 4th Lighthouse District (1919–1939) ===
In 1919, Iris returned to her duties in the 4th Lighthouse District. She continued her buoy tending, and maintaining lighthouses, lightships, and their staffs. Sometime during her post-war service, her steam engine was replaced by a Fairbanks-Morse 5-cylinder Diesel engine that produced 450 horsepower. On 25 June 1930 Iris was leaving the Chesapeake and Delaware Canal when a burning yacht was sighted. Iris saved the eight people that were in the water or clinging to the wreckage. Captain C. W. Atkins received a letter of commendation from the Secretary of Commerce for this action.

=== Obsolescence and sale ===
Iris was decommissioned and laid up in 1934. She was replaced by USLHT Lilac. Sealed bids for the purchase of Iris were solicited by the Superintendent of Lighthouses of the 4th District on 19 June 1934. It is not clear if there were any bids or if the bids were inadequate, but in any case the Lighthouse Service kept Iris, albeit laid up and with no crew. Even though she was not in commission or even Federally documented, Iris was occasionally put to use, as in August 1937 when she installed a light on the Delaware River. Iris was finally sold in February 1939.

== Commercial service (1939–1942) ==
In February 1939 Iris was acquired from the Lighthouse Service by S. Norman Holland. At the time of sale, the ship was redocumented under her original name, Plymouth. The ship was sent to the Moon Shipyard and Repair Corporation at Norfolk, Virginia to be refit for her new service. She was homeported at Crisfield, Maryland and was used in the operations of the Pocahontas Coal Company which was headed by Holland. On 27 March 1939 she was redocumented as Big Chief, presumably to fit the theme of the Pocahontas Coal Company fleet. Big Chief was the largest ship, the other two vessels being Pocahontas, and Papoose. During her time with Holland, she carried coal for Pocahontas Coal Company, and a variety of cargoes for other clients. She participated in salvage operations on the liner Manhattan which went aground off West Palm Beach, Florida in January 1941.

United States Navigation Company of New York acquired Big Chief at the end of 1941 with the intention of running her as a coastal freighter between New York and Boston.

== World War II service ==
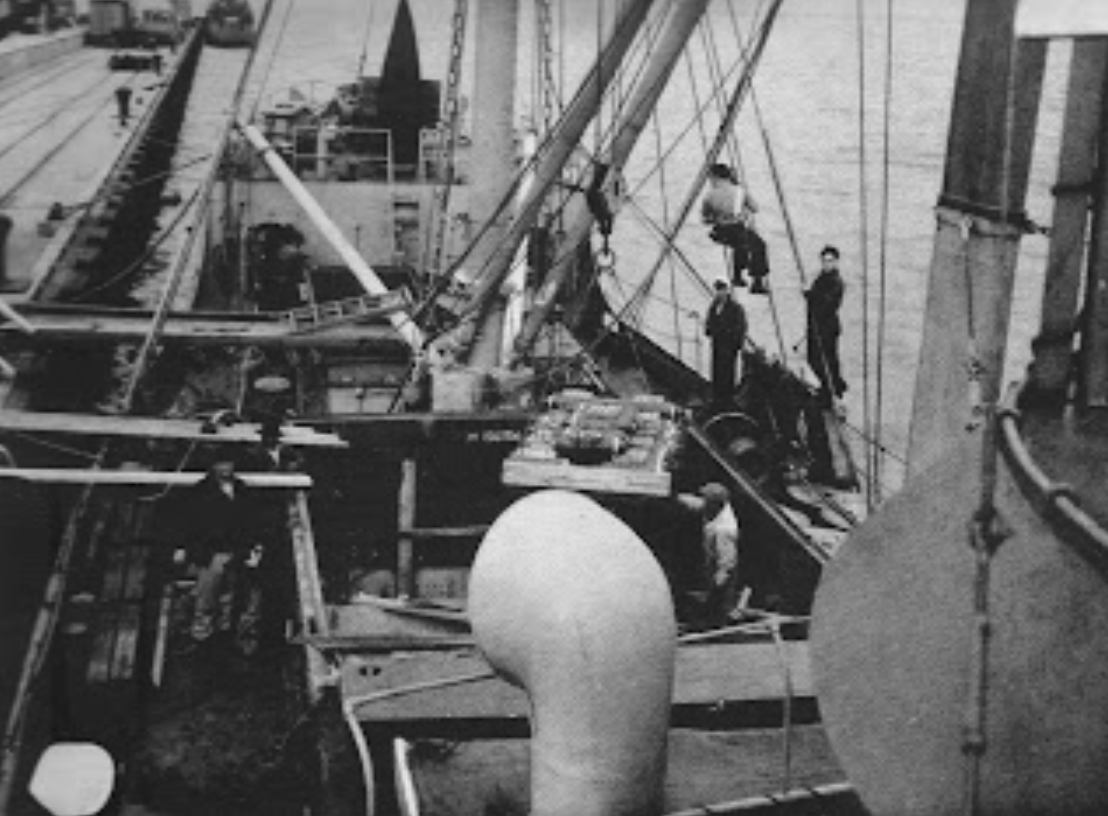
Big Chief off-loading empty warhead casings at Naval Mine Depot

Big Chief was requisitioned by the U.S. Maritime Commission from the U.S. Navigation Company on 4 April 1942. The ship was turned over to the War Department in New York that same day. She was assigned to the U.S. Army Corps of Engineers. The Army used her as a salvage vessel. Records of her Army service are sparse, but she sailed at least as far south as Key West in September 1942. Big Chief arrived at Naval Section Base Moorehead City, North Carolina on 11 April 1943, and left the next day bound for Norfolk.

A week later, on 18 April 1943, the War Department transferred Big Chief to the War Shipping Administration, which in turn transferred her to the U. S. Navy on 5 May 1943. Big Chief was assigned to the Naval Mine Depot in Yorktown, Virginia, a unit of the 5th Naval District. She was designated "IX-101", an uncategorized vessel. The mine depot distributed explosives and related materials to naval installations in the tidewater Virginia area, and Big Chief was busy on these supply runs. For example, during August 1943 she made seven trips from the mine depot to distribute warheads, explosives, naval mines, batteries, ordnance instruments, and other supplies.

On 4 June 1945 USS Roy O. Hale was proceeding to a berth in Yorktown when she hit Big Chief's cargo loading booms. The booms and mast on Big Chief collapsed, and the destroyer escort lost her searchlight.

After the war ended, the flow of munitions reversed as ships in the Navy were decommissioned. For example, in December 1945 Big Chief transported a load of bombs and fuses from Naval Operating Base Norfolk to the mine depot. There was no need for much of this material, and the ship was used to dispose of excess material. During January 1946, Big Chief made two trips with "reject material", likely explosives, for dumping in deep water.

The ship was placed out of service on 28 May 1946, was returned to the War Shipping Administration on 14 June 1946, and entered the National Defense Reserve Fleet. She was moored at Lee Hall, Virginia. Big Chief was struck from the Navy List on 3 July 1946. She was declared surplus and sold to William S. Sanders on 26 February 1948.

== Commercial service (1948–1973) ==
=== Sanders Products Company (1948–1954) ===
William S. Sanders of Norfolk, Virginia purchased Big Chief in February 1948. He converted the ship into a menhaden fishing boat at the Norfolk Shipbuilding and Drydock Company.

Sanders died in March 1954. His estate was sued for unpaid debts and his three vessels, including Big Chief, were seized by the U.S. Marshalls Service and scheduled for auction.

=== Norfolk Ship Salvage Company (1954–1969) ===
The Norfolk Ship Salvage Company, Inc. purchased Big Chief at auction on 7 September 1954 for $23,000. She was substantially rebuilt by Colonna's Shipyard, Inc. in Norfolk, Virginia. Her superstructure was stripped off and new crew quarters were built. The ship was renamed B. O. Colonna, after Captain Benjamin O. Colonna Sr., the father of the president of both the salvage company and shipyard. She was refit as a menhaden fishing boat, and had some success. She returned to port with a catch of 300,000 menhaden after only a few hours of fishing in July 1955. Her full capacity after her refit was about 700,000 menhaden.

In the 1960s, new hydraulic power block technology for hauling back purse seine nets promised large productivity gains on fishing boats, but required significant new investment. The company chose to exit the business rather than make the additional investment. B. O. Colonna and the two other ships in her company's fishing fleet were sold to Haynie Products, Inc. of Reedville, Virginia in 1969 for $500,000.

=== Haynie Products (1969–1973) ===
Haynie Products was a large fishing and fish processing business. In 1972 it had 19 vessels, including B. O. Colonna, which fished Chesapeake Bay and nearby coastal waters. In 1973, the fish populations the company depended on, particularly river herring, declined substantially due to overfishing. The ship disappears from Federal documentation at this time and was likely scrapped in 1973.
