= Rockingham County High School =

American school in North Carolina

Location
- 180 High School Road; Reidsville, North Carolina 27320; United States; 36°23′42″N 79°45′21″W

Information
- Established: 1952 (74 years ago)
- School board: Rockingham County Schools
- CEEB code: 344250
- Principal: Russel Vernon
- Teaching staff: 48.59 (FTE)
- Grades: 9–12
- Enrollment: 899 (2023–2024)
- Student to teacher ratio: 18.50
- Colors: Silver and black
- Mascot: Cougar
- Website: www.rock.k12.nc.us/o/rchs/

Rockingham County High School (RCHS) is located in Wentworth, North Carolina. It is located near Rockingham County Middle School, which feeds into the high school.

== Academics ==
Many classes have optional honors credits, and the school offers AP credit in the following courses: Biology, Calculus, Language and Composition, Literature and Composition, World History, and U.S. History.

== Demographics ==
62.7% of students are White, 19.8% of students are African-American, and 17.5% of students are of other ethnicities.

== Athletics ==
RCHS is currently a member of the North Carolina High School Athletic Association (NCHSAA) and are classified as a 5A school. The school is a part of the Mid-State 3A/4A/5A Conference. Their biggest rivals are Reidsville High School and Morehead High School, both of which are also operated by Rockingham County Schools.

The school currently fields teams in these sports:

Fall: Cross country, football, cheerleading, men's soccer, football, women's golf, women's tennis, women's volleyball

Winter: Men's basketball, Women's basketball, basketball cheerleading, swimming, wrestling

Spring: Baseball, men's golf, men's tennis, track & field, women's soccer, and softball

Rockingham's baseball team won the state championship in 1996. In the winters of 2002 and 2003, the women's basketball team fell in back-to-back state finals games. The men's and women's golf teams combined have had 11 state championship appearances since 2006. In 2015, 2016, 2017, and 2018, Rockingham County's women's golf team won four straight state championships.

== Notable alumni ==
- BJ Barham, front man of American Aquarium
- Mel Gibson, former NBA player
- Jennifer King, first full-time black female coach in NFL history
- Bryan Mitchell, former MLB pitcher
- John Settle, college football coach, former NFL running back and Pro Bowl selection in 1988
- Greg Wittman, former professional basketball player
