= John Motley Morehead High School =

American public school in North Carolina

Coordinates: 36.50518°N 79.73601°W

Location
- 134 N. Pierce Street, Eden, NC 27288; Eden, North Carolina; United States

Information
- Type: Public high school secondary school
- Motto: Panther Pride
- Established: 1952 (74 years ago)
- Status: Open
- School district: Rockingham County Schools
- CEEB code: 343715
- Principal: Jason Tuggle
- Faculty: 79
- Teaching staff: 38.24 (FTE)
- Grades: 9–12
- Gender: Co-Educational
- Enrollment: 771 (2024–2025)
- Student to teacher ratio: 20.16
- Campus: Suburban
- Colors: Black, white, and red
- Sports: Baseball, Basketball, Cheerleading, Cross Country, Football, Golf, Soccer, Softball, Swimming, Tennis, Volleyball, Wrestling
- Mascot: Panther
- Nickname: Panthers
- Rival: Rockingham County High School, Reidsville High School
- Feeder schools: James E. Holmes Middle School
- Website: https://www.rock.k12.nc.us/o/mhs

John Motley Morehead High School is a four-year public high school located in Eden, North Carolina, United States. Morehead High School is part of the Rockingham County Schools school district.

== History ==
The school opened in 1952 as Tri-City High School to serve the then-separate communities of Eden, Leaksville, Spray, and Draper. The school gained its current name in 1958 in honor of John Motley Morehead III (1870–1965), who donated to a number of projects for the school. These projects included Carillon Bells and a football stadium and fieldhouse. Four building projects expanded the high school: a classroom and auditorium building in 1960, a library in 1968, a gymnasium in 1981, and the cafeteria and science building in 1991. Students from the former historically African American high school, Douglass High School, were integrated into Morehead's student body in the fall of 1966. The industrial education center was housed on the school's campus through 1966. It became a countywide setting for vocational training. Later, it was removed and re-established at Rockingham Community College located in Wentworth, North Carolina.

== Demographics ==
As of August 2016, 53% of students are White, 22% of students are African American, and 25% of students are of other ethnicities.

== Curriculum ==
Morehead provides students with a variety of subjects and courses to take for either a standard or advanced diploma, such as Math, Science, Social Studies, English, and also Foreign language classes, Theater Arts, etc.

== Programs ==
MHS also runs an Army Junior Reserve Officers' Training Corps (JROTC) program for students who may join the Army instead of attending a College or four-year institution. Other programs include career and technical education and the Career and College Promise program. Morehead also has a Health Science Program

== Athletics ==
Morehead is a part of the North Carolina High School Athletic Association (NCHSAA) and is classified as a 4A school. The school competes in the 3A/4A/5A Mid-State Conference. Morehead's biggest rivals are Reidsville High School and Rockingham County High School.

"Fall Sports": Cross country, Football, Volleyball, Girls Golf

"Winter Sports ": Boys JV Basketball, Boys Varsity Basketball, Girls JV Basketball, Girls Varsity Basketball, Wrestling, co-ed Swimming, co-ed Indoor Track

"Spring Sports": Boys JV Baseball, Boys Varsity Baseball, Girls JV Softball, Girls Varsity Softball, Boys Golf, co-ed Outdoor Track

=== Wrestling Team ===
The Morehead Panthers wrestling team won the NCHSAA 3A dual team state championship in 1998, 1999, 2002, 2003, 2006, 2014, and 2016. They were the NCHSAA 3A state tournament team champions in 1998, 1999, 2006, 2014, and 2015.

==== Super 32 Challenge ====
In the mid-1990s, Morehead High School started a pre-season tournament to help raise money for their wrestling program. In 2000, the "Super 32 Challenge" name was added, with tournament growth starting to build from that point. The "Super 32" represented the name of the North Carolina high school wrestler rankings. In 2001, Great Bridge High School in Chesapeake, Virginia, entered the tournament, with their nationally ranked wrestlers further helping spur tournament growth. The Super 32 soon grew to have over 1,000+ wrestlers entering the tournament, and by 2005, it had moved from Morehead High School to the Greensboro Coliseum in Greensboro, North Carolina. The tournament now has over 2,000+ wrestlers each season in the high school division alone, and is known as one of the toughest high school wrestling tournaments in the country.

== Notable alumni ==
- Norwood Creek, director, producer, and editor of film and television
- Antico Dalton, former NFL linebacker and defensive lineman
- Takayo Siddle, college basketball head coach
