= Norwood Cheek =

American music video director

- Born: Norwood J. Cheek Jr. North Carolina, U.S.
- Education: University of North Carolina; Morehead High School
- Occupations: Director, producer, editor
- Years active: 1990–present
- Known for: 8mm film, music videos, Flicker Film Festival

Norwood J. Cheek, Jr. is an American director, producer, and editor of film and television. He is known for his music videos and his work with Super 8 film.

== Background ==
Cheek is from Eden, North Carolina and graduated from Morehead High School. He says, “I was drawn to the magical beauty of Super 8 film and started making short Super 8s in high school and through college." He graduated from the University of North Carolina at Chapel Hill in 1990 with a degree in French.

After graduation, he continued living in Chapel Hill, playing music with the band Sex Police. Cheek said, “In 1991 I had a lot of black-and-white Super 8 film but didn't have an idea for a short. So I asked Superchunk if they wanted to do a music video—I was hooked ever since.” He began directing music videos for local bands and starting a film festival. In 1997, Cheek secured an agent and moved to Los Angeles, California to pursue opportunities in the film industry.

== Film ==
In the early 1990s, Cheek began filming music videos for local bands, many of who were on the Chapel Hill-based indie labels Mammoth Records and Merge Records. He says, "I was one of the few people in town who had a 16mm camera. Of course, I was really into approaching these bands and saying, 'Let me make your video for you.'" He also directed a documentary on the Chapel Hill music scene called Young Rock/Chapel Hill (VHS, Mammouth,1994). The film featured 17 bands, including Archers of Loaf, Dillon Fence, Five Eight, Flat Duo Jets, Southern Culture on the Skids, Superchunk, and The Veldt. Cheek said, "I set out to do videos for basically every band in Chapel Hill."

In 1997, Cheek relocated to Los Angeles and worked with national acts. He has directed more than 60 music videos for bands such as 12 Stones, AFI, Ben Folds Five, The Beths, The Donnas, Eels, Five-Eight, French Kicks, She & Him, Soul Coughing, Superchunk, Squirrel Nut Zippers, Toenut, and Tsunami. Cheek shot more than half of these music videos using Super 8.

Cheek's short films have played in festivals around the world. In 1995, his film I dreamed and bluebird (1996) premiered at the Cucalorus Film Festival in Wilmington, North Carolina. In 1997, it won Best Experimental Film at the Carolina Film and Video Festival. In 2011, Cucalorus had a retrospective of 20 years of Cheek's short films and videos.

Cheek was a producer/editor for the films Bring It On (2000), May (2002), Down with Love (2004), Beowulf (2007), Yes Man (2008), Aliens in the Attic (2009), Yogi Bear (2010), and Judy Moody and the Not Bummer Summer (2011) and the television shows Celebrity Fitness Club, The Lowe Files, Nanny 911, The Profit, Survivor, Shahs of Sunset, and Shark Week.

Cheek's acting credits include voicing several guest characters in the King of the Hill and being commercials for IBM, Sony, and Volkswagen. He also has played credited small parts or extras in the films May (2002), Judy Moody and the Not Bummer Summer (2011), and Ant-Man and the Wasp (2018). He is featured in the J. J. Abrams' Super 8 Blu-ray documentary 8mm Revolution.

== Film Festivals ==
=== Flicker Film Festival ===
Cheek started and ran the Flicker Film Festival in Chapel Hill in 1994. Flicker was a concept that originated in Athens, Georgia; when Cheek cloned that bi-monthly event in 1994, Chapel Hill second of what became many such festivals across the United States. Flicker entries are 15 minutes or less in length and are made with Super 8 or 16 mm film, rather than video. Mammoth Records purchased and loaned a Super 8 projector for the Festival, "as an informal grant to Cheek partially to thank him for his music videos for their artists."

In its first three years, the Chapel Hill Flicker Film Festival showed 120 films in ten other festivals in Chapel Hill and two festivals in Europe. Cheek says, "I have had a lot of people who started making films of Flicker. That's really the greatest triumph for me—awakening the artistic side of someone that they have been neglecting." However, what initially made Chapel Hill's Flicker so unique was the participation of UNC alumni, including some big Hollywood and New York names: Phil Morrison (Junebung), Peyton Reed (Bring It On, Down With Love), and John Schultz (Like Mike). Local musicians also created films for Cheek's Flicker, including Jimbo Mathus (Squirrel Nut Zippers), Tom Maxwell (Squirrel Nut Zippers), and John Plymate (Sex Police).

In 1997, Cheek started another Flicker Film Festival in Los Angeles. From 2000 to 2010, Cheek also headed up the Los Angeles version of Flicker's Attack of the 50 Foot Reels. For this event, the film is shot on one 50 foot reel of film, and then edited by Flicker. Check also created the zine Flicker Guide to the World of Super 8.

In November 1999, the Best of Flicker Chapel Hill went on a tour of nine cities, including Asheville, NC; Atlanta, GA; Athens, GA; Beaufort, SC; Charleston, SC; Columbia, SC; Savannah, GA; Wilmington, NC; and Winston-Salem, NC. In 2000, Cheek brought the best of Flicker to the West Coast, hitting cities ranging from Bellingham, Washington; to Vancouver, Canada. In 2003, Cheek took the Best of Flicker to seven cities from Los Angeles to Seattle.

The Flicker Film Festival ended in Chapel Hill in 2008 and in Los Angeles in 2010 as film stock needed for the events was discontinued by manufacturers.

=== 10x10 Filmmaker Challenge ===
Cheek is the founder and creator of 10x10 Filmmaker Challenge—a music video documentary project that "brings together 10 bands and 10 filmmakers to make a music video in less than a week." 10x10 has been featured at the Atlantic Film Festival from 2008 to 2014, the Adelaide Fringe Festival (Australia) in 2008, the Cucalorus Film Festival in 2011 and 2014, as well as a film festival in Canada.

== Music ==
=== Sex Police ===
In 1989, Cheek sang and played bass in the six-piece alternative rock band Sex Police, along with trumpeter Stacy Guess (Squirrel Nut Zippers), drummer Jody Maxwell, vocalist/guitarist John Plymale (Pressure Boys), and trumpeter Jay Widenhouse (Pressure Boys). In 1990, the Chapel Hill, North Carolina band won the national Snickers New Music Search, beating out the Gin Blossoms. In its first five years, Sex Police played 500 shows. Their sound was described as "hard-edged rock and gut-wrenching lyrics" or, since their lineup included horns, "Chicago meets Soundgarden."

In 1989, the North Carolina Department of Transportation denied the Sex Police's application to participate in the Adopt-A-Highway program, along with the KKK and a bra store. Cheek said, "We thought it would be sort of nice thing to be able to drive down the highway and have a sign to say Sex Police. It's also a good idea to clean up the highways.'

The Sex Police issued three albums before breaking up in 1995: Medallion (1991), Second String (1992), and Science (1994). Cheek says, "We all mutually agreed, let's stop while we're still friends, and while we still love music." In 2014, the band released a DVD and CD of their live performance from New Year's Eve 1992.

=== manChild ===
Cheek played drums in the band manCHILD, along with college friend and Hollywood director Peyton Reed. Despite the duo living on opposites coasts, they managed to release two albums.

=== Cardinal Family Singers ===
Cheek sings lead vocals and plays guitars and horns in the modern indie rock band Cardinal Family Singers, which also includes Peyton Reed on drums. Other members have varied over the years, including drummer Derek "Knuckles" Brown (Eels), Mac McCaughan (Superchunk), and guitarist Mike Sawitzke (Eels). In addition to Reed, the current lineup is Lydia Hyslop on keyboard/vocals, Bill Ladd on guitar, and Jon Treneff on drums.

Cheek says, "We are all artists trying to do something new, trying to entertain and challenge ourselves and our friends." In 2019, Cheek and Reed returned to the recording studio in Los Angeles to record their new songs. The band has three prior albums, Lost and Found at Sea (2005), This is What We Did (2011), and Tilter (2015). Their instrumental song "Tilting Scale" is featured in the movie Ant-Man and the Wasp.

== Discography ==
=== Sex Police ===
- 1991 – Medallion (Battered Breath Productions)
- 1992 – Second String (Scuff Cakes)
- 1994 – Science (Scuff Cakes)
- 2014 – Oh, You Lock Music? / Oh, You Lock Video? (DVD/CD, Scuff Cakes)

=== manCHILD ===
- 1994

=== Cardinal Family Singers ===
- 2005 – Lost and Found at Sea (He's No Good to Me Dead/Self-Released)
- 2011 –This Is What We Did (NC Records)
- 2015 – Tilter
