= Mel Gibson (basketball) =

American basketball player and coach

Personal information
- Born: December 30, 1940 (age 85) Cordova, North Carolina, U.S.
- Listed height: 6 ft 3 in (1.91 m)
- Listed weight: 180 lb (82 kg)

Career information
- High school: Rockingham High School (Richmond County, North Carolina)
- College: Western Carolina (1959–1963)
- NBA draft: 1963: 2nd round, 16th overall pick
- Drafted by: Los Angeles Lakers
- Playing career: 1963–1964
- Position: Guard
- Number: 15
- Coaching career: 1967–1986

Career history

Playing
- 1963: Los Angeles Lakers
- 1963–1964: Wilmington Blue Bombers

Coaching
- 1967–1971: Charleston Southern
- 1972–1986: UNC Wilmington
- Stats at NBA.com
- Stats at Basketball Reference
Medals
Men's basketball
Representing United States
Pan American Games
Gold medal – first place	1963 São Paulo	Team Competition

Melvin Lee Gibson (born December 30, 1940) is an American retired basketball player and coach. The 6'3" and 180 lb former Western Carolina University guard played a single season in the National Basketball Association (NBA) with the Los Angeles Lakers in 1963–64, in which he appeared in nine games and recorded a total of 13 points. He played for the U.S. men's team at the 1963 FIBA World Championship. Gibson served as the head men's basketball coach at Charleston Southern University from 1967 to 1971 and the University of North Carolina at Wilmington (UNC Wilmington) from 1972 to 1986.

== NBA career statistics ==
Legend
GP	Games played	GS	Games started	MPG	Minutes per game
FG%	Field goal percentage	3P%	3-point field goal percentage	FT%	Free throw percentage
RPG	Rebounds per game	APG	Assists per game	SPG	Steals per game
BPG	Blocks per game	PPG	Points per game	**Bold**	Career high

=== Regular season ===
Year	Team	GP	MPG	FG%	FT%	RPG	APG	PPG
1963–64	L.A. Lakers	9	5.9	.300	.500	.4	.7	1.4
