= John Settle =

American football player and coach (born 1965)

Current position
- Title: Running backs coach
- Team: Rice
- Conference: AAC

Biographical details
- Born: June 2, 1965 (age 61); Reidsville, North Carolina, U.S.
- Education: Appalachian State University

Playing career
- 1980–1982: Rockingham County HS (NC)
- 1983–1986: Appalachian State
- 1987–1990: Atlanta Falcons
- 1991–1992: Washington Redskins
- 1994: Shreveport Pirates
- Position: Running back

Coaching career (HC unless noted)
- 1994: Appalachian State (RB)
- 1995: Cleveland Browns (OA)
- 1996–1997: Baltimore Ravens (OA)
- 1998–2005: Fresno State (RB)
- 2006–2010: Wisconsin (RB)
- 2011–2012: Carolina Panthers (RB)
- 2013: Cleveland Browns (RB)
- 2014: Pittsburgh (RB)
- 2015–2020: Wisconsin (RB)
- 2021–2022: Kentucky (co-ST/RB)
- 2023–present: Rice (RB)

Accomplishments and honors

Championships
- As a player: Super Bowl champion (XXVI)

Awards
- As a player: Pro Bowl (1988); Appalachian State Mountaineers No. 23 retired

John R. Settle (born June 2, 1965) is an American football coach and former player. He is the running backs coach for Rice University, a position he has held since 2023. He played professionally as a running back in the National Football League (NFL). Settle attended Rockingham County High School in Reidsville, North Carolina. He played college football for the Appalachian State Mountaineers and was signed as an undrafted free agent by the Atlanta Falcons, where he played from 1987 to 1990, and later for the Washington Redskins in his next two seasons where he won a Super Bowl.

During the 1988 season, he was selected to the Pro Bowl after rushing for a career-high 1,024 yards and 7 touchdowns. He was the first undrafted running back in NFL history to rush for over 1,000 yards in a season. Settle was a founding member of the Pi Nu chapter of Alpha Phi Alpha fraternity.

== College statistics ==
| Season | Team | Rushing | | | |
| Season | Team | TD | Att | Yds | Avg |
|---|---|---|---|---|---|
| 1983 | Appalachian State | 4 | 135 | 613 | 4.5 |
| 1984 | Appalachian State | 5 | 185 | 795 | 4.2 |
| 1985 | Appalachian State | 14 | 254 | 1,340 | 5.2 |
| 1986 | Appalachian State | 20 | 317 | 1,661 | 5.2 |
| Career | | 43 | 891 | 4,009 | 4.4 |

== NFL playing career ==
Settle signed with the Atlanta Falcons as an undrafted free agent in 1987 and played six seasons in the NFL. In his first four with Atlanta from 1987 to 1990, he was named to a Pro Bowl selection in 1988, when he accumulated 1,594 yards of offense (1,024 rushing and 570 receiving) and became the first undrafted free agent in NFL history to rush for 1,000 yards in a season. His final two seasons he spent in Washington where he played for Washington's Super Bowl-winning team in 1991.

== Coaching career ==
John began his coaching career at his alma mater in 1994 serving as the team's running backs coach. Settle had a three-year stint coaching in the NFL as an offensive assistant from 1995-1997 with the Cleveland Browns and the Baltimore Ravens (when they moved) under head coaches Bill Belichick and Ted Marchibroda. Settle then coached running backs at Fresno State from 1998–2005, where he tutored six 1,000-yard rushers. Some of the players he coached included: Jaime Kimbrough, Paris Gaines, Derrick Ward, Rodney Davis, Dwayne Wright, Bryson Sumlin, and Wendell Mathis. In 2006 he took the job as running backs coach at Wisconsin where he coached until 2010 when he once again returned to the NFL. In 2011 and 2012 John was the running backs coach in Carolina for the Panthers. In 2013 he returned to Cleveland and was the Browns running backs coach. In 2014 he returned to coaching collegiately at Pitt where he coached James Conner to 2014 ACC Player of the Year honors. He then returned to Wisconsin under head coach Paul Chryst and coached the running backs there from 2015 to 2020. Some of the players he coached included: Corey Clement, Dare Ogunbowale, Jonathan Taylor. In 2021 John went to the SEC to coach at Kentucky as the team's running backs coach and co special teams coordinator. After leaving Kentucky, in March 2023 Settle was named the running backs coach at Rice.

== Personal life ==
He and his wife, Karen, have three children.
