= Reidsville High School =

American public school in North Carolina

Location
- 1901 South Park Drive; Reidsville, North Carolina 27320; United States; 36°19′41″N 79°40′56″W

Information
- Type: Public high school
- Established: 1923 (103 years ago)
- School district: Rockingham County Schools
- CEEB code: 343282
- Principal: Erica Blackwell
- Teaching staff: 49.00 (FTE)
- Grades: 9–12
- Gender: Co-Educational
- Enrollment: 760 (2023–2024)
- Student to teacher ratio: 15.51
- Colors: Navy blue and gold
- Athletics: Basketball, Soccer, Baseball, Cross Country, Football, Golf, Volleyball, Softball, Tennis, Swimming, Wrestling, Track and Field
- Athletics conference: North Carolina High School Athletic Association (NCHSAA)
- Mascot: Ramsey the Ram
- Nickname: Rams
- Rival: Rockingham County High School, Morehead High School
- Website: www.rock.k12.nc.us/o/rhs

Reidsville High School is a public high school located in Reidsville, North Carolina, serving students in the ninth through twelfth grade. It is in the Rockingham County Schools school district.

== History ==
Reidsville High School was established in 1923, with the construction of the former Reidsville High School. The location of the current school opened in 1960, as Reidsville Senior High School. In 1999, the school name was changed to Reidsville High School.

== Football team ==
Reidsville High School's football team have won 21 state championships, the most of any high school in North Carolina.

NCHSAA Football State Championships
Year	Classification	Title Number
1930	B	1
1931	B	2
1932	B	3
1937	B	4
1939	B	5
1940	B	6
1943	A	7
1945	A	8
1950	AA	9
1954	AA	10
2002	2AA	11
2003	2AA	12
2007	2AA	13
2008	2AA	14
2009	2AA	15
2016	2A	16
2018	2A	17
2019	2A	18
2020-21	2A	19
2023	2A	20
2025	4A	21

== Notable alumni ==
- Scott Bankhead, former MLB pitcher; silver medalist in men's baseball at the 1984 Summer Olympics
- Winford W. Barrow, former U.S. Coast Guard rear admiral
- Na Brown, former NFL wide receiver
- Jim Duncan, former NFL defensive end, college coach, and Canadian Football League coach
- Mike Goodes, professional golfer
- R. Stephen Ritchie, U.S. Air Force officer
- Nick Sacrinty, former NFL quarterback
- Jerome Simpson, former NFL wide receiver
- Melvin Watkins, college basketball coach
