= USCGC Spencer =

The following ships of the United States Coast Guard have borne the name USCGC Spencer;

- USCGC Spencer (WPG-36), a Treasury-class cutter in service from 1937 to 1974
- USCGC Spencer (WMEC-905), a medium endurance cutter that entered service in 1986
