= USS Mistletoe (WAGL-237) =

History
- Name: USCGC Mistletoe
- Completed: 1939
- Commissioned: November 1941
- Decommissioned: N/A
- Reclassified: From WAGL-237 to WLM-237 (1966)

General characteristics
- Displacement: 770 tons
- Length: 173 ft
- Beam: 32 ft
- Draft: 11 ft
- Speed: 11 knots
- Complement: 29
- Armament: 1 x 3 in

The third USCGC Mistletoe, originally designed for duty with the Lighthouse Service as a buoy tender, was built in 1939 by the Marine Iron & Shipbuilding Company, Duluth, Minnesota. As the Lighthouse Service became part of the U.S. Coast Guard in 1939, Mistletoe commissioned as a Coast Guard coastal buoy tender.

== Service history ==
Mistletoe's prewar operations were out of Gloucester, New Jersey and Portsmouth, Virginia. She transferred to the U.S. Navy 1 November 1941 in accordance with Executive Order 8929. Until 1 January 1946 she served as a coastal buoy tender in the Hampton Roads area.

Executive Order No. 9666 dated 28 December 1945 returned Mistletoe to the Treasury Department. In 1966 she was redesignated WLM‑237. She continued coastal buoy tender operations out of Gloucester City and Portsmouth into 1969.
