= 2026 Appalachian State Mountaineers football team =

American college football season

2026 Appalachian State Mountaineers football
- Conference: Sun Belt Conference
- East Division
- Record: 7–4 (4–3 Sun Belt)
- Head coach: Dowell Loggains (2nd season)
- Offensive coordinator: Mike Anthony (1st season)
- Offensive scheme: Multiple
- Defensive coordinator: D. J. Smith (2nd season)
- Base defense: Multiple 4–2–5
- Home stadium: Kidd Brewer Stadium

2026 Sun Belt Conference football standings
	Conf.			Overall
Team	W		L	W		L
East Division
Georgia Southern	6	–	1	7	–	4
James Madison	5	–	2	8	–	3
Appalachian State	4	–	3	7	–	4
Coastal Carolina	3	–	4	4	–	7
Marshall	3	–	4	6	–	5
Georgia State	2	–	5	5	–	6
Old Dominion	2	–	5	3	–	8
West Division
Louisiana Tech xy	7	–	0	9	–	2
Louisiana	5	–	2	8	–	3
South Alabama	4	–	3	6	–	5
Arkansas State	2	–	5	4	–	7
Troy	2	–	5	4	–	7
Southern Miss	2	–	5	3	–	8
Louisiana–Monroe	2	–	5	2	–	9
Championship: TBD vs. Louisiana Tech
$ – Conference champion; x – Division champion/co-champions; y – Championship game participant; As of November 22, 2026; Rankings from AP poll

The 2026 Appalachian State Mountaineers football team represents Appalachian State University in the Sun Belt Conference's East Division during the 2026 NCAA Division I FBS football season. The Mountaineers are led by Dowell Loggains in his second year as the head coach. The Mountaineers play home games at the Kidd Brewer Stadium, located in Boone, North Carolina.

== Offseason ==
=== Transfers ===
==== Outgoing ====
Player	Position	New school
Khalifa Keith	RB	Alabama
Saint Farrior	DL	Auburn
William Fowles	WR	Austin Peay
Matthew Wilson	QB	Austin Peay
Gabe Funk	OT	Bowling Green
Jose Leon	WR	Bryant
Khamani Alexander	RB	Charlotte
Jaden Barnes	WR	Charlotte
Emory Floyd	CB	Colorado
Dylan Manuel	DL	Colorado
Elijah Mc-Cantos	CB	Colorado State
Zyeir Gamble	S	East Carolina
Kanen Hamlett	TE	East Carolina
Cristian Conyer	CB	Eastern Kentucky
Kaleb Neal	S	Eastern Kentucky
J. J. Kohl	QB	FIU
Brayshawn Littlejohn	LB	FIU
AJ Mebane	EDGE	Gardner–Webb
Tyshawn Sanders	CB	Gardner–Webb
AJ Swann	QB	Mississippi State
Davion Dozier	WR	NC State
Jaylon Calhoun	RB	North Alabama
KJ Liles	DL	North Carolina Central
Dominic De Freitas	K	North Texas
Jacob Poff	LS	North Texas
Ian Ratliff	P	North Texas
Bucci Farmer	DL	Old Dominion
Jackson Moore	K	Ole Miss
Felix Doege	IOL	Rhode Island
Rondo Porter	DL	Rutgers
Denell Nix	IOL	Sam Houston
Marquis Lane-Owens	LB	South Carolina State
DJ Burks	DB	Tennessee
Thomas Davis	EDGE	Tulsa
Griffin Scroggs	IOL	UNLV
Zahn Coakley	WR	UTSA
Jayden Bethea	LB	Valdosta State
Ja'Torian Mack	S	Western Carolina
DeNigel Cooper	EDGE	Wisconsin
Moritz Schmoranzer	OT	Wofford
Mitch Lake	P	Unknown
Chris Lawson Jr.	WR	Unknown
Ashton Parker	CB	Unknown

==== Incoming ====
Player	Position	Previous school
Kamron Burris	OT	Anderson
Zach Taylor	WR	Arkansas
Ja'Quez Cross	RB	Arkansas State
Jaxson Dunn	P	Arkansas State
Semaj Fleming	WR	Boston College
Dazmin James	WR	California
Cary Grant	S	Charlotte
Josh Williams	CB	Dayton
Ki'Shawn Harvey	DL	East Tennessee State
Kevin Henderson	LB	Findlay
Devon Manuel	OT	Florida
Treyaun Webb	RB	Florida
Luke Douglas	TE	Florida State
Chris Lofton	WR	Gardner–Webb
J'Marion Burnette	RB	Houston
Greydon Grimes	OT	Kansas
Tommy Ulatowski	QB	Kent State
Devin Henderson	S	Liberty
Darrin Fugitt	TE	Lindenwood
Alex Mitchell	LB	Middle Tennessee
Khalil Conley	CB	North Carolina
Eric Adams	S	North Carolina Central
Siolaa Lolohea	DL	Oklahoma
Keshawn Thomas	LB	Old Dominion
James London	K	Pittsburgh
Malachi Singleton	QB	Purdue
Sam Pickett III	WR	Samford
Carson Sloan	LB	Samford
Mac Walters	OT	South Carolina
Jehchys Brown	DL	Southeast Missouri State
Kaleb Purdy	S	Tennessee Tech
Aaron Clark	DL	Towson
Parker Stone	LS	Tulsa
Jakob Gude	S	UCF
Ja'Cari Henderson	CB	UCF
Henry Hasselbeck	QB	UCLA
Dre Walker	CB	Virginia
Joseph Reddish	CB	Virginia Tech

=== Coaching staff additions ===
Name	New Position	Previous Team	Previous Position	Source
Ryan Pugh	Offensive line	Abilene Christian	Offensive line	
Tyler Zielenske	Special teams coordinator	Samford	Special teams coordinator/recruiting coordinator	
Tyler Kelley	Running backs	Tulane	Offensive analyst/recruiting specialist	
Justin Harper	Wide receivers	James Madison	Wide receivers	
Mike Anthony	Offensive coordinator	South Carolina	Assistant quarterbacks	

== Preseason ==
=== Media poll ===
In the Sun Belt preseason coaches' poll, the Mountaineers were picked to finish sixth place in the East division.

Defensive lineman Aiden Benton and linebacker Colton Phares were awarded to be in the preseason All-Sun Belt first team defense, respectively. Offensive lineman Tyriq Poindexter was selected as a member of the preseason All-Sun Belt second team offense.

== Schedule ==
Date	Time	Opponent	Site	TV	Result	Attendance
September 5	3:30 p.m.	Maine*	Kidd Brewer Stadium; Boone, NC	ESPN+	W 55–3	33,664
September 12	12:00 p.m.	at East Carolina*	Dowdy–Ficklen Stadium; Greenville, NC	ESPNU	W 27–24	40,074
September 19	6:00 p.m.	Charlotte*	Kidd Brewer Stadium; Boone, NC	ESPN+	W 26–21	28,296
September 26	7:30 p.m.	at NC State*	Carter–Finley Stadium; Raleigh, NC	ESPNU	L 31–41	56,919
October 10	1:00 p.m.	Old Dominion^{†}	Kidd Brewer Stadium; Boone, NC	ESPN+	L 3–10	27,011
October 16	8:00 p.m.	at Coastal Carolina	Brooks Stadium; Conway, SC (rivalry)	ESPN2	W 35–32	19,485
October 22	7:00 p.m.	James Madison	Kidd Brewer Stadium; Boone, NC	ESPNU	W 34–31 ^{OT}	33,322
October 31	6:30 p.m.	at Georgia Southern	Paulson Stadium; Statesboro, GA (Deeper Than Hate)	ESPN+	L 3–19	22,832
November 7	2:30 p.m.	Georgia State	Kidd Brewer Stadium; Boone, NC	ESPN+	L 23–39	31,944
November 14	6:00 p.m.	at Marshall	Joan C. Edwards Stadium; Huntington, WV (The Old Mountain Feud)	ESPN+	W 20–16	23,675
November 21	2:30 p.m.	Louisiana–Monroe	Kidd Brewer Stadium; Boone, NC	ESPN+	W 17–16 ^{OT}	28,624
November 27	3:00 p.m.	at South Alabama	Hancock Whitney Stadium; Mobile, AL	ESPN+		
*Non-conference game; ^{†}Homecoming; All times are in Eastern time

== Game summaries ==
=== Maine (FCS) ===
Maine Black Bears (FCS) (1–0) at Appalachian State Mountaineers (0–0) – Game summary

Quarter	1	2	3	4	Total
Black Bears (FCS)	0	0	3	0	3
Mountaineers	7	24	7	17	55

at Kidd Brewer Stadium • Boone, North Carolina

- Date: September 5
- Game time: 3:30 p.m.
- Game weather: Cloudy
- Game attendance: 33,664
- Referee: Scott Broadway
- TV: ESPN+

Game information

First quarter

- (6:10) APP – Treyaun Webb 2-yard run, James London kick (Drive: 4 plays, 78 yards, 1:26; Appalachian State 7–0)

Second quarter

- (14:15) APP – James London 31-yard field goal (Drive: 10 plays, 74 yards, 5:21; Appalachian State 10–0)
- (9:32) APP – Darrin Fugitt 5-yard pass from Malachi Singleton, James London kick (Drive: 6 plays, 70 yards, 3:04; Appalachian State 17–0)
- (4:18) APP – Sam Pickett III 14-yard pass from Malachi Singleton, James London kick (Drive: 8 plays, 40 yards, 4:24; Appalachian State 24–0)
- (0:07) APP – Sam Pickett III 7-yard pass from Malachi Singleton, James London kick (Drive: 6 plays, 55 yards, 1:03; Appalachian State 31–0)

Third quarter

- (9:14) APP – Jaquari Lewis 12-yard run, James London kick (Drive: 7 plays, 69 yards, 2:38; Appalachian State 38–0)
- (0:51) ME – Samuel Tremblay 40-yard field goal (Drive: 18 plays, 52 yards, 8:23; Appalachian State 38–3)

Fourth quarter

- (13:25) APP – Nate Branch 36-yard run, James London kick (Drive: 8 plays, 75 yards, 2:26; Appalachian State 45–3)
- (10:33) APP – Jackson Grier 28-yard run, Andrew Cummings kick (Drive: 3 plays, 68 yards, 1:16; Appalachian State 52–3)
- (2:12) APP – James London 32-yard field goal (Drive: 11 plays, 56 yards, 5:45; Appalachian State 55–3)

Statistics	ME	APP
First downs	12	34
Plays–yards	60–250	72–647
Rushes–yards	28–52	39–299
Passing yards	198	348
Passing: comp–att–int	18–32–2	29–33–0
Turnovers	2	1
Time of possession	26:51	33:09

Team	Category	Player	Statistics
Maine	Passing	Eddie Buehler	18/32, 198 yards, 2 INT
Maine	Rushing	Rashawn Marshall	13 carries, 37 yards
Maine	Receiving	Corey Rideout	1 reception, 47 yards
Appalachian State	Passing	Malachi Singleton	22/24, 291 yards, 3 TD
Appalachian State	Rushing	Jaquari Lewis	11 carries, 69 yards, TD
Appalachian State	Receiving	Sam Pickett III	5 receptions, 76 yards, 2 TD

=== at East Carolina ===
Appalachian State Mountaineers (1–0) at East Carolina Pirates (0–1) – Game summary

Quarter	1	2	3	4	Total
Mountaineers	3	14	10	0	27
Pirates	7	3	7	7	24

at Dowdy–Ficklen Stadium • Greenville, North Carolina

- Date: September 12
- Game time: 12:00 p.m.
- Game weather: Cloudy • Temperature: 86 °F (30 °C)
- Game attendance: 40,074
- Referee: Edwin Lee
- TV announcers (ESPNU): Tiffany Greene and Jay Walker

Game information

First quarter

- (4:11) ECU – Michael Allen 2-yard run, Noah Perez kick (Drive: 8 plays, 83 yards, 2:57; East Carolina 7–0)
- (0:44) APP – James London 41-yard field goal (Drive: 7 plays, 44 yards, 3:22; East Carolina 7–3)

Second quarter

- (14:17) APP – Malachi Singleton 4-yard run, James London kick (Drive: 4 plays, 12 yards, 1:18; Appalachian State 10–7)
- (8:44) APP – Jaquari Lewis 10-yard run, James London kick (Drive: 7 plays, 83 yards, 3:51; Appalachian State 17–7)
- (1:21) ECU – Noah Perez 33-yard field goal (Drive: 7 plays, 60 yards, 2:11; Appalachian State 17–10)

Third quarter

- (12:12) APP – Treyaun Webb 13-yard run, James London kick (Drive: 7 plays, 80 yards, 2:45; Appalachian State 24–10)
- (10:36) ECU – Jason Dickerson 61-yard pass from Mitch Griffis, Noah Perez kick (Drive: 5 plays, 75 yards, 1:36; Appalachian State 24–17)
- (3:57) APP – James London 34-yard field goal (Drive: 4 plays, 6 yards, 2:03; Appalachian State 27–17)

Fourth quarter

- (0:21) ECU – Ja'Keith Hamilton 7-yard pass from Mitch Griffis, Noah Perez kick (Drive: 9 plays, 60 yards, 1:35; Appalachian State 27–24)

Statistics	APP	ECU
First downs	21	22
Plays–yards	72–396	72–417
Rushes–yards	44–128	35–187
Passing yards	267	230
Passing: comp–att–int	20–28–0	21–37–1
Turnovers	0	2
Time of possession	36:06	23:54

Team	Category	Player	Statistics
Appalachian State	Passing	Malachi Singleton	20/28, 267 yards
Appalachian State	Rushing	Jaquari Lewis	17 carries, 73 yards, TD
Appalachian State	Receiving	Sam Pickett III	4 receptions, 86 yards
East Carolina	Passing	Mitch Griffis	21/37, 230 yards, 2 TD, INT
East Carolina	Rushing	Ashton Gray	16 carries, 99 yards
East Carolina	Receiving	Jeremiah Melvin	7 receptions, 94 yards

=== Charlotte ===
Charlotte 49ers (0–2) at Appalachian State Mountaineers (2–0) – Game summary

Quarter	1	2	3	4	Total
49ers	0	7	0	14	21
Mountaineers	3	10	6	7	26

at Kidd Brewer Stadium • Boone, North Carolina

- Date: September 19
- Game time: 6:00 p.m.
- Game weather: Cloudy
- Game attendance: 28,296
- Referee: Reid Jackson
- TV announcers (ESPN+): David Jackson (play-by-play) and Avery Hall (analyst)

Game information

First quarter

- (9:50) APP – James Landon 41-yard field goal (Drive: 6 plays, 41 yards, 2:00; Appalachian State 3–0)

Second quarter

- (4:34) APP – Jaquari Lewis 2-yard run, James London kick (Drive: 14 plays, 74 yards, 6:52; Appalachian State 10–0)
- (0:35) CLT – Khamani Alexander 1-yard run, Ian Kelly kick (Drive: 8 plays, 68 yards, 1:11; Appalachian State 10–7
- (0:00) APP – James London 47-yard field goal (Drive: 5 plays, 46 yards, 0:35; Appalachian State 13–7)

Third quarter

- (4:28) APP – Chris Lofton 3-yard pass from Malachi Singleton, two-point pass conversion failed (Drive: 4 plays, 27 yards, 2:02; Appalachian State 19–7)

Fourth quarter

- (12:08) APP – Jackson Grier 7-yard pass from Malachi Singleton, James London kick (Drive: 12 plays, 74 yards, 4:59; Appalachian State 26–7)
- (7:00) CLT – Khamani Alexander 1-yard run, Khamani Alexander two-point conversion run (Drive: 12 plays, 75 yards, 5:08; Appalachian State 26–15)
- (1:58) CLT – Collin Gill 36-yard interception return, two-point pass conversion failed (Drive: 3 plays, -5 yards, 0:19; Appalachian State 26–21)

Statistics	CLT	APP
First downs	15	22
Plays–yards	60-247	76-435
Rushes–yards	25-36	33-90
Passing yards	211	345
Passing: comp–att–int	22-35-2	29-43-1
Time of possession	26:32	33:28

Team	Category	Player	Statistics
Charlotte	Passing	Cole Gonzales	22/35, 211 yards, 2 INTs
Charlotte	Rushing	Henry Rutledge	7 carries, 29 yards
Charlotte	Receiving	Jaden Barnes	10 receptions, 97 yards
Appalachian State	Passing	Malachi Singleton	28/42, 331 yards, 2 TDs, INT
Appalachian State	Rushing	Jaquari Lewis	11 carries, 46 yards, TD
Appalachian State	Receiving	Chris Lofton	6 receptions, 90 yards, TD

=== at NC State ===
Appalachian State Mountaineers (3–0) at NC State Wolfpack (1–2) – Game summary

Quarter	1	2	3	4	Total
Mountaineers	0	10	7	14	31
Wolfpack	14	14	3	10	41

at Carter–Finley Stadium • Raleigh, North Carolina

- Date: September 26
- Game time: 7:30 p.m.
- Game attendance: 56,919
- TV announcers (ESPNU): Jason Ross Jr. and Tyoka Jackson

Game information

First quarter

- (10:31) NCSU – CJ Bailey 5-yard run, Kanoah Vinesett kick (Drive: 10 plays, 75 yards, 4:29; NC State 7–0)
- (0:05) NCSU – Jayden Scott 9-yard run, Kanoah Vinesett kick (Drive: 7 plays, 60 yards, 3:44; NC State 14–0)

Second quarter

- (8:34) NCSU – Ashton Locklear 10-yard pass, Kanoah Vinesett kick (Drive: 9 plays, 61 yards, 4:19; NC State 21–0)
- (6:07) APP – Malachai Singleton 3-yard pass, James London kick (Drive: 5 plays, 75 yards, 2:27; NC State 21–7)
- (0:39) NCSU – Keenan Jackson 17-yard pass, Kanoah Vinesett kick (Drive: 8 plays, 69 yards, 1:39; NC State 28–7)
- (0:00) APP – James London kick 48-yard field goal (Drive: 6 plays, 45 yards, 0:39; NC State 28–10)

Third quarter

- (11:18) APP – Jaquari Lewis 2-yard, James London kick (Drive: 8 plays, 75 yards, 3:43; NC State 28–17)
- (4:33) NCSU – Kanoah Vinesett 23-yard field goal (Drive: 13 plays, 69 yards, 6:45; NC State 32–17)

Fourth quarter

- (11:28) APP – Sam Pickett III 18-yard pass, James London kick (Drive: 5 plays, 42 yards, 2:16; NC State 31–24)
- (9:41) APP – Gavin Barber 9-yard pass, James London kick (Drive: 4 plays, 36 yards, 1:44; NC State 31–31)
- (5:08) NSCU – Jayden Scott 16-yard pass, Kanoah Vinesett kick (Drive: 9 plays, 75 yards, 4:33; NC State 38–31)
- (1:51) NCSU – Kanoah Vinesett 35-yard field goal (Drive: 8 plays, 15 yards, 2:08; NC State 41–31)

Statistics	APP	NCSU
First downs	18	26
Plays–yards	379	459
Rushes–yards	22–62	46–206
Passing yards	317	253
Passing: comp–att–int	26–39–0	24–33–1
Turnovers	0	1
Time of possession	23:37	36:23

Team	Category	Player	Statistics
Appalachian State	Passing	Malachi Singelton	26/28, 317 yards
Appalachian State	Rushing	Jaquari Lewis	8 carries, 32 yards, 1 TD
Appalachian State	Receiving	Sam Pickett III	5 receptions, 97 yards, 1 TD
NC State	Passing	CJ Bailey	23/33, 253 yards
NC State	Rushing	Jayden Scott	25 carries, 148 yards, 2 TD
NC State	Receiving	Keenan Jackson	4 receptions, 64 yards,

=== Old Dominion ===
Old Dominion Monarchs (1–4) at Appalachian State Mountaineers (3–1) – Game summary

Quarter	1	2	3	4	Total
Monarchs	0	0	2	8	10
Mountaineers	0	0	3	0	3

at Kidd Brewer Stadium • Boone, North Carolina

- Date: October 10

Statistics	ODU	APP
First downs		
Plays–yards		
Rushes–yards		
Passing yards		
Passing: comp–att–int		
Time of possession		

Team	Category	Player	Statistics
Old Dominion	Passing		
Old Dominion	Rushing		
Old Dominion	Receiving		
Appalachian State	Passing		
Appalachian State	Rushing		
Appalachian State	Receiving		

=== at Coastal Carolina (rivalry) ===
Appalachian State Mountaineers (3–2) at Coastal Carolina Chanticleers (2–4) – Game summary

Quarter	1	2	3	4	Total
Mountaineers	14	0	14	7	35
Chanticleers	7	17	0	8	32

at Brooks Stadium • Conway, South Carolina

- Date: October 16
- Game time: 8:00 p.m.

Statistics	APP	CCU
First downs		
Plays–yards		
Rushes–yards		
Passing yards		
Passing: comp–att–int		
Time of possession		

Team	Category	Player	Statistics
Appalachian State	Passing		
Appalachian State	Rushing		
Appalachian State	Receiving		
Coastal Carolina	Passing		
Coastal Carolina	Rushing		
Coastal Carolina	Receiving		

=== James Madison ===
James Madison Dukes (7–0) at Appalachian State Mountaineers (4–2) – Game summary

Quarter	1	2	3	4	OT	Total
Dukes	7	7	7	10	0	31
Mountaineers	0	10	3	18	3	34

at Kidd Brewer Stadium • Boone, North Carolina

- Date: October 22
- Game time: 7:00 p.m.
- Game attendance: 33,322
- TV: ESPN2

Game information

First quarter

- (11:33) JMU – George Pettaway 1-yard run, Morgan Suarez kick (Drive: 8 plays, 75 yards, 3:27; James Madison 7–0)

Second quarter

- (12:41) APP – James London 48-yard field goal (Drive: 6 plays, 50 yards, 3:27; James Madison 7–3)
- (4:48) JMU — Braeden Wisloski 70- yard pass, Morgan Suarez kick (Drive: 1 play, 70 yards, 3:27; James Madison 14–3)
- (1:02) APP – Alexander Sanchez 19-yard pass, James London kick (Drive: 10 plays, 75 yards, 3:46; James Madison 14–10)

Third quarter

- (10:06) APP – James London 27-yard field goal (Drive: 11 plays, 66 yards, 4:55; James Madison 14–13)
- (2:38) JMU – Cole Keller 19-yard pass, Morgan Suarez kick (Drive: 11 plays, 67 yards, 4:37; James Madison 21–13)

Fourth quarter

- (13:15) APP – Chris Lofton 5-yard pass, Sam Pickett III 2-point conversion (Drive: 10 plays, 75 yards, 4:23; Tied 21–21)
- (9:19) JMU – Morgan Suarez 47-yard field goal (Drive: 8 plays, 47 yards, 3:56; James Madison 24–21)
- (6:16) APP – James London 36-yard field goal (Drive: 7 plays, 57 yards, 3:03; Tied 24–24)
- (5:52) APP – Luke Douglas 4-yard pass, James London kick (Drive: 1 play, 50 14 yards, 0:11; Appalachian State 31–24)
- (0:03) JMU – Camden Coleman 6-yard run, Morgan Suarez kick (Drive: 15 plays, 71 yards, 2:52; Tied 31–31)

Overtime

- APP – James London 40-yard field goal (Drive: 3 plays, 3 yards; Appalachian State 34–31)

Statistics	JMU	APP
First downs	19	21
Plays–yards	27–46–1	29–44-0
Rushes–yards	30–92	31–81
Passing yards	331	285
Passing: comp–att–int	27–46–1	29–44–0
Time of possession	26:50	33:10

Team	Category	Player	Statistics
James Madison	Passing	Camden Coleman	22/39, 232 yards
James Madison	Rushing	George Pettaway	15 carries, 57 yards, TD
James Madison	Receiving	Braeden Wisloski	2 receptions, 84 yards, 1 TD
Appalachian State	Passing	Malachai Singleton	26/40, 271 yards
Appalachian State	Rushing	Jaquari Lewis	13 carries, 74 yards
Appalachian State	Receiving	Nate Branch	6 receptions, 73 yards

=== at Georgia Southern (Deeper Than Hate) ===
Appalachian State Mountaineers (5–2) at Georgia Southern Eagles (3–4) – Game summary

Quarter	1	2	3	4	Total
Mountaineers	0	0	0	0	0
Eagles	0	0	0	0	0

at Paulson Stadium • Statesboro, Georgia

- Date: October 31

Game information

First quarter
Second quarter
Third quarter
Fourth quarter

Statistics	APP	GASO
First downs		
Plays–yards		
Rushes–yards		
Passing yards		
Passing: comp–att–int		
Time of possession		

Team	Category	Player	Statistics
Appalachian State	Passing		
Appalachian State	Rushing		
Appalachian State	Receiving		
Georgia Southern	Passing		
Georgia Southern	Rushing		
Georgia Southern	Receiving		

=== Georgia State ===
Georgia State Panthers (4–4) at Appalachian State Mountaineers (5–3) – Game summary

Quarter	1	2	3	4	Total
Panthers	0	0	0	0	0
Mountaineers	0	0	0	0	0

at Kidd Brewer Stadium • Boone, North Carolina

- Date: November 7

Statistics	GAST	APP
First downs		
Plays–yards		
Rushes–yards		
Passing yards		
Passing: comp–att–int		
Time of possession		

Team	Category	Player	Statistics
Georgia State	Passing		
Georgia State	Rushing		
Georgia State	Receiving		
Appalachian State	Passing		
Appalachian State	Rushing		
Appalachian State	Receiving		

=== at Marshall (The Old Mountain Feud) ===
Appalachian State Mountaineers (5–4) at Marshall Thundering Herd (5–4) – Game summary

Quarter	1	2	3	4	Total
Mountaineers	0	0	0	0	0
Thundering Herd	0	0	0	0	0

at Joan C. Edwards Stadium • Huntington, West Virginia

- Date: November 14

Game information

First quarter
Second quarter
Third quarter
Fourth quarter

Statistics	APP	MRSH
First downs		
Plays–yards		
Rushes–yards		
Passing yards		
Passing: comp–att–int		
Time of possession		

Team	Category	Player	Statistics
Appalachian State	Passing		
Appalachian State	Rushing		
Appalachian State	Receiving		
Marshall	Passing		
Marshall	Rushing		
Marshall	Receiving		

=== Louisiana–Monroe ===
Louisiana–Monroe Warhawks (2–8) at Appalachian State Mountaineers (6–4) – Game summary

Quarter	1	2	3	4	Total
Warhawks	0	0	0	0	0
Mountaineers	0	0	0	0	0

at Kidd Brewer Stadium • Boone, North Carolina

- Date: November 21

Statistics	ULM	APP
First downs		
Plays–yards		
Rushes–yards		
Passing yards		
Passing: comp–att–int		
Time of possession		

Team	Category	Player	Statistics
Louisiana–Monroe	Passing		
Louisiana–Monroe	Rushing		
Louisiana–Monroe	Receiving		
Appalachian State	Passing		
Appalachian State	Rushing		
Appalachian State	Receiving		

=== at South Alabama ===
Appalachian State Mountaineers (7–4) at South Alabama Jaguars (6–5) – Game summary

Quarter	1	2	3	4	Total
Mountaineers	0	0	0	0	0
Jaguars	0	0	0	0	0

at Hancock Whitney Stadium • Mobile, Alabama

- Date: November 27
- Game time: 3:00 p.m.
- TV: ESPN+

Game information

First quarter
Second quarter
Third quarter
Fourth quarter

Statistics	APP	USA
First downs		
Plays–yards		
Rushes–yards		
Passing yards		
Passing: comp–att–int		
Time of possession		

Team	Category	Player	Statistics
Appalachian State	Passing		
Appalachian State	Rushing		
Appalachian State	Receiving		
South Alabama	Passing		
South Alabama	Rushing		
South Alabama	Receiving		

== Personnel ==
=== Roster ===
2026 Appalachian State Mountaineers football team roster
Players
Coaches
Offense

Pos.	#	Name	Class
WR	0	Sam Pickett III	So
RB	2	Kanye Roberts	Sr
QB	3	Malachi Singleton	Jr
RB	4	Treyaun Webb	Jr
RB	5	Jaquari Lewis	So
WR	6	Chris Lofton	Jr
TE	7	Darrin Fugitt	Sr
QB	8	Henry Hasselbeck	So
WR	9	Daz James	Jr
QB	10	Gregory Fee	Fr
QB	11	Noah Gillon	Fr
WR	12	Sam Mbake	Sr
WR	13	Jackson Grier	Jr
QB	15	Bronzden Chaffin	Fr
WR	16	Alex Sanchez	So
QB	17	Tommy Ulatowski	Sr
WR	18	Kamauri Austin	Fr
TE	19	Jamel Howse	Fr
RB	20	J'Marion Burnette	Jr
WR	22	Semaj Fleming	Fr
RB	31	Max Guest	Fr
RB	48	Jayson Angulo	Sr
OL	50	Eisa Evans	Fr
OL	52	Cayden Sweatt	Jr
OL	55	Ben Jones	Fr
OL	56	Jayden Thomas	So
OL	57	Devon Manuel	Sr
OL	63	Scottland Dover	Fr
OL	64	Jarvis Potts	Fr
OL	65	Mac Walters	Sr
OL	66	Danny Stevens	Jr
OL	67	Trent Ramsey	Sr
OL	68	Lance Williams	Jr
OL	70	Big Al Oliver	Fr
OL	72	Nick Kashubara	Fr
OL	74	Kamron Burris	Jr
OL	75	Greydon Grimes	So
OL	77	Daniel Davis	Jr
OL	78	Tyriq Poindexter	Sr
WR	80	Doopah Coleman	So
WR	81	Derick Brazil	So
WR	82	Zalin Ingram	So
WR	83	Ryan Morrison	So
TE	85	Luke Douglas	So
TE	87	Dillon Galloway	So
WR	89	Zach Taylor	So

Defense

Pos.	#	Name	Class
DB	0	Juan Berchal	So
DB	1	Ja'Den McBurrows	Jr
DB	3	Ja'Cari Henderson	Sr
DB	4	Jakob Gude	So
LB	5	Carson Sloan	Jr
DB	6	Khalil Conley	So
DB	7	Devin Henderson	So
DB	8	Dre Walker	Jr
DB	9	Ahmad Robinson	Sr
LB	10	Colton Phares	Jr
DB	12	Cary Grant	Sr
LB	13	Keshawn Thomas	Sr
LB	15	Alex Mitchell	Sr
LB	16	Kevin Henderson	Jr
DB	17	DaRon Wilson	So
DB	18	Syncere Berry	Fr
DL	19	Christian Waring	Fr
DB	20	Eric Adams	Jr
DB	21	Joe Reddish	Jr
LB	22	Bryant Junius	Fr
DB	24	Josh Williams	Jr
DB	25	Kaleb Purdy	Sr
DB	27	Cam Fleming	Jr
DB	30	Dorrian Medley	Fr
DL	33	Aiden Benton	Jr
LB	35	Brooks Yurachek	Jr
DB	36	Luke Lair	Sr
DB	39	Kavin White	So
DL	40	Keaton Braddock	Jr
DL	41	Caleb Sandstrom	Jr
DL	44	Manny Lewis	Fr
DL	45	Nick Campbell	Sr
DL	46	Nick Avery	Fr
LB	49	Randy Marion III	Jr
DL	50	Jehchys Brown	Jr
DL	51	Jackson Briley	So
LB	52	Michael McClenton	Fr
DL	58	Chris Doyle	Fr
DL	84	Sawyer Arnold	Fr
DL	88	Kaden Ellis	Fr
DL	94	Caleb Pitts	So
DL	95	Ki'Shawn Harvey	Jr
DL	97	Xavier Joseph	Fr
DL	98	Kelvin Crawford	Fr
DL	99	Aaron Clark	So
DB		Dylan Hasz	Sr

Special teams

Pos.	#	Name	Class
K	29	Carter Everett	Sr
LS	34	Parker Stone	Sr
P	40	Jaxson Dunn	So
K	83	James London	Jr

Head coach

- Dowell Loggains (Arkansas)

Coordinators/assistant coaches

- Clyde Christensen (North Carolina)
  Associate head coach
- Mike Anthony (Baylor)
  Offensive coordinator
- D. J. Smith (Appalachian State)
  Defensive coordinator/LB
- Tyler Zielenske (Mercer)
  Special teams coordinator
- Curtis Fuller (TCU)
  Defensive pass game coordinator/DB
- Anthony Shakir (Brevard)
  Defensive recruiting coordinator/Edges
- Aaron Fierbaugh (Auburn)
  Safeties
- Justin Harper (Virginia Tech)
  Wide receivers
- Antonio James (Illinois)
  Defensive line
- Tyler Kelley (Louisiana Tech)
  Running backs
- Ryan Pugh (Auburn)
  Offensive line
- Riley Watkins (Pittsburg State)
  Quarterbacks
- Ryan Yurachek (Marshall)
  Tight ends
- Will Flowers (Appalachian State)
  Offensive analyst

Legend

- (C) Team captain
- (S) Suspended
- (I) Ineligible
- Injured
- Redshirt

Roster
Last update: June 16, 2026
