= 2025 Appalachian State Mountaineers football team =

American college football season

2025 Appalachian State Mountaineers football

Birmingham Bowl, L 10–29 vs. Georgia Southern
- Conference: Sun Belt Conference
- East Division
- Record: 5–8 (2–6 Sun Belt)
- Head coach: Dowell Loggains (1st season)
- Offensive scheme: Multiple
- Defensive coordinator: D. J. Smith (1st season)
- Base defense: 4–3 or 4–2–5
- Home stadium: Kidd Brewer Stadium

2025 Sun Belt Conference football standings
	Conf.			Overall
Team	W		L	W		L
East Division
No. 19 James Madison xy$^	8	–	0	12	–	2
Old Dominion	6	–	2	10	–	3
Coastal Carolina	5	–	3	6	–	7
Georgia Southern	4	–	4	7	–	6
Marshall	3	–	5	5	–	7
Appalachian State	2	–	6	5	–	8
Georgia State	0	–	8	1	–	11
West Division
Troy xy	6	–	2	8	–	6
Southern Miss	5	–	3	7	–	6
Louisiana	5	–	3	6	–	7
Arkansas State	5	–	3	7	–	6
Texas State	3	–	5	7	–	6
South Alabama	3	–	5	4	–	8
Louisiana–Monroe	1	–	7	3	–	9
Championship: James Madison 31, Troy 14
^ – College Football Playoff participant; $ – Conference champion; x – Division champion/co-champions; y – Championship game participant; Rankings from AP Poll

The 2025 Appalachian State Mountaineers football team represented Appalachian State University in the Sun Belt Conference's East Division during the 2025 NCAA Division I FBS football season. The Mountaineers were led by Dowell Loggains in his first year as the head coach. The Mountaineers played home games at the Kidd Brewer Stadium, located in Boone, North Carolina.

== Offseason ==
=== Transfers ===
==== Outgoing ====
Player	Position	New school
Deshawn McKnight	DL	Arizona
Trenton Alan Yowe	DB	Arkansas State
Jason Hertz	DL	Charleston Southern
Josiah Wyatt	DL	Charleston Southern
Anderson Castle	RB	Duke
Reece Larson	WR	FIU
Anthony Rosier	LB	Florida A&M
Jalik Thomas	S	Florida A&M
Garrison Butler	DL	Furman
Blake Bradford	OT	Gardner–Webb
Cahari Haynes	LB	Gardner–Webb
Brendan Harrington	LB	Georgia Southern
Joshua Donald	DL	Houston
Kai Fernandes	S	Incarnate Word
Makai Jackson	WR	Indiana
Franklin Baret	WR	Jacksonville State
Markus Clark	DL	Liberty
Derrell Farrar	DL	Liberty
Austin Hobson	DL	Louisburg College (NJCAA)
Zavier Short	WR	Marshall
Nate Johnson	DE	Missouri
Andres Dewerk	OT	Ohio
Markell Samuel	OL	Oklahoma State
JT Sowell	IOL	Richmond
Jackson Bussey	EDGE	Samford
Trey Lenhardt	S	Samford
Joey Aguilar	QB	Tennessee
Dylan Barbrey	OT	The Citadel
Garner Langlo	OL	Troy
Jack Hollifield	OL	Tulane
Santana Hopper	DL	Tulane
Max Drag	TE	UCF
Kaedin Robinson	WR	Eligibility Waiver Denied
Cameron Estep	QB	UNC Pembroke
Michael DiPasquale	RB	UNC Pembroke
Thomas Shrader	OL	USF
Isaiah McGuffin	LB	UVA Wise
Jason Chambers	DB	West Virginia
Nick Taylor	CB	West Virginia
Avarion Cole	S	Western Kentucky
Grant Tucker	WR	Wofford
Ryan McKinnis	LB	Western Carolina
Michael Hetzel	WR	Unknown
Brodrick Gooch	LB	Unknown
Blake Hoban	WR	Unknown
Kanye Roberts	RB	Withdrawn
Shawn Collins	DE	Withdrawn
Jordan Favors	S	Withdrawn

==== Incoming ====
Player	Position	Previous school
Dylan Hasz	S	Arkansas
Davion Dozier	WR	Arkansas
Rashod Dubinion	RB	Arkansas
Brooks Yurachek	LB	Arkansas
Jaden Barnes	WR	Austin Peay
Jackson Grier	WR	Boise State
Trent Ramsey	OT	California
Dylan Manuel	DL	Charleston Southern
Joseph Bakhole	DE	Chattanooga
Garrison Butler	DL	Cincinnati
Cristian Conyer	DB	Coastal Carolina
Derick Brazil	DB	East Carolina
Nehemiah Chandler	S	Georgia Tech
Saint Farrior	DL	Hampton
J. J. Kohl	QB	Iowa State
Kavin White	DB	Lenoir-Rhyne
Jaelin Willis	LB	Lenoir-Rhyne
Izayah Cummings	TE	Louisville
AJ Swann	QB	LSU
Ian Ratliff	P	Marshall
Jaysen Angulo	LB	Methodist
Ja'Den McBurrows	CB	Michigan
Brayshawn Littlejohn	LB	Missouri
Shamarr Jackson	OL	New Mexico State
Malik Perry	EDGE	Pittsburg State
Moritz Schmoranzer	OT	Pittsburgh
Ahmad Robinson	CB	Prairie View A&M
Emory Floyd	CB	South Carolina
Rondarius Porter	DL	South Carolina
Ronnie Porter	LB	South Carolina
Joshua Acord	TE	Southern Utah
Caleb Sandstrom	EDGE	St. Thomas
Khalifa Keith	RB	Tennessee
Will Flowers	OL	Valdosta State
Tyriq Poindexter	OL	VMI
Cameren Fleming	S	Virginia Tech
Lance Williams	OL	Virginia Tech

=== Coaching staff additions ===
Name	New Position	Previous Team	Previous Position	Source
Dowell Loggains	Head coach	South Carolina	Offensive coordinator/Quarterbacks	
Ryan Yurachek	Tight Ends	South Carolina	Assistant tight ends	
Riley Watkins	Quarterbacks	South Carolina	Offensive graduate assistant	
Allen Mogridge	Offensive Line	Georgia Tech	Senior football advisor	
D. J. Smith	Defensive coordinator	Missouri	Co-defensive coordinator/Linebackers/Recruiting coordinator	
Curtis Fuller	Defensive Pass Game Coordinator/Defensive Backs	Coastal Carolina	Cornerbacks	
Kevin Higgins	Chief of Staff	Wake Forest	General Manager	
Anthony Shakir	Defensive Recruiting Coordinator/Edges	Ball State	Defensive line	
Keith Jones Jr.	Defensive Line	New England Patriots	Defensive coaching assistant	
Clyde Christensen	Associate head coach	North Carolina	Senior advisor	
Jeff Crosby	Special Teams Coordinator	Texas	Special teams analyst	
Aashon Larkins	Offensive Recruiting Coordinator/Running Backs	Dartmouth	Secondary	
Joe Dailey	Offensive assistant (1/1/2025-4/1/2025)	Hampton	Quarterbacks coach / Pass Game Coordinator	

== Preseason ==
=== Media poll ===
In the Sun Belt preseason coaches' poll, the Mountaineers were picked to finish third place in the East division.

Wide receiver Dalton Stroman was selected as a member of the preseason All-Sun Belt second team offense.

== Schedule ==
Date	Time	Opponent	Site	TV	Result	Attendance
August 29	7:00 p.m.	vs. Charlotte*	Bank of America Stadium; Charlotte, NC (Duke's Mayo Classic)	ESPNU	W 34–11	35,718
September 6	3:30 p.m.	Lindenwood*	Kidd Brewer Stadium; Boone, NC	ESPN+	W 20–13	34,921
September 13	7:00 p.m.	at Southern Miss	M. M. Roberts Stadium; Hattiesburg, MS	ESPN+	L 22–38	24,534
September 27	7:30 p.m.	at Boise State*	Albertsons Stadium; Boise, ID	FS1	L 14–47	32,904
October 4	3:30 p.m.	Oregon State*	Kidd Brewer Stadium; Boone, NC	ESPN+	W 27–23	35,021
October 11	3:30 p.m.	at Georgia State	Center Parc Stadium; Atlanta, GA	ESPN+	W 41–20	19,587
October 18	3:30 p.m.	Coastal Carolina^{†}	Kidd Brewer Stadium; Boone, NC (rivalry)	ESPN+	L 37–45	33,862
October 25	12:00 p.m.	at Old Dominion	S.B. Ballard Stadium; Norfolk, VA	ESPNU	L 21–24	18,097
November 6	7:30 p.m.	Georgia Southern	Kidd Brewer Stadium; Boone, NC (rivalry)	ESPN2	L 23–25	31,876
November 15	3:30 p.m.	at James Madison	Bridgeforth Stadium; Harrisonburg, VA	ESPN+	L 10–58	25,298
November 22	2:30 p.m.	Marshall	Kidd Brewer Stadium; Boone, NC (rivalry)	ESPN+	W 26–24	31,322
November 29	2:30 p.m.	Arkansas State	Kidd Brewer Stadium; Boone, NC	ESPN+	L 29–30	23,876
December 29	1:00 p.m.	vs. Georgia Southern*	Protective Stadium; Birmingham, AL (Birmingham Bowl)	ESPN	L 10–29	12,092
*Non-conference game; ^{†}Homecoming; All times are in Eastern time

== Game summaries ==
=== vs. Charlotte (Duke's Mayo Classic) ===
Appalachian State Mountaineers (0–0) vs. Charlotte 49ers (0–0) – Game summary

Quarter	1	2	3	4	Total
Mountaineers	0	17	10	7	34
49ers	3	0	0	8	11

at Bank of America Stadium • Charlotte, NC

- Date: August 29, 2025
- Game time: 7:00 p.m. EDT
- Game weather: Sunny • Temperature: 81 °F (27 °C) • Wind: S at 5 miles per hour (8.0 km/h)
- Game attendance: 35,718
- Referee: Scott Broadway
- TV announcers (ESPNU): Courtney Lyle (play-by-play) and Rene Ingoglia (analyst)

Game information

First quarter

- (1:21) CLT – Liam Boyd 42-yard field goal (Drive: 13 plays, 55 yards, 6:28; Charlotte 3–0)

Second quarter

- (8:38) APP – Rashod Dubinion 2-yard run, Dominic DeFreitas kick (Drive: 9 plays, 81 yards, 3:18; Appalachian State 7–3)
- (0:36) APP – Jaden Barnes 10-yard pass from AJ Swann, Dominic DeFreitas kick (Drive: 14 plays, 80 yards, 4:36; Appalachian State 14–3)
- (0:00) APP – Dominic DeFreitas 47-yard field goal (Drive: 5 plays, -16 yards, 0:23; Appalachian State 17–3)

Third quarter

- (10:22) APP – Dominic DeFreitas 35-yard field goal (Drive: 10 plays, 58 yards, 4:38; Appalachian State 20–3)
- (4:27) APP – Kanen Hamlett 19-yard pass from AJ Swann, Dominic DeFreitas kick (Drive: 11 plays, 73 yards, 4:16; Appalachian State 27–3)

Fourth quarter

- (10:25) CLT – E. Jai Mason 16-yard pass from Conner Harrell, Justin Olson-Gus McGee pass to Gus McGee for two-point conversion (Drive: 12 plays, 57 yards, 5:55; Appalachian State 27–11)
- (4:00) APP – Alex Sanchez 1-yard pass from AJ Swann, Dominic DeFreitas kick (Drive: 14 plays, 75 yards, 6:25; Appalachian State 34–11)

Statistics	APP	CLT
First downs	32	15
Plays–yards	88–586	54–218
Rushes–yards	38–182	29–76
Passing yards	404	142
Passing: comp–att–int	33–50–0	13–25–1
Turnovers	1	2
Time of possession	33:58	26:02

Team	Category	Player	Statistics
Appalachian State	Passing	AJ Swann	31/46, 368 yards, 3 TD
Appalachian State	Rushing	Rashod Dubinion	22 carries, 111 yards, TD
Appalachian State	Receiving	Jaden Barnes	6 receptions, 134 yards, TD
Charlotte	Passing	Conner Harrell	13/24, 142 yards, TD, INT
Charlotte	Rushing	CJ Stokes	15 carries, 49 yards
Charlotte	Receiving	Justin Olson	2 receptions, 56 yards

=== Lindenwood (FCS) ===
Lindenwood Lions (FCS) (0–1) at Appalachian State Mountaineers (1–0) – Game summary

Quarter	1	2	3	4	Total
Lions (FCS)	0	6	0	7	13
Mountaineers	14	0	3	3	20

at Kidd Brewer Stadium • Boone, NC

- Date: September 6, 2025
- Game time: 3:30 PM EDT
- Game weather: Cloudy • Temperature: 72 °F (22 °C) • Wind: E at 8 miles per hour (13 km/h)
- Game attendance: 34,921
- Referee: Jeremy Parker
- TV announcers (ESPN+): David Jackson (play-by-play) and Avery Hall (analyst)

Game information

First quarter

- APP – Dalton Stroman 72-yard pass from AJ Swann (Dominic De Freitas kick), 14:42. Mountaineers 7–0. Drive: 1 play, 72 yards, 0:11.
- APP – Jaden Barnes 13-yard pass from AJ Swann (Dominic De Freitas kick), 3:32. Mountaineers 14–0. Drive: 6 plays, 75 yards, 2:27.

Second quarter

- LIN – Nate Glantz 1-yard run (Will Graham kick BLOCKED), 7:15. Mountaineers 14–6. Drive: 8 plays, 54 yards, 4:31.

Third quarter

- APP – Dominic De Freitas 29-yard field goal, 5:36. Mountaineers 17–6. Drive: 12 plays, 67 yards, 4:31.

Fourth quarter

- APP – Dominic De Freitas 24-yard field goal, 14:12. Mountaineers 20–6. Drive: 11 plays, 61 yards, 4:06.
- LIN – Rico Bond 24-yard pass from Nate Glantz (Will Graham kick), 3:34. Mountaineers 20–13. Drive: 9 plays, 46 yards, 5:41.

Statistics	LIN	APP
First downs	13	20
Plays–yards	69–216	67–503
Rushes–yards	33–(-1)	33–209
Passing yards	217	294
Passing: Comp–Att–Int	20–36–2	19–34–1
Turnovers	2	4
Time of possession	35:08	24:52

Team	Category	Player	Statistics
Lindenwood	Passing	Nate Glantz	20/36, 217 yards, TD, 2 INT
Lindenwood	Rushing	Jared Rhodes	11 carries, 20 yards
Lindenwood	Receiving	Rico Bond	7 receptions, 102 yards, TD
Appalachian State	Passing	AJ Swann	19/34, 294 yards, 2 TD, INT
Appalachian State	Rushing	Rashod Dubinion	25 Carries, 194 yards
Appalachian State	Receiving	Dalton Stroman	3 receptions, 142 yards, TD

=== at Southern Miss ===
Appalachian State Mountaineers (2–0) at Southern Miss Golden Eagles (1–1) – Game summary

Quarter	1	2	3	4	Total
Mountaineers	7	0	7	8	22
Golden Eagles	7	10	7	14	38

at M. M. Roberts Stadium • Hattiesburg, MS

- Date: September 13, 2025
- Game time: 6:00 PM CDT
- Game weather: Sunny • Temperature: 89 °F (32 °C) • Wind: 3 mph
- Game attendance: 24,534
- Referee: Tim Barker
- TV announcers (ESPN+): Jason Baker (play-by-play) and Austin Davis (analyst)

Game information

First quarter

- (7:02) APP – Rashod Dubinion 2-yard run, Dominic De Freitas kick (Drive: 7 plays, 62 yards, 2:50; Appalachian State 7–0)
- (4:05) USM – Jeffery Pittman 5-yard run, Reed Harradine kick (Drive: 10 plays, 75 yards, 2:57; Tied 7–7)

Second quarter

- (14:09) USM – Reed Harradine 39-yard field goal (Drive: 9 plays, 52 yards, 3:42; Southern Miss 10–7)
- (10:40) USM – Ian Foster 99-yard interception return, Reed Harradine kick (Drive: 8 plays, 71 yards, 3:29; Southern Miss 17–7)

Third quarter

- (11:20) USM – Robert Briggs 8-yard pass form Braylon Braxton, Reed Harradine kick (Drive: 9 plays, 75 yards, 3:40; Southern Miss 24–7)
- (1:06) APP – Jaquari Lewis 10-yard run, Dominic De Freitas kick (Drive: 12 plays, 70 yards, 4:45; Southern Miss 24–14)

Fourth quarter

- (11:23) USM – Jeffery Pittman 9-yard run, Reed Harradine kick (Drive: 5 plays, 69 yards, 2:07; Southern Miss 31–14)
- (9:29) USM – Micah Davis 21-yard pass from Braylon Braxton, Reed Harradine kick (Drive: 3 plays, 61 yards, 0:54; Southern Miss 38–14)
- (0:51) APP – Jaden Barnes 3-yard pass from Billy Wiles, Jaquari Lewis two-point pass conversion (Drive: 9 plays, 70 yards, 3:19; Southern Miss 38–22)

Statistics	APP	USM
First downs	27	18
Plays–yards	90–470	56–389
Rushes–yards	38–95	25–110
Passing yards	375	279
Passing: Comp–Att–Int	31–52–3	22–31–1
Turnovers	3	1
Time of possession	36:36	23:24

Team	Category	Player	Statistics
Appalachian State	Passing	AJ Swann	15/23, 217 yards, 3 INT
Appalachian State	Rushing	Rashod Dubinion	24 carries, 95 yards, TD
Appalachian State	Receiving	Jaden Barnes	10 receptions, 132 yards, TD
Southern Miss	Passing	Braylon Braxton	22/30, 279 yards, 2 TD, INT
Southern Miss	Rushing	Jeffery Pittman	6 carries, 39 yards, 2 TD
Southern Miss	Receiving	Tychaun Chapman	4 receptions, 112 yards

=== at Boise State ===
Appalachian State Mountaineers (2–1) at Boise State Broncos (2–1) – Game summary

Quarter	1	2	3	4	Total
Mountaineers	0	7	7	0	14
Broncos	14	10	9	14	47

at Albertsons Stadium • Boise, ID

- Date: September 27, 2025
- Game time: 7:30 p.m. EDT
- Game weather: Sunny • Temperature: 81 °F (27 °C) • Wind: 7 mph
- Game attendance: 32,904
- Referee: Patrick Foy
- TV announcers (FS1): Noah Reed (play-by-play) and Robert Smith (analyst)

Game information

First quarter

- (9:49) BOIS – Latrell Caples 10-yard pass from Maddux Madsen, Colton Boomer kick (Drive: 10 plays, 75 yards, 5:11; Boise State 7–0)
- (1:49) BOIS – A'Marion McCoy 26-yard interception return, Colton Boomer kick (Boise State 14–0)

Second quarter

- (7:07) BOIS – Ben Ford 14-yard pass from Maddux Madsen, Colton Boomer kick (Drive: 10 plays, 80 yards, 5:53; Boise State 21–0)
- (1:16) APP – Dalton Stroman 7-yard pass from AJ Swann, Dominic De Freitas kick (Drive: 14 plays, 75 yards, 5:51; Boise State 21–7)
- (0:05) BOIS – Colton Boomer 25-yard field goal (Drive: 9 plays, 62 yards, 1:11; Boise State 24–7)

Third quarter

- (10:40) APP – Jaquari Lewis 3-yard run, Dominic De Freitas kick (Drive: 3 plays, 42 yards, 0:46; Boise State 24–14)
- (5:59) BOIS – Colton Boomer 40-yard field goal (Drive: 11 plays, 58 yards, 4:35; Boise State 27–14)
- (1:24) BOIS – Quinton Brown 29-yard pass from Maddux Madsen, two-point pass conversion attempt failed (Drive: 7 plays, 58 yards, 3:07; Boise State 33–14)

Fourth quarter

- (10:21) BOIS – Boen Phelps 33-yard interception return, Colton Boomer kick (Boise State 47–14)

Statistics	APP	BOIS
First downs	9	25
Plays–yards	57–184	82–473
Rushes–yards	29–119	44–152
Passing yards	65	321
Passing: Comp–Att–Int	12-28-3	25-38-0
Turnovers	4	0
Time of possession	21:50	38:10

Team	Category	Player	Statistics
Appalachian State	Passing	AJ Swann	11/24, 64 yards, TD, 2 INT
Appalachian State	Rushing	Rashod Dubinion	17 carries, 113 yards
Appalachian State	Receiving	Izayah Cummings	3 receptions, 20 yards
Boise State	Passing	Maddux Madsen	25/37, 321 yards, 4 TD
Boise State	Rushing	Sire Gaines	12 carries, 69 yards
Boise State	Receiving	Latrell Caples	5 receptions, 84 yards, 2 TD

=== Oregon State ===
Oregon State Beavers (0–5) at Appalachian State Mountaineers (2–2) – Game summary

Quarter	1	2	3	4	Total
Beavers	0	14	7	2	23
Mountaineers	17	0	10	0	27

at Kidd Brewer Stadium • Boone, NC

- Date: October 4, 2025
- Game time: 3:30 p.m. EDT
- Game weather: Cloudy • Temperature: 66 °F (19 °C) • Wind: 4 mph
- Game attendance: 35,021
- Referee: John Love
- TV announcers (ESPN+): David Jackson (play-by-play) and Avery Hall (analyst)

Game information

First quarter

- (8:21) APP – Dominic De Freitas 49-yard field goal (Drive: 10 plays, 55 yards, 4:54; Appalachian State 3–0)
- (6:49) APP – JJ Kohl 6-yard run, Dominic De Freitas kick (Drive: 4 plays, 18 yards, 1:24; Appalachian State 10–0)
- (3:38) APP – Rashod Dubinion 2-yard run, Dominic De Freitas kick (Drive: 3 plays, 75 yards, 1:26; Appalachian State 17–0)

Second quarter

- (9:32) ORST – David Wells Jr. 30-yard run, Caleb Ojeda kick (Drive: 2 plays, 67 yards, 0:44; Appalachian State 17–7)
- (4:10) ORST – David Wells Jr. 3-yard pass from Maalik Murphy, Caleb Ojeda kick (Drive: 8 plays, 93 yards, 3:48; Appalachian State 17–14)

Third quarter

- (8:41) APP – Davion Dozier 28-yard pass from JJ Kohl, Dominic De Freitas kick (Drive: 13 plays, 76 yards, 6:13; Appalachian State 24–14)
- (5:03) ORST – Cornell Hatcher Jr. 15-yard pass from Maalik Murphy, Caleb Ojeda kick (Drive: 7 plays, 75 yards, 3:38; Appalachian State 24–21)
- (0:50) APP – Dominic De Freitas 45-yard field goal (Drive: 9 plays, 49 yards, 4:06; Appalachian State 27–21)

Fourth quarter

- (1:40) ORST – Team Safety (Drive: 2 plays, -6 yards, 0:09; Appalachian State 27–23)

Statistics	ORST	APP
First downs	27	18
Plays–yards	70–456	64–354
Rushes–yards	25–98	36–136
Passing yards	358	218
Passing: comp–att–int	30–45–2	13–28–0
Turnovers	3	0
Time of possession	31:22	28:38

Team	Category	Player	Statistics
Oregon State	Passing	Maalik Murphy	30/45, 358 yards, 2 TD, 2 INT
Oregon State	Rushing	Anthony Hankerson	19 carries, 64 yards
Oregon State	Receiving	Trent Walker	13 receptions, 179 yards
Appalachian State	Passing	JJ Kohl	13/28, 218 yards, TD
Appalachian State	Rushing	Rashod Dubinion	19 carries, 98 yards, TD
Appalachian State	Receiving	Davion Dozier	4 receptions, 140 yards, TD

=== at Georgia State ===
Appalachian State Mountaineers (3–2) at Georgia State Panthers (1–4) – Game summary

Quarter	1	2	3	4	Total
Mountaineers	7	10	21	3	41
Panthers	0	0	14	6	20

at Center Parc Stadium • Atlanta, GA

- Date: October 11, 2025
- Game time: 3:30 p.m. EDT
- Game weather: Sunny
- Game attendance: 19,587
- Referee: Jeremy Parker
- TV announcers (ESPN+): Matt Stewart (play-by-play) and Sam Crenshaw (analyst)

Game information

First quarter

- (1:04) APP – Devon Dozier 12-yard pass from JJ Kohl, Dominic De Freitas kick (Drive: 13 plays, 98 yards, 5:37; Appalachian State 7–0)

Second quarter

- (2:37) APP – Jaden Barnes 11-yard pass from JJ Kohl, Dominic De Freitas kick (Drive: 10 plays, 83 yards, 4:03; Appalachian State 14–0)
- (0:00) APP – Dominic De Freitas 32-yard field goal (Drive: 8 plays, 66 yards, 1:18; Appalachian State 17–0)

Third quarter

- (12:10) APP – Jaquari Lewis 14-yard run, Dominic De Freitas kick (Drive: 3 plays, 37 yards, 1:13; Appalachian State 24–0)
- (8:10) APP – Dalton Stroman 6-yard pass from JJ Kohl, Dominic De Freitas kick (Drive: 6 plays, 59 yards, 2:41; Appalachian State 31–0)
- (4:40) GAST – Cameran Brown 8-yard run, two-point pass conversion attempt failed (Drive: 12 plays, 75 yards, 3:30; Appalachian State 31–6)
- (3:40) APP – Izayah Cummings 3-yard pass from JJ Kohl, Dominic De Freitas kick (Drive: 3 plays, 49 yards, 0:58; Appalachian State 38–6)
- (0:50) GAST – Grant Hollier 15-yard pass from Cameran Brown, Cameran Brown pass to Ted Hurst for two-point conversion (Drive: 10 plays, 75 yards, 2:50; Appalachian State 38–14)

Fourth quarter

- (10:00) APP – Dominic De Freitas 46-yard field goal (Drive: 4 plays, 4 yards, 0:47; Appalachian State 41–14)
- (6:25) GAST – Javon Robinson 22-yard pass from Cameran Brown, two-point pass conversion attempt failed (Drive: 8 plays, 75 yards, 3:35; Appalachian State 41–20)

Statistics	APP	GAST
First downs	23	24
Plays–yards	74–435	84–381
Rushes–yards	36–124	23–78
Passing yards	311	303
Passing: Comp–Att–Int	23–38–0	32–61–1
Turnovers	0	1
Time of possession	31:47	28:13

Team	Category	Player	Statistics
Appalachian State	Passing	JJ Kohl	21/32, 309 yards, 4 TD
Appalachian State	Rushing	Jaquari Lewis	14 carries, 57 yards, TD
Appalachian State	Receiving	Izayah Cummings	6 receptions, 94 yards, TD
Georgia State	Passing	Cameran Brown	19/35, 212 yards, 2 TD
Georgia State	Rushing	Cameran Brown	7 carries, 30 yards, TD
Georgia State	Receiving	Ted Hurst	9 receptions, 105 yards

=== Coastal Carolina (rivalry) ===
Coastal Carolina Chanticleers (3–3) at Appalachian State Mountaineers (4–2) – Game summary

Quarter	1	2	3	4	Total
Chanticleers	10	7	14	14	45
Mountaineers	14	10	10	3	37

at Kidd Brewer Stadium • Boone, NC

- Date: October 18, 2025
- Game weather: Sunny • Temperature: 71 °F (22 °C) • Wind: E 5 mph
- Game attendance: 33,862
- Referee: Scott Broadway
- TV announcers (ESPN+): David Jackson (play-by-play) and Avery Hall (analyst)

Game information

First quarter

- (10:10) APP – Davion Dozier 15-yard pass from JJ Kohl, Dominic De Freitas kick (Drive: 10 plays, 75 yards, 4:50; Appalachian State 7–0)
- (7:56) CCU – Kian Afrookhteh 43-yard field goal (Drive: 7 plays, 49 yards, 2:14; Appalachian State 7–3)
- (3:26) APP – Rashod Dubinion 12-yard run, Dominic De Freitas kick (Drive: 10 plays, 75 yards, 4:30; Appalachian State 14–3)
- (0:30) CCU – Malcolm Gillie 34-yard pass from MJ Morris, Kian Afrookhteh kick (Drive: 7 plays, 65 yards, 2:48; Appalachian State 14–10)

Second quarter

- (8:45) APP – Jaden Barnes 6-yard pass from JJ Kohl, Dominic De Freitas kick (Drive: 15 plays, 75 yards, 6:45; Appalachian State 21–10)
- (3:40) CCU – Samari Collier 4-yard run, Kian Afrookhteh kick (Drive: 11 plays, 75 yards, 5:05; Appalachian State 21–17)
- (0:00) APP – Dominic De Freitas 31-yard field goal (Drive: 1 play, 0 yards, 0:04; Appalachian State 24–17)

Third quarter

- (12:52) APP – Jaden Barnes 77-yard punt return, Dominic De Freitas kick (Drive: 3 plays, 0 yards, 2:08; Appalachian State 31–17)
- (9:49) CCU – Samari Collier 6-yard run, Kian Afrookhteh kick (Drive: 7 plays, 75 yards, 3:03; Appalachian State 31–24)
- (4:37) APP – Dominic De Freitas 25-yard field goal (Drive: 13 plays, 68 yards, 5:12; Appalachian State 34–24)
- (0:04) CCU – Jameson Tucker 37-yard pass from Samari Collier, Kian Afrookhteh kick (Drive: 8 plays, 75 yards, 4:28; Appalachian State 34–31)

Fourth quarter

- (9:03) APP – Dominic De Freitas 23-yard field goal (Drive: 14 plays, 84 yards, 6:00; Appalachian State 37–31)
- (3:19) CCU – Dominic Knicely 1-yard run, Kian Afrookhteh kick (Drive: 13 plays, 75 yards, 5:44; Coastal Carolina 38–37)
- (1:56) CCU – Jevon Edwards 8-yard run, Kian Afrookhteh kick (Drive: 3 plays, 27 yards, 0:20; Coastal Carolina 45–37)

Statistics	CCU	APP
First downs	23	27
Plays–yards	63–410	76–410
Rushes–yards	41–246	35–132
Passing yards	164	278
Passing: Comp–Att–Int	15–22–1	27–41–0
Turnovers	1	1
Time of possession	28:29	31:31

Team	Category	Player	Statistics
Coastal Carolina	Passing	Samari Collier	12/19, 118 yards, TD, INT
Coastal Carolina	Rushing	Samari Collier	17 carries, 74 yards, 2 TD
Coastal Carolina	Receiving	Jameson Tucker	1 reception, 37 yards, TD
Appalachian State	Passing	J. J. Kohl	27/41, 278 yards, 2 TD
Appalachian State	Rushing	Jaquari Lewis	15 carries, 43 yards
Appalachian State	Receiving	Davion Dozier	4 receptions, 70 yards, TD

=== at Old Dominion ===
Appalachian State Mountaineers (4–3) at Old Dominion Monarchs (4–3) – Game summary

Quarter	1	2	3	4	Total
Mountaineers	0	7	0	14	21
Monarchs	7	3	14	0	24

at S.B. Ballard Stadium • Norfolk, VA

- Date: October 25, 2025
- Game time: 12:00 p.m. EDT
- Game weather: Sunny • Temperature: 59 °F (15 °C) • Wind: 14 mph
- Game attendance: 18,097
- Referee: Trennis Livingston
- TV announcers (ESPNU): Doug Sherman (play-by-play) and Tyoka Jackson (analyst)

Game information

First quarter

- (8:24) ODU – Ke'Travion Hargrove 70-yard pass from Colton Joseph, Riley Callaghan kick (Drive: 2 plays, 85 yards, 0:39; Old Dominion 7–0)

Second quarter

- (2:10) ODU – Riley Callaghan 33-yard field goal (Drive: 10 plays, 50 yards, 4:53; Old Dominion 10–0)
- (0:30) APP – Jaden Barnes 16-yard pass from JJ Kohl, Dominic De Freitas kick (Drive: 12 plays, 75 yards, 1:40; Old Dominion 10–7)

Third quarter

- (10:02) ODU – Na'eem Abdul-Rahim Gladdling 16-yard pass from Colton Joseph, Riley Callaghan kick (Drive: 8 plays, 49 yards, 3:55; Old Dominion 17–7)
- (0:26) ODU – Ja'Cory Thomas 24-yard pass from Colton Joseph, Riley Callaghan kick (Drive: 7 plays, 61 yards, 3:03; Old Dominion 24–7)

Fourth quarter

- (9:26) APP – Kanen Hamlett 35-yard pass from AJ Swann, Dominic De Freitas kick (Drive: 7 plays, 91 yards, 1:57; Old Dominion 24–14)
- (1:35) APP – Davion Dozier 34-yard pass from AJ Swann, Dominic De Freitas kick (Drive: 9 plays, 79 yards, 1:47; Old Dominion 24–21)

Statistics	APP	ODU
First downs	23	26
Plays–yards	72–374	80–459
Rushes–yards	18–73	45–149
Passing yards	301	310
Passing: Comp–Att–Int	32–54–2	21–35–1
Turnovers	2	1
Time of possession	24:41	35:19

Team	Category	Player	Statistics
Appalachian State	Passing	AJ Swann	12/16, 140 yards, 2 TD
Appalachian State	Rushing	Rashod Dubinion	9 carries, 51 yards
Appalachian State	Receiving	Davion Dozier	4 receptions, 75 yards, TD
Old Dominion	Passing	Colton Joseph	21/35, 310 yards, 3 TD, INT
Old Dominion	Rushing	Colton Joseph	18 carries, 61 yards
Old Dominion	Receiving	Na'eem Abdul-Raheem Gladding	8 receptions, 105 yards, TD

=== Georgia Southern (Deeper Than Hate) ===
Georgia Southern Eagles (3–5) at Appalachian State Mountaineers (4–4) – Game summary

Quarter	1	2	3	4	Total
Eagles	9	10	3	3	25
Mountaineers	0	3	6	14	23

at Kidd Brewer Stadium • Boone, NC

- Date: November 6, 2025
- Game time: 7:30 p.m. EST
- Game weather: Clear • Temperature: 46 °F (8 °C) • Wind: SE 3 mph
- Game attendance: 31,876
- Referee: Jeremy Parker
- TV announcers (ESPN2): Courtney Lyle (play-by-play) and Rene Ingoglia (analyst)

Game information

First quarter

- (14:16) GASO – Marcus Sanders Jr. 47-yard pass from JC French IV (Drive: 3 plays, 75 yards, 0:44; Georgia Southern 6–0)
- (4:11) GASO – Tripp Bryant 21-yard field goal (Drive: 10 plays, 61 yards, 5:02; Georgia Southern 9–0)

Second quarter

- (7:31) GASO – JC French IV 3-yard run, Tripp Bryant kick (Drive: 10 plays, 59 yards, 4:19; Georgia Southern 16–0)
- (1:14) GASO – Tripp Bryant 26-yard field goal (Drive: 13 plays, 65 yards, 3:44; Georgia Southern 19–0)
- (0:00) APP – Dominic De Freitas 36-yard field goal (Drive: 9 plays, 57 yards, 1:14; Georgia Southern 19–3)

Third quarter

- (9:20) GASO – Tripp Bryant 23-yard field goal (Drive: 11 plays, 67 yards, 4:32; Georgia Southern 22–3)
- (4:51) APP – David Larkins 1-yard pass from AJ Swann (Drive: 11 plays, 78 yards, 4:23; Georgia Southern 22–9)

Fourth quarter

- (13:50) APP – Jaquari Lewis 27-yard run, Dominic De Freitas kick (Drive: 10 plays, 69 yards, 3:57; Georgia Southern 22–16)
- (9:05) GASO – Tripp Bryant 24-yard field goal (Drive: 9 plays, 65 yards, 4:40; Georgia Southern 25–16)
- (1:56) APP – Jaden Barnes 16-yard pass from AJ Swann, Dominic De Freitas kick (Drive: 11 plays, 66 yards, 3:28; Georgia Southern 25–23)

Statistics	GASO	APP
First downs	25	23
Plays–yards	75–494	74–425
Rushes–yards	38–142	23–77
Passing yards	352	348
Passing: Comp–Att–Int	25–37–0	34–51–1
Turnovers	0	1
Time of possession	32:20	27:39

Team	Category	Player	Statistics
Georgia Southern	Passing	JC French IV	25/37, 352 yards, TD
Georgia Southern	Rushing	OJ Arnold	20 carries, 105 yards
Georgia Southern	Receiving	Marcus Sanders Jr.	6 receptions, 127 yards, TD
Appalachian State	Passing	AJ Swann	34/51, 348 yards, 2 TD, INT
Appalachian State	Rushing	Jaquari Lewis	6 carries, 50 yards, TD
Appalachian State	Receiving	Jaden Barnes	13 receptions, 160 yards, TD

=== at James Madison ===
Appalachian State Mountaineers (4–5) at James Madison Dukes (8–1) – Game summary

Quarter	1	2	3	4	Total
Mountaineers	0	0	0	10	10
Dukes	7	20	10	21	58

at Bridgeforth Stadium • Harrisonburg, VA

- Date: November 15, 2025
- Game time: 3:30 p.m. EST
- Game weather: Sunny • Temperature: 65 °F (18 °C) • Wind: 8 mph
- Game attendance: 25,298
- Referee: Ted Pitts
- TV announcers (ESPN+): Curt Dudley (play-by-play), Delvin Joyce (analyst) and David Hulvey (sideline reporter)

Game information

First quarter

- (6:54) JMU – Wayne Knight 1-yard run, Morgan Suarez kick (Drive: 4 plays, 46 yards, 1:58; James Madison 7–0)

Second quarter

- (10:25) JMU – Morgan Suarez 42-yard field goal (Drive: 13 plays, 61 yards, 6:54; James Madison 10–0)
- (7:39) JMU – Jobi Malary 1-yard run, Morgan Suarez kick (Drive: 6 plays, 62 yards, 2:22; James Madison 17–0)
- (1:26) JMU – Alonza Barnett III 1-yard run, Morgan Suarez kick (Drive: 10 plays, 70 yards, 3:58; James Madison 24–0)
- (0:00) JMU – Morgan Suarez 38-yard field goal (Drive: 9 plays, 53 yards, 1:04; James Madison 27–0)

Third quarter

- (12:50) JMU – Alonza Barnett III 7-yard run, Morgan Suarez kick (Drive: 4 plays, 24 yards, 1:36; James Madison 34–0)
- (4:06) JMU – Morgan Suarez 26-yard field goal (Drive: 14 plays, 78 yards, 7:46; James Madison 37–0)

Fourth quarter

- (13:20) JMU – Jobi Malary 1-yard run, Morgan Suarez kick (Drive: 8 plays, 55 yards, 4:01; James Madison 44–0)
- (10:48) APP – Dominic De Freitas 48-yard field goal (Drive: 9 plays, 42 yards, 2:26; James Madison 44–3)
- (7:53) JMU – Jobi Malary 9-yard run, Morgan Suarez kick (Drive: 4 plays, 75 yards, 2:55; James Madison 51–3)
- (4:45) JMU – Matthew Sluka 35-yard run, Morgan Suarez kick (Drive: 4 plays, 70 yards, 2:17; James Madison 58–3)
- (1:54) APP – Davion Dozier 19-yard pass from JJ Kohl, Dominic De Freitas kick (Drive: 8 plays, 76 yards, 2:45; James Madison 58–10)

Statistics	APP	JMU
First downs	10	32
Plays–yards	52–146	89–627
Rushes–yards	15–1	54–324
Passing yards	145	303
Passing: Comp–Att–Int	14–37–1	22–35–1
Turnovers	1	1
Time of possession	17:42	42:18

Team	Category	Player	Statistics
Appalachian State	Passing	JJ Kohl	6/8, 81 yards, TD
Appalachian State	Rushing	Rashod Dubinion	10 carries, 25 yards
Appalachian State	Receiving	Dalton Stroman	3 receptions, 74 yards
James Madison	Passing	Alonza Barnett III	22/35, 303 yards, INT
James Madison	Rushing	Jobi Malary	8 carries, 105 yards, 3 TD
James Madison	Receiving	Jaylan Sanchez	2 receptions, 69 yards

=== Marshall (The Old Mountain Feud) ===
Marshall Thundering Herd (5-5) vs Appalachian State Mountaineers (4-6) – Game summary

Quarter	1	2	3	4	Total
Thundering Herd	7	14	3	0	24
Mountaineers	3	13	7	3	26

at Kidd Brewer Stadium • Boone, North Carolina

- Date: November 22, 2025
- Game time: 2:30 p.m. EST
- Game weather: Sunny • Temperature: 58 °F (14 °C) • Wind: E 15 mph
- Game attendance: 31,322
- Referee: Brandon Kirkland
- TV announcers (ESPN+): David Jackson (play-by-play) and Avery Hall (analyst)

Game information

First quarter

- (7:38) APP – Dominic De Freitas 32-yard field goal (Drive: 9 plays, 52 yards, 3:12; Appalachian State 3–0)
- (1:20) MRSH – Jo'Shon Barbie 5-yard run, Lorcan Quinn kick (Drive: 8 plays, 41 yards, 2:30; Marshall 7–3)

Second quarter

- (13:04) APP – Jaquari Lewis 18-yard run, two-point pass conversion attempt failed (Drive: 9 plays, 75 yards, 3:16; Appalachian State 9–7)
- (11:34) MRSH – Carlos Del Rio-Wilson 16-yard run, Lorcan Quinn kick (Drive: 4 plays, 75 yards, 1:30; Marshall 14–9)
- (8:14) MRSH – Carlos Del Rio-Wilson 4-yard run, Lorcan Quinn kick (Drive: 6 plays, 55 yards, 2:34; Marshall 21–9)
- (0:53) APP – David Larkins 19-yard pass from JJ Kohl, Dominic De Freitas kick (Drive: 8 plays, 75 yards, 3:15; Marshall 21–16)

Third quarter

- (9:27) APP – Jaquari Lewis 5-yard run, Dominic De Freitas kick (Drive: 12 plays, 75 yards, 5:33; Appalachian State 23–21)
- (5:29) MRSH – Lorcan Quinn 25-yard field goal (Drive: 9 plays, 64 yards, 3:52; Marshall 24–23)

Fourth quarter

- (2:02) APP – Dominic De Freitas 23-yard field goal (Drive: 8 plays, 35 yards, 3:31; Appalachian State 26–24)

Statistics	MRSH	APP
First downs	23	18
Plays–yards	70–438	70–276
Rushes–yards	40–238	43–142
Passing yards	200	134
Passing: Comp–Att–Int	21–30–1	19–27–0
Turnovers	3	0
Time of possession	30:09	29:51

Team	Category	Player	Statistics
Marshall	Passing	Carlos Del Rio-Wilson	13/21, 146 yards, INT
Marshall	Rushing	Jo'Shon Barbie	10 carries, 102 yards, TD
Marshall	Receiving	Demarcus Lacey	12 receptions, 134 yards
Appalachian State	Passing	JJ Kohl	19/27, 134 yards, TD
Appalachian State	Rushing	Jaquari Lewis	33 carries, 175 yards, 2 TDs
Appalachian State	Receiving	Jaquari Lewis	5 receptions, 39 yards

=== Arkansas State ===
Arkansas State Red Wolves (5-6) at Appalachian State Mountaineers (5-6) – Game summary

Quarter	1	2	3	4	Total
Red Wolves	3	13	7	7	30
Mountaineers	3	13	7	6	29

at Kidd Brewer Stadium • Boone, NC

- Date: November 29, 2025
- Game time: 2:30 p.m. EST
- Game weather: Cloudy • Temperature: 34 °F (1 °C) • Wind: N 7 mph
- Game attendance: 23,876
- Referee: Tim Barker
- TV announcers (ESPN+): David Jackson (play-by-play) and Avery Hall (analyst)

Game information

First quarter

- (11:15) APP – Dominic De Freitas 43-yard field goal (Drive: 10 plays, 50 yards, 3:45; Appalachian State 3–0)
- (2:36) ARST – Clune Van Andel 24-yard field goal (Drive: 9 plays, 42 yards, 4:21; Tied 3–3)

Second quarter

- (13:47) APP – Dominic De Freitas 38-yard field goal (Drive: 10 plays, 59 yards, 3:45; Appalachian State 6–3)
- (9:44) APP – Dalton Stroman 37-yard pass from JJ Kohl, Dominic De Freitas kick (Drive: 2 plays, 37 yards, 0:39; Appalachian State 13–3)
- (1:33) ARST – Corey Rucker 8-yard pass from Jaylen Raynor, Clune Van Andel PAT failed (Drive: 8 plays, 71 yards, 2:25; Appalachian State 13–9)
- (1:16) ARST – Tyler Fortenberry 13-yard pass from Jaylen Raynor, Clune Van Andel kick (Drive: 3 plays, 13 yards, 0:13; Arkansas State 16–13)
- (0:03) APP – Dominic De Freitas 45-yard field goal (Drive: 3 plays, 49 yards, 0:26; Tied 16–16)

Third quarter

- (7:34) APP – Sam Mbake 16-yard pass from JJ Kohl, Dominic De Freitas kick (Drive: 7 plays, 66 yards, 3:22; Appalachian State 23–16)
- (2:38) ARST – Corey Rucker 6-yard pass from Jaylen Raynor, Clune Van Andel kick (Drive: 12 plays, 75 yards, 4:56; Tied 23–23)

Fourth quarter

- (11:37) APP – Dominic De Freitas 48-yard field goal (Drive: 4 plays, 17 yards, 1:23; Appalachian State 26–23)
- (1:34) APP – Dominic De Freitas 29-yard field goal (Drive: 12 plays, 74 yards, 4:11; Appalachian State 29–23)
- (0:42) ARST – Kenyon Clay 1-yard run, Clune Van Andel kick (Drive: 7 plays, 75 yards, 0:52; Arkansas State 30–29)

Statistics	ARST	APP
First downs	23	23
Plays–yards	81–448	75–453
Rushes–yards	34–85	36–182
Passing yards	363	271
Passing: Comp–Att–Int	32-47-1	26-39-0
Turnovers	3	1
Time of possession	30:31	29:29

Team	Category	Player	Statistics
Arkansas State	Passing	Jaylen Raynor	32/47, 363 yards, 3 TD, INT
Arkansas State	Rushing	Kenyon Clay	14 carries, 52 yards, TD
Arkansas State	Receiving	Chauncey Cobb	5 receptions, 117 yards
Appalachian State	Passing	JJ Kohl	26/39, 271 yards, 2 TD
Appalachian State	Rushing	Jaquari Lewis	22 carries, 108 yards
Appalachian State	Receiving	David Larkins	6 receptions, 72 yards

=== vs. Georgia Southern (Birmingham Bowl) ===
2025 JLab Birmingham Bowl
Georgia Southern Eagles (6–6) vs. Appalachian State Mountaineers (5–7) – Game summary

Quarter	1	2	3	4	Total
Eagles	7	6	13	3	29
Mountaineers	0	7	3	0	10

at Protective Stadium • Birmingham, AL

- Date: December 29, 2025
- Game time: 2:00 p.m. EST
- Game weather: Sunny • Temperature: 44 °F (7 °C) • Wind: NNW at 13 mph (21 km/h)
- Game attendance: 12,092
- Referee: Rory Bernard (Conference USA)
- TV announcers (ESPN): Taylor Zarzour (play-by-play), Matt Stinchcomb (analyst) and Alyssa Lang (sideline)

Game information

First quarter

- GASO – Terrance Gibbs 1-yard run (Tripp Bryant kick), 8:23. Eagles 7–0. Drive: 11 plays, 66 yards, 5:14.

Second quarter

- GASO – Tripp Bryant 23-yard field goal, 9:00. Eagles 10–0. Drive: 11 plays, 73 yards, 5:20.
- APP – Matthew Wilson 6-yard run (Dominic De Freitas kick), 1:51. Eagles 10–7. Drive: 7 plays, 53 yards, 2:43.
- GASO – Tripp Bryant 36-yard field goal, 0:01. Eagles 13–7. Drive: 10 plays, 57 yards, 1:51.

Third quarter

- GASO – Weston Bryan 3-yard run (pass failed), 13:34. Eagles 19–7. Drive: 3 plays, 73 yards, 1:22.
- GASO – Marcus Sanders Jr. 32-yard pass from JC French IV (Tripp Bryant kick), 8:50. Eagles 26–7. Drive: 5 plays, 65 yards, 1:29.
- APP – Dominic De Freitas 27-yard field goal, 3:46. Eagles 26–10. Drive: 9 plays, 66 yards, 4:58.

Fourth quarter

- GASO – Tripp Bryant 27-yard field goal, 3:57. Eagles 29–10. Drive: 17 plays, 81 yards, 10:02.

Statistics	GASO	APP
First downs	22	21
Plays–yards	65–413	62–379
Rushes–yards	38–242	33–187
Passing yards	171	192
Passing: Comp–Att–Int	18–27–1	16–29–4
Turnovers	1	4
Time of possession	30:35	29:25

Team	Category	Player	Statistics
Georgia Southern	Passing	JC French IV	18/25, 171 yards, TD
Georgia Southern	Rushing	OJ Arnold	11 carries, 152 yards
Georgia Southern	Receiving	Marcus Sanders Jr.	5 receptions, 72 yards, TD
Appalachian State	Passing	Matthew Wilson	12/22, 128 yards, 2 INT
Appalachian State	Rushing	Matthew Wilson	12 carries, 110 yards, TD
Appalachian State	Receiving	Dalton Stroman	3 receptions, 96 yards

== Personnel ==
=== Roster ===
2025 Appalachian State Mountaineers football team roster
Players
Coaches
Offense

Pos.	#	Name	Class
WR	0	Doopah Coleman	Fr
WR	1	Davion Dozier	So
RB	2	Kanye Roberts	Jr
WR	3	Sam Mbake	Jr
TE	4	Izayah Cummings	Sr
QB	5	AJ Swann	Jr
QB	6	Matthew Wilson	Fr
RB	7	Rashod Dubinion	Sr
WR	8	Dalton Stroman	Sr
QB	9	Billy Wiles	Sr
QB	10	Gregory Fee	Fr
QB	11	Noah Gillon	Fr
WR	12	William Fowles	So
WR	13	Jackson Grier	So
WR	15	Jaden Barnes	Jr
WR	16	Alex Sanchez	Fr
QB	17	J. J. Kohl	So
RB	18	Khalifa Keith	So
WR	19	Derick Brazil	Fr
RB	20	Jaylon Calhoun	So
RB	22	Jaquari Lewis	Fr
WR	25	Zahn Coakley	So
RB	26	Khamani Alexander	Fr
RB	31	Max Guest	Fr
TE	44	Jared Gibble	Sr
OL	52	Cayden Sweatt	So
OL	53	Jake Ganoe	Jr
OL	54	Moritz Schmoranzer	Fr
OL	55	Shamarr Jackson	Sr
OL	63	Jayden Ramsey	Sr
OL	64	Michael Marotta	Sr
OL	65	Gabe Funk	Fr
OL	66	Danny Stevens	So
OL	67	Trent Ramsey	Jr
OL	68	Lance Williams	So
OL	70	Big Al Oliver	Fr
OL	72	Denell Nix Jr.	Fr
OL	73	Will Flowers	Sr
OL	74	Griffin Scroggs	Jr
OL	75	Felix Doege	Fr
OL	76	Luke Burgess	So
OL	77	Daniel Davis	So
OL	78	Tyriq Poindexter	Sr
WR	80	Trae Nickelson III	Jr
WR	81	Jose Leon	Fr
WR	82	Chris Lawson Jr.	So
TE	85	David Larkins	Sr
TE	86	Kanen Hamlett	Jr
TE	87	Dillon Galloway	Fr
WR	88	Bryce Gee	Fr
RB		Jaysen Angulo	Jr
WR		Damien Durrette	Fr

Defense

Pos.	#	Name	Class
LB	0	Jaelin Willis	Sr
DL	1	Shawn Collins	Sr
DB	2	Ethan Johnson	Sr
DL	3	Joseph Bakhole	Sr
DB	4	Myles Farmer	Sr
DB	5	Zyeir Gamble	So
DB	6	Emory Floyd	Jr
DB	7	Jordan Favors	Sr
DB	8	Dylan Hasz	Jr
DL	9	Dylan Manuel	So
LB	10	Colton Phares	So
DB	11	Juan Berchal	Fr
LB	12	Brayshawn Littlejohn	So
DB	13	Elijah Mc-Cantos	Jr
DL	15	Thomas Davis	Jr
DB	16	Tyshawn Sanders	Fr
DB	17	Ja'Torian Mack	Fr
DB	18	Ja'Den McBurrows	Jr
DB	19	DaRon Wilson	Fr
DB	20	Kaleb Neal	Fr
DB	21	DJ Burks	Jr
LB	22	Ronnie Porter	Sr
DB	24	Cristian Conyer	Jr
DB	25	Ahmad Robinson	Jr
DB	27	Cam Fleming	So
LB	28	Jayden Bethea	So
DB	30	Ashton Parker	Fr
LB	31	Marquis Lane-Owens	So
DL	33	Aiden Benton	So
LB	35	Brooks Yurachek	So
DB	36	Luke Lair	Jr
DB	39	Kavin White	Fr
LB	40	Cole Becker	Jr
DL	41	Caleb Sandstrom	So
LB	42	Braxton Veiga	So
DL	44	Rondo Porter	Jr
DL	45	Nick Campbell	Jr
DL	46	Nick Avery	Fr
LB	49	Randy Marion III	So
DL	50	Jackson Briley	Fr
DL	51	KJ Liles	Fr
DL	52	Orlando Leon	Jr
LB	56	Kyle Arnholt	Sr
DL	91	Malik Berry	Sr
DL	92	AJ Mebane	So
DL	93	DeNigel Cooper	Fr
DL	94	Caleb Pitts	Fr
DL	95	Kaden Ellis	Fr
DL	96	Saint Farrior	So
DL	97	Kevin Abrams-Verwayne	Sr
DL	98	Kelvin Crawford	Fr
DL	99	Bucci Farmer	Fr

Special teams

Pos.	#	Name	Class
P	27	Mitchell Lake	So
K	29	Carter Everett	Jr
LS	30	Gabriel Simpkins	So
P	37	Ian Ratliff	So
K	39	Jackson Moore	So
K	43	Cash McVay	Sr
LS	47	Jacob Poff	Fr
K	90	Dominic De Freitas	Fr

Head coach

- Dowell Loggains (Arkansas)

Coordinators/assistant coaches

- Clyde Christensen (North Carolina)
  Associate head coach
- D. J. Smith (Appalachian State)
  Defensive coordinator/LB
- Jeff Crosby (Northern Arizona)
  Special teams coordinator
- Curtis Fuller (TCU)
  Defensive pass game coordinator/DB
- Aashon Larkins (Lehigh)
  Offensive recruiting coordinator/RB
- Anthony Shakir (Brevard)
  Defensive recruiting coordinator/Edges
- Keith Jones Jr. (UT Martin)
  Defensive line
- Allen Mogridge (North Carolina)
  Offensive line
- Riley Watkins (Pittsburg State)
  Quarterbacks
- Ryan Yurachek (Marshall)
  Tight ends
- Matt Greenhalgh (Rhode Island)
  Director of athletic performance for football
- Kevin Higgins (West Chester)
  Chief of staff/Pass game specialist

Legend

- (C) Team captain
- (S) Suspended
- (I) Ineligible
- Injured
- Redshirt

Roster
Last update: September 8, 2025
