= D. J. Smith =

D. J. Smith may refer to:

- D. J. Smith (ice hockey) (born 1977), former Ottawa Senators head coach and NHL player
- D. J. Smith (American football) (born 1989), American football linebacker

== See also ==
- Smith (surname)
