= Duke's Mayo Classic =

Annual college football game

- Stadium: Bank of America Stadium
- Location: Charlotte, North Carolina, U.S.
- Operated: 2015–present

Sponsors
- Belk (2015–2019); Duke's Mayonnaise (2020–present)

2025 matchup
- Appalachian State 34, Charlotte 11

2026 matchup
- West Virginia 38, Virginia 27

The Duke's Mayo Classic (known before 2020 as the Belk College Kickoff) is an annual college football game played during the early part of the college football season in Charlotte at Bank of America Stadium, home of the Carolina Panthers.

== Game results ==
| Season | Date | Winning team | | Losing team | | Attendance |
|---|---|---|---|---|---|---|
| 2015 | September 3, 2015 | South Carolina Gamecocks | 17 | North Carolina Tar Heels | 13 | 51,664 |
| 2017 | September 2, 2017 | South Carolina Gamecocks | 35 | NC State Wolfpack | 28 | 50,367 |
| 2018 | September 1, 2018 | 17 West Virginia Mountaineers | 40 | Tennessee Volunteers | 14 | 66,793 |
| 2019 | August 31, 2019 | North Carolina Tar Heels | 24 | South Carolina Gamecocks | 20 | 52,183 |
| 2020 | September 26, 2020 | Notre Dame Fighting Irish | — | Wake Forest Demon Deacons | — | N/A (Note: Originally scheduled for September 5, the game was rescheduled as a conference game September 26 in Charlotte. After Wake Forest postponed the game, it was rescheduled for December 12 before being scrubbed by the Atlantic Coast Conference to allow Wake Forest to play the postponed December 5 game at Louisville. Notre Dame instead played in the 2020 ACC Championship Game.) |
| 2021 | September 2, 2021 | Appalachian State Mountaineers | 33 | East Carolina Pirates | 19 | 36,752 |
| 2021 | September 4, 2021 | 5 Georgia Bulldogs | 10 | 3 Clemson Tigers | 3 | 74,187 |
| 2022 | September 3, 2022 | North Carolina Central Eagles | 28 | North Carolina A&T Aggies | 13 | 35,798 |
| 2023 | September 2, 2023 | 21 North Carolina Tar Heels | 31 | South Carolina Gamecocks | 17 | 68,723 |
| 2024 | September 7, 2024 | 14 Tennessee Volunteers | 51 | 24 NC State Wolfpack | 10 | 72,730 |
| 2025 | August 29, 2025 | Appalachian State Mountaineers | 34 | Charlotte 49ers | 11 | 35,718 |
| 2026 | September 19, 2026 | West Virginia Mountaineers | 38 | 25 Virginia Cavaliers | 27 | 39,377 |

Rankings are from the AP Poll.

== Future games ==
| Season | Date | Matchup | |
|---|---|---|---|
| 2027 | September 3, 2027 | North Carolina A&T Aggies | North Carolina Central Eagles |
| 2027 | October 9, 2027 | Wake Forest Demon Deacons | Notre Dame Fighting Irish |
| 2028 | August 26, 2028 | Tennessee Volunteers | West Virginia Mountaineers |
| 2029 | September 1, 2029 | Appalachian State Mountaineers | East Carolina Pirates |
| 2031 | August 30, 2031 | Virginia Tech Hokies | Wisconsin Badgers |
| 2032 | September 4, 2032 | Virginia Cavaliers | West Virginia Mountaineers |

== Records ==
=== By team ===
| Team | Appearances | Record | Win % |
|---|---|---|---|
| South Carolina | 4 | 2–2 | .500 |
| North Carolina | 3 | 2–1 | .667 |
| Appalachian State | 2 | 2–0 | 1.000 |
| West Virginia | 2 | 2–0 | 1.000 |
| Tennessee | 2 | 1–1 | .500 |
| NC State | 2 | 0–2 | .000 |
| Georgia | 1 | 1–0 | 1.000 |
| North Carolina Central | 1 | 1–0 | 1.000 |
| Clemson | 1 | 0–1 | .000 |
| East Carolina | 1 | 0–1 | .000 |
| North Carolina A&T | 1 | 0–1 | .000 |
| Charlotte | 1 | 0–1 | .000 |
| Virginia | 1 | 0–1 | .000 |

=== By conference ===
| Conference | Appearances | Record | Win % |
|---|---|---|---|
| SEC | 7 | 4–3 | .571 |
| ACC | 7 | 2–5 | .286 |
| Big 12 | 2 | 2–0 | 1.000 |
| Sun Belt | 2 | 2–0 | 1.000 |
| American | 2 | 0–2 | .000 |
| MEAC | 1 | 1–0 | 1.000 |
| Big South | 1 | 0–1 | .000 |
