= Dowell Loggains =

American football coach (born 1980)

Current position
- Title: Head coach
- Team: Appalachian State
- Conference: SBC
- Record: 12–12

Biographical details
- Born: October 1, 1980 (age 46); Newport, Arkansas, U.S.
- Education: University of Arkansas

Playing career
- 2000–2004: Arkansas
- Position: Quarterback

Coaching career (HC unless noted)
- 2008–2009: Tennessee Titans (OQC)
- 2010–2011: Tennessee Titans (QB)
- 2012–2013: Tennessee Titans (OC)
- 2014: Cleveland Browns (QB)
- 2015: Chicago Bears (QB)
- 2016–2017: Chicago Bears (OC)
- 2018: Miami Dolphins (OC)
- 2019–2020: New York Jets (OC/QB)
- 2021–2022: Arkansas (TE)
- 2023–2024: South Carolina (OC/QB)
- 2025–present: Appalachian State

Head coaching record
- Overall: 12–12
- Bowls: 0-1

Dowell Loggains (born October 1, 1980) is an American football coach who currently serves as the head football coach at Appalachian State University. He has been the offensive coordinator for the Tennessee Titans, Chicago Bears, Miami Dolphins and New York Jets of the National Football League (NFL). He played college football as a quarterback for the Arkansas Razorbacks, and later he served as the tight ends coach there as well. He held the offensive coordinator job for the South Carolina Gamecocks before being hired by Appalachian State.

== Coaching career ==
=== Tennessee Titans ===
Loggains served as the offensive coordinator for the Tennessee Titans from 2012 to 2013 as a part of Mike Munchak's coaching staff. Days after Ken Whisenhunt took over as Titans head coach in 2014, Loggains was informed that he wouldn't remain with the organization. He had previously been the team's quarterbacks coach.

=== Cleveland Browns ===
Loggains spent 2014 as the quarterbacks coach for the Cleveland Browns. He was an advocate of drafting Texas A&M quarterback Johnny Manziel.

=== Chicago Bears ===
The next year Loggains was looking for a job. He was interviewed for an offensive coordinator job by the New York Giants, but was instead hired by the Bears on January 23, 2015, as quarterbacks coach. Under Loggains' helm, quarterback Jay Cutler had one of his best seasons as he ended 2015 with 3,629 passing yards, 21 touchdowns, 11 interceptions, and career highs in passer rating (92.3) and completion percentage (64.4). The 11 interceptions were the lowest in his career and resulted in an interception percentage of 2.3, the lowest in a season when he has started at least 12 games, while 21 touchdowns were his second-most since 2011 and the 3,629 yards were the third-most in his career. On third down, Cutler had a 103.2 passer rating (fourth in the NFL) after completing 91 of 141 passes for 1,242 yards, seven touchdowns and two interceptions. In contrast, against the Seattle Seahawks backup quarterback Jimmy Clausen completed 9 of 17 passes for 63 yards, and including sacks, recorded 48 net passing yards, the second time since the 1990 season that the Bears had less than 50 net yards passing. The Bears ended the year with 228.9 passing yards per game, ranked 23rd in the league, with the quarterbacking group having a combined 63.9 completion percentage and 2.3 interception percentage, both of which ranked third in team history, along with 3,843 gross passing yards and a 42.5 third down percentage (fourth), 3,660 net passing yards (fifth), along with 5,514 total net yards and an 89.7 passer rating (sixth).

Loggains was promoted to offensive coordinator on January 11, 2016, when Adam Gase left the position to become the head coach of the Miami Dolphins. The Bears struggled during Loggains' tenure as OC, with a November 2017 ranking by ESPN placing him dead last among 32 playcallers, while the offense ended the 2017 season averaging just 16.5 points per game (29th in the league).

Amid the offense's difficulties, Loggains garnered some praise for the trick plays he devised during his tenure. In the 2016 season finale against the Minnesota Vikings, he called a play in which running back Jeremy Langford received the snap, handed the ball to receiver Cameron Meredith who then threw to quarterback Matt Barkley for the touchdown. It was adopted by the Philadelphia Eagles as the "Philly Special", with which they scored in Super Bowl LII; Eagles offensive coordinator Frank Reich credited the Bears with the idea. In a 2017 game versus the Minnesota Vikings, the Bears scored a two-point conversion where quarterback Mitchell Trubisky gave the ball to running back Jordan Howard, who handed off to tight end Zach Miller before lateraling to Trubisky; Loggains learned of the play during his playing career at Arkansas, and adapted it for himself under the nickname "Heisman".

=== Miami Dolphins ===
After head coach John Fox was fired, Loggains reunited with Gase in Miami, landing another offensive coordinator position for the 2018 season.

=== New York Jets ===
On January 23, 2019, Loggains reunited with Adam Gase once again after he was hired as the offensive coordinator/quarterbacks coach for the New York Jets. On October 25, 2020, in anticipation of the Week 7 matchup against the Buffalo Bills, head coach Adam Gase gave up offensive play-calling duties and gave them to Loggains. Although the Jets managed to take a 10–6 halftime lead, they were shut out in the second half, resulting in an 18–10 loss to Buffalo. On October 28, 2020, ahead of the matchup against the Kansas City Chiefs, it was reported that Loggains would again be given offensive play-calling duties. Gase was fired as the Jets' head coach in January 2021, along with his staff, including Loggains.

=== Arkansas ===
On June 14, 2021, Loggains was hired by head coach Sam Pittman as tight ends coach at the University of Arkansas, his alma mater.

=== South Carolina ===
Loggains was hired as offensive coordinator and quarterbacks coach for the University of South Carolina on December 13, 2022. His contract is three years long with a salary of $1 million per year. In 2023, his offense ranked 12th out of 14 teams in the SEC in points per game and last in the SEC in rushing yards per game.

South Carolina struggled to begin the 2024 season, being ranked as of the worst offensive teams in the SEC through the first five games. Despite the early difficulties, the team finished 9–3 and with the third-best rushing offense in the conference.

=== Appalachian State ===
On December 7, 2024, Loggains was hired by Appalachian State as the 23rd head coach in school history.

== Head coaching record ==
Year	Team	Overall	Conference	Standing	Bowl/playoffs	Coaches^{#}	AP^{°}
Appalachian State Mountaineers (Sun Belt Conference) (2025–present)
2025	Appalachian State	5–8	2–6	6th (East)	L Birmingham		
2026	Appalachian State	7–4	4–3	(East)			
Appalachian State:		12–12	6–9				
Total:		12–12					
National championship Conference title Conference division title or championship game berth
