= AJ Swann =

American football player

No. 17 – Mississippi State Bulldogs
- Position: Quarterback
- Class: Redshirt Senior

Personal information
- Listed height: 6 ft 2 in (1.88 m)
- Listed weight: 220 lb (100 kg)

Career information
- High school: Cherokee (Canton, Georgia)
- College: Vanderbilt (2022–2023); LSU (2024); Appalachian State (2025); Mississippi State (2026–present)
- Stats at ESPN

AJ Swann is an American college football quarterback for the Mississippi State Bulldogs. He previously played for the Vanderbilt Commodores, LSU Tigers, and Appalachian State Mountaineers.

== Early life ==
Swann attended Cherokee High School in Canton, Georgia. A three-star recruit according to 247Sports, he was ranked the nations 23rd overall quarterback prospect. Originally committed to Maryland, Swann flipped his commitment and decided to play college football at Vanderbilt.

== College career ==
As a freshman, Swann made his first career start against Northern Illinois, throwing four touchdowns in a comeback win. He was named the SEC freshman of the week. In his first career SEC start, Swann threw for 125 yards in a blowout loss to #2 Alabama. Swann entered his sophomore season as a starter. In the Week 0 game against Hawaii, Swann completed 19 of 30 passes for 258 yards and three touchdowns in a 35–28 win. He entered the transfer portal on December 4, 2023.

On December 18, 2023, Swann announced that he would be transferring to LSU. He was the backup to Garrett Nussmeier for the 2024 season.

On January 3, 2025, Swann decided to transfer to Appalachian State. He earned the starting job for the Mountaineers before suffering an MCL sprain midway through the season, being replaced by J. J. Kohl. After the season, Swann announced he would enter the transfer portal for the third time.

On January 5, 2026 Swann announced he was transferring to play for the Mississippi State Bulldogs.

=== Statistics ===
College statistics
Season	Team	Games			Passing								Rushing			
Season	Team	GP	GS	Record	Cmp	Att	Pct	Yds	Y/A	TD	Int	Rtg	Att	Yds	Avg	TD
2022	Vanderbilt	9	6	1–5	115	198	58.1	1,274	6.4	10	2	126.8	21	−76	−3.6	0
2023	Vanderbilt	6	6	2–4	107	196	54.6	1,457	7.4	12	7	130.1	27	16	0.6	1
2024	LSU	2	0	—	2	4	50.0	10	2.5	0	0	71.0	0	0	0.0	0
2025	Appalachian State	7	6	2–4	130	222	58.6	1,495	6.7	10	8	122.8	20	-12	-0.6	0
2026	Mississippi State	3	3	0–3	41	64	64.1	489	7.6	3	1	140.2	9	-31	-3.4	0
Career		27	21	5–16	395	684	57.7	4,725	6.9	35	18	127.4	77	-103	-1.3	1
