= J. J. Kohl =

American football quarterback

- FIU quarterback J.J. Kohl

No. 17 – FIU Panthers
- Position: Quarterback
- Class: Redshirt Junior

Personal information
- Listed height: 6 ft 7 in (2.01 m)
- Listed weight: 250 lb (113 kg)

Career information
- High school: Ankeny (Ankeny, Iowa)
- College: Iowa State (2023–2024); Appalachian State (2025); FIU (2026–present)
- Stats at ESPN

J. J. Kohl is an American college football quarterback for the FIU Panthers. He previously played for the Iowa State Cyclones and Appalachian State Mountaineers.

== Early life ==
Kohl grew up in Ankeny, Iowa and initially attended Ankeny Centennial High School. He played in a Wing T offense at Centennial and was named honorable mention All-District after passing for 891 yards and three touchdowns as a sophomore. Kohl transferred to Ankeny High School during the winter of his sophomore year. He passed for 2,185 yards and 25 touchdowns in his first season at Ankeny and was named second team All-State. Kohl was named first team All-State as a senior after passing for 2,023 yards and 17 touchdowns with five rushing touchdowns. After the season he played in the 2023 Under Armour All-America Game.

Kohl was rated a four-star recruit by major recruiting services and the eighth-best quarterback prospect nationally in the 2023 recruiting class by ESPN.com. He committed to play college football at Iowa State over offers from Minnesota, Wisconsin, Penn State, Iowa, and Florida State. Kohl later received offers from high-profile programs such as Auburn and Michigan, but he maintained his commitment to Iowa State and signed a National Letter of Intent (NLI) to play for them in December 2022. He is the highest-ranked quarterback recruit in Iowa State history.

== College career ==
=== Iowa State ===
Kohl joined the Iowa State Cyclones as an early enrollee in January 2023.

On December 9, 2024, Kohl would enter the transfer portal.

=== Appalachian State ===
On January 8, 2025, Kohl would transfer to Appalachian State. After starting quarterback AJ Swann went down with a MCL sprain, Kohl became the starter for the Mountaineers. On December 14, 2025, Kohl entered the transfer portal for the second time.

=== Florida International ===
On January 10, 2026 Kohl committed to transferring to play for the FIU Panthers.

=== College statistics ===
Season	Team	Games			Passing								Rushing			
Season	Team	GP	GS	Record	Cmp	Att	Pct	Yds	Avg	TD	Int	Rtg	Att	Yds	Avg	TD
2023	Iowa State	3	0	—	9	11	81.8	23	2.1	0	0	99.4	6	32	5.3	0
2024	Iowa State	1	0	—	0	0	0.0	0	0.0	0	0	0.0	0	0	0.0	0
2025	Appalachian State	8	6	3–3	133	216	61.6	1,465	6.8	12	2	135.0	30	50	1.7	1
Career		12	6	3–3	142	227	62.6	1,488	6.6	12	2	133.3	36	82	2.3	1

== Personal life ==
Kohl's father, Jamie Kohl, was the starting kicker at Iowa State from 1995 to 1998.
