= DJ Burks =

American football player

Tennessee Volunteers
- Position: Safety
- Class: Redshirt Senior

Personal information
- Listed height: 6 ft 0 in (1.83 m)
- Listed weight: 200 lb (91 kg)

Career information
- High school: Maryville (Maryville, Tennessee)
- College: Appalachian State (2022–2025); Tennessee (2026–present)
- Stats at ESPN

DJ Burks is an American college football safety for the Tennessee Volunteers. He previously played for the Appalachian State Mountaineers.

== Early life ==
Burks attended Maryville High School where he helped the Rebels to a 53-4 record over four seasons including a 6-A state championship in 2019. He played as both a wide receiver and defensive back. At Maryville, Burks was a three-year starter, recording 184 tackles and tying the program record for career interceptions with 15. On offense, he accrued 53 receptions for 767 yards and fourteen receiving and rushing touchdowns.

On July 2, 2021, Burks committed to play college football for Appalachian State. On December 15, 2021, Burks officially signed with the Mountaineers.

College recruiting
Name	Hometown	School	Height	Weight	Commit date
DJ Burks; ATH	Maryville, Tennessee	Maryville	6 ft 0 in (1.83 m)	185 lb (84 kg)	Feb 6, 2021
DJ Burks; ATH	Recruit ratings: Rivals: 247Sports: ESPN: (74)				

== College career ==
=== Appalachian State ===
Burks redshirted his true freshman season after appearing in two games. The following year he appeared in every game, but spent most of his time on special teams. In 2024, Burks moved into a role as a starting safety for seven of the eleven games he appeared in for the Mountaineers. Burks finished the 2025 season with the Mountaineers with 73 tackles, good for third on the team. He also contributed five pass break-ups, two interceptions, and two forced fumbles.

On December 15, 2025, Burks announced his intention to enter the transfer portal.

=== Tennessee ===
On January 17, 2026, Burks committed to transfer to Tennessee.

=== College stats ===
Year	Team	GP	Tackles					Interceptions					Fumbles		
Year	Team	GP	Solo	Ast	Cmb	TfL	Sck	Int	Yds	Avg	TD	PD	FR	FF	TD
2022	Appalachian State	2	0	0	0	0	0.0	0	0	0.0	0	0	0	0	0
2023	Appalachian State	14	0	2	2	0	0.0	0	0	0.0	0	0	0	0	0
2024	Appalachian State	11	29	29	58	3.0	0.0	0	0	0.0	0	0	0	0	0
2025	Appalachian State	13	34	39	73	1.0	0.0	2	25	12.5	0	5	0	2	0
Career		40	63	70	144	4.0	0.0	2	25	12.5	0	5	0	2	0
