= Clyde Christensen =

American football coach (born 1956)

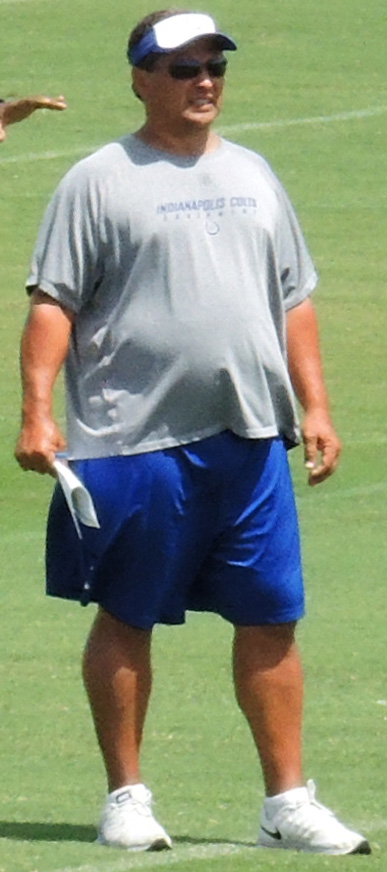
- Christensen with the Colts in 2015

Appalachian State Mountaineers
- Title: Associate head coach

Personal information
- Born: January 28, 1956 (age 70); Covina, California, U.S.

Career information
- High school: Covina (CA) Royal Oak
- College: Fresno City, North Carolina

Career history

Coaching
- Mississippi (1979) Graduate assistant; East Tennessee State (1980–1982) Quarterbacks coach & receivers coach; Temple (1983–1985) Quarterbacks coach & receivers coach; East Carolina (1986–1988) Offensive coordinator, running backs coach & quarterbacks coach; Holy Cross (1989) Receivers and tight ends coach; Holy Cross (1990) Offensive coordinator; South Carolina (1991) Running backs coach; Maryland (1992–1993) Quarterbacks coach; Clemson (1994–1995) Co-offensive coordinator & quarterbacks coach; Tampa Bay Buccaneers (1996–1998) Tight ends coach; Tampa Bay Buccaneers (1999–2000) Quarterbacks coach; Tampa Bay Buccaneers (2001) Offensive coordinator; Indianapolis Colts (2002–2007) Wide receivers coach; Indianapolis Colts (2008) Assistant head coach & wide receivers coach; Indianapolis Colts (2009–2011) Offensive coordinator; Indianapolis Colts (2012–2015) Quarterbacks coach; Miami Dolphins (2016–2017) Offensive coordinator; Tampa Bay Buccaneers (2019–2022) Quarterbacks coach; North Carolina (2023) Volunteer offensive analyst; North Carolina (2024) Senior advisor to the head coach; Appalachian State (2025–present) Associate head coach

Operations
- Miami Dolphins (2018) Director of football/player development

Awards and highlights
- 2× Super Bowl champion (XLI, LV)
- Coaching profile at Pro Football Reference

Clyde Christensen (born January 28, 1956) is an American football coach, currently working as an associate head coach at Appalachian State. Prior to his tenure at Appalachian State, Christensen spent two seasons at his alma mater North Carolina with head coach Mack Brown. A decorated assistant coach, Christensen has experience coaching collegiately and in the NFL ranks. Before returning to Chapel Hill, Christensen most recently was the quarterbacks coach for the Tampa Bay Buccaneers, where he worked with legendary quarterback Tom Brady. He has also coached for the Indianapolis Colts, where he mentored and developed Peyton Manning and Andrew Luck. Christensen has been a part of two Super Bowl-winning teams, XLI with the Colts and LV with the Buccaneers.

== Personal life ==
Christensen is married to Debbie Christensen and they have three daughters. Christensen is a Christian.
