= D. J. Smith (American football) =

American football player and coach (born 1989)

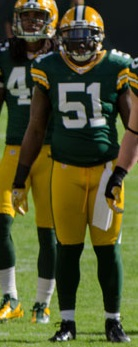
- Smith with the Green Bay Packers in 2012

Appalachian State Mountaineers
- Title: Defensive coordinator

Personal information
- Born: February 24, 1989 (age 37); Charlotte, North Carolina, U.S.
- Listed height: 5 ft 11 in (1.80 m)
- Listed weight: 240 lb (109 kg)

Career information
- High school: Independence (Charlotte)
- College: Appalachian State (2007–2010)
- NFL draft: 2011: 6th round, 186th overall pick

Career history

Playing
- Green Bay Packers (2011–2012); San Diego Chargers (2013)*; Houston Texans (2013); Carolina Panthers (2014); Cleveland Browns (2014)*
- * Offseason or practice squad member only

Coaching
- Vance HS (NC) (2015) Associate head coach & defensive coordinator; Appalachian State (2017) Senior defensive analyst; Appalachian State (2018–2019) Outside linebackers coach; Missouri (2020–2021) Linebackers coach; Missouri (2022–2024) Co-DC/Linebackers coach/recruiting coordinator; Appalachian State (2025–present) Defensive coordinator

Operations
- Appalachian State (2016) Director of recruiting relations

Awards and highlights
- NCAA FCS national champion (2007)

Career NFL statistics
- Total tackles: 83
- Sacks: 2
- Pass deflections: 5
- Interceptions: 1
- Stats at Pro Football Reference

Darryl Devon ”D. J.” Smith Jr. (born February 24, 1989), is an American football coach and former linebacker who is currently the defensive coordinator at Appalachian State and was formerly the linebackers coach at the University of Missouri. He was selected by the Green Bay Packers out of Appalachian State in the sixth round (186th pick overall) of the 2011 NFL draft.

== Early life ==
Smith attended Independence High School in Charlotte, North Carolina, where he started for three out of four years and was part of Independence football teams that went undefeated and won four straight North Carolina 4AA state titles. During his time at Independence High School, he was often rotated between middle and outside linebacker. He was an All-State recognition twice, an All-Conference nominee three times, and named team MVP his senior year. Smith also lettered three years in basketball.

== College career ==
Smith went on to play for the Appalachian State University Mountaineers, where he led the NCAA Division I FCS in active tackles with 525 by the end of his career. He also became the first Appalachian State player since three-time NFL Pro Bowl nominee Dexter Coakley to have more than 500 tackles in his career. Smith majored in Business Management.

=== 2007 ===
Smith had an eventful first season with the Mountaineers, even though he did not hold the starting job until the seventh game of the season. Even so, he recorded more tackles than any Appalachian State freshman since Dexter Coakley in 1993, and had at least 10 tackles in five of his first nine starts. He was named the Southern Conference Defensive Player of the month for November after leading the conference in tackles with 49, interceptions with two, and passes deflected with five. His first interception was against The Citadel, which he ran back 43 yards for a touchdown. During this game, he broke the record for tackles by a freshman in a game (also held by Coakley). He was named the Southern Conference Player of the week after a game against Chattanooga after recording 14 tackles and 2 pass break-ups. In the National Championship game against the Delaware Fightin' Blue Hens, he recorded 10 more tackles.

=== 2008 ===
Following his successful freshman year, Smith continued on as the starting linebacker and started all 14 games. His arguably best performance of his sophomore season took place against the Samford Bulldogs, a game in which he had 16 tackles (12 solo). Following this game, was once named the Southern Conference defensive player of the week. He again received this honor after a contest against the Alabama Crimson Tide. Smith finished the season with 123 tackles, including 53 solo tackles. He finished second in the conference and 12th in the nation and received second-team Southern Conference honors.

=== 2009 ===
Smith's success at Appalachian State University continued into his junior year, a year in which he was elected a first-team All-American by the Sports Network, and all-conference by the coaches and media. He started all fourteen games of the season and tallied fourteen tackles in the opener against East Carolina University. He continued on to earn National and Southern Conference Defensive player of the week for his performance against Samford University with 17 tackles, the most by any Mountaineer since his Freshman year. He finished the season with 137 tackles (60 solo), and with two forced fumbles and recoveries, the most on the team.

=== 2010 ===
Continuing the streak, Smith started all 13 games in his final season as a Mountaineer and was once again named a First-team All American by the Sports Network and College Football News. He was named as a second-team all-American by Phil Steele, and to the third-team by the Associated Press. On top of this, he was given first-team all Southern-Conference honors by the Coaches and Media. Though he did in fact start every game that season, only six of them were at weak-side linebacker (The position he had played most of his career). He was then moved to middle linebacker due to injuries. Even so, he still posted double-digit tackles in ten out of thirteen games. His first start at linebacker came against Samford, where he intercepted a pass and returned it 26 yards to set up a touchdown. In his final season, he registered a career-high 146 tackles (5th nationally), with 76 of them being solo.

== Professional career ==
=== Pre-draft ===
Smith was thought by scouts to be on the shorter side for a linebacker. Some noted that he "has trouble finding the ball inside at times due to his lack of height." Scouts stated that his arms were too small and limited his ability to "grab NFL backs on the way through or get off blocks". They also stated that he had a habit of overrunning plays. On the positive side, they remarked that Smith was a "Thick, compact linebacker", who often "Scrapes down the line, stays square to get to the ball". NFL scouts also said that he was good at changing directions with limited space and that he was an "Excellent wrap-up tackler in space".

Pre-draft measurables
| Height | Weight | Arm length | Hand span | Wingspan | 40-yard dash | 10-yard split | 20-yard split | 20-yard shuttle | Three-cone drill | Vertical jump | Broad jump | Bench press | Wonderlic |
|---|---|---|---|---|---|---|---|---|---|---|---|---|---|
| 5 ft 10 5/8 in (1.79 m) | 239 lb (108 kg) | 32 in (0.81 m) | 9 3/4 in (0.25 m) | 6 ft 4 7/8 in (1.95 m) | 4.88 s | 1.77 s | 2.87 s | 4.45 s | 7.35 s | 31.0 in (0.79 m) | 8 ft 8 in (2.64 m) | 20 reps | 20 |
All values from NFL Combine

=== Green Bay Packers ===
Smith was selected by the Packers 186th overall with the second of three sixth round picks in the 2011 NFL draft. Smith responded to being drafted by stating: "I'm ecstatic that Green Bay saw my talent and decided to pick me up.”

Smith was released by the Packers on April 24, 2013 after he failed a physical.

=== San Diego Chargers ===
Smith was claimed off waivers by the San Diego Chargers on April 25, 2013. He was released before the season.

=== Houston Texans ===
Smith signed with the Houston Texans on November 13, 2013.

=== Carolina Panthers ===
Smith signed with the Carolina Panthers on January 3, 2014.

== Coaching career ==
After his playing career ended, Smith accepted an offer from his former high school coach to be the defensive coordinator at Vance High School in Charlotte, North Carolina. He accepted a position at his alma mater Appalachian State in 2016 as the program's director of recruiting relations. He was reassigned to a defensive analyst position in 2017, and promoted to outside linebackers coach in 2018.

Smith was named the linebackers coach at Missouri in 2020. In January 2022, Smith was named co-defensive coordinator and recruiting coordinator while retaining his role as linebacker coach. Following the conclusion of the 2022 season, Smith signed an extension with Missouri through 2024 with an annual salary of $550,000.

On December 29, 2024, it was announced that Smith would be returning to his alma mater to serve as the defensive coordinator for the Appalachian State Mountaineers beginning with the 2025 season.
