= Appalachian State–Coastal Carolina football rivalry =

College football rivalry

- Appalachian State Mountaineers Coastal Carolina Chanticleers
- First meeting: September 17, 2005; Appalachian State, 30–3
- Latest meeting: October 16, 2026; Appalachian State, 35–32
- Next meeting: TBA
- Stadiums: Brooks Stadium; Kidd Brewer Stadium
- Trophy: None

Statistics
- Total meetings: 13
- All-time series: Appalachian State, 8–5
- Largest victory: Appalachian State, 55–14 (2012)
- Longest win streak: Appalachian State, 6 (2005–2019)
- Current win streak: Appalachian State, 1 (2026–present)

Locations of Appalachian State and Coastal Carolina

The Appalachian State–Coastal Carolina football rivalry is an American college football rivalry, the first meeting was in 2005, but did not really become intense until the latter’s ascension to the Sun Belt Conference in 2017.

== History ==
The second meeting in this series occurred in 2006. This was just Coastal's third season of football and was their first playoff matchup. It occurred on November 25, 2006. App St jumped out to a 31–0 lead just before the half, and would end up winning the game comfortably 45–28 Appalachian State would win the first six meetings, finally losing to Coastal in 2020 in Conway, SC. At the time Coastal was ranked 15th in the US in the AP Poll.

In 2021 the rivalry really took off following comments from then Coastal Carolina linebacker Teddy Gallagher who called out App State on social media before the October meeting. This fueled the fire of hatred between the two schools. The 2021 meeting saw Appalachian State knock off the 14th ranked Chanticleers in Boone, NC. Fans stormed the field following a walk off 24 yard field goal in front of a crowd of 31,061 from Chandler Staton. In 2022 Coastal Carolina would beat Appalachian State for the first time in front of a full crowd. The students would end up rushing the field, and a few were injured following the game that year. After the 2023 meeting in Boone, NC, App St fans threw beers on the field following their team's 27–24 loss by field goal as time expired. App State would later denounce the actions of their students.

Prior to the 2024 meeting, Coastal Carolina added a picture within their facilities of App State fans giving an obscene gesture to its players after Coastal's victory in Boone, NC in the 2023 meeting.

Prior to the 2025 game, Coastal Carolina posted a video depicting a player taunting deceased App State player, Jack Murphy. The video was later deleted. Coastal Carolina would go on to win the game 45–37. After the game, a brawl would break out after Coastal Carolina planted a flag on the 50-yard line of Kid Brewer Stadium. Coastal would go on to denounce the actions of their players, stating that the behavior "did not live up to the expected sportsmanship standard here at Coastal Carolina University." after the "great rivalry victory for our football team", with the situation and possible disciplinary action set to be handled internally.

Following the game, Coastal Carolina would post on social media, "Too bad it's not a rivalry", poking fun at the four-game win streak in the series, as well as perceived poor behavior by App State.

== Game results ==
Coastal Carolina victories	Appalachian State victories	Tie games

No.	Date	Location	Winner	Score
1	September 17, 2005	Boone, NC	Appalachian State	30–3
2	November 25, 2006	Boone, NC	Appalachian State	45–28
3	September 29, 2012	Boone, NC	Appalachian State	55–14
4	October 21, 2017	Boone, NC	Appalachian State	37–29
5	November 3, 2018	Conway, SC	Appalachian State	23–7
6	September 28, 2019	Boone, NC	Appalachian State	56–37
7	November 21, 2020	Conway, SC	Coastal Carolina	34–23
8	October 20, 2021	Boone, NC	Appalachian State	30–27
9	November 3, 2022	Conway, SC	Coastal Carolina	35–28
10	October 10, 2023	Boone, NC	Coastal Carolina	27–24
11	November 7, 2024	Conway, SC	Coastal Carolina	38–24
12	October 18, 2025	Boone, NC	Coastal Carolina	45–37
13	October 16, 2026	Conway, SC	Appalachian State	35–32
Series: Appalachian State leads 8–5

== See also ==
- List of NCAA college football rivalry games
