= List of Ohio Valley Conference football champions =

Ohio Valley Conference football champions
- Conference Football Champion
- Sport: College football
- Conference: Ohio Valley Conference
- Number of teams: 9
- Played: 1948–2022
- Current champion: Austin Peay (2) Southeast Missouri State (2)
- Most championships: Eastern Kentucky (21)

This is a list of yearly regular season champions in college football of the National Collegiate Athletic Association (NCAA) FCS Ohio Valley Conference. Fifteen different teams have won a championship in the seven decade history of the OVC; every team that plays in the conference has won at least one conference championship.

After the 2022 season, the OVC effectively merged its football league with that of the Big South Conference as the Big South–OVC Football Association.

== Champions by year ==
Season	Champion	Record
1948	Murray State	3–1
1949	Evansville	3–1–1
1950	Murray State	5–0–1
1951	Murray State	5–1
1952	Tennessee Tech	4–1
1952	Western Kentucky	4–1
1953	Tennessee Tech	5–0
1954	Eastern Kentucky	5–0
1955	Tennessee Tech	5–0
1956	Middle Tennessee	5–0
1957	Middle Tennessee	5–0
1958	Middle Tennessee	5–1
1958	Tennessee Tech	5–1
1959	Middle Tennessee	5–0–1
1959	Tennessee Tech	5–0–1
1960	Tennessee Tech	6–0
1961	Tennessee Tech	6–0
1962	East Tennessee State	4–2
1962	Eastern Kentucky	4–2
1962	Middle Tennessee	4–2
1962	Morehead State	4–2
1963	Western Kentucky	7–0
1964	Middle Tennessee	6–1
1965	Middle Tennessee	7–0
1966	Morehead State	6–1
1967	Eastern Kentucky	5–0–2
1968	Eastern Kentucky	7–0
1969	East Tennessee State	6–0–1
1970	Western Kentucky	5–1–1
1971	Western Kentucky	5–2
1972	Tennessee Tech	7–0
1973	Western Kentucky	7–0
1974	Eastern Kentucky	6–1
1975	Tennessee Tech †	6–1
1976	Eastern Kentucky	6–1
1977	Austin Peay State	6–1
1978	Western Kentucky	6–0
1979	Murray State	6–0
1980	Western Kentucky	6–1
1981	Eastern Kentucky	8–0
1982	Eastern Kentucky	7–0
1983	Eastern Kentucky	6–1
1984	Eastern Kentucky	6–1
1985	Middle Tennessee	7–0
1986	Eastern Kentucky	6–1
1986	Murray State	6–1
1987	Eastern Kentucky	5–1
1987	Youngstown State	5–1
1988	Eastern Kentucky	6–0
1989	Middle Tennessee	6–0
1990	Eastern Kentucky	5–1
1990	Middle Tennessee	5–1
1991	Eastern Kentucky	7–0
1992	Middle Tennessee	8–0
1993	Eastern Kentucky	8–0
1994	Eastern Kentucky	8–0
1995	Murray State	8–0
1996	Murray State	8–0
1997	Eastern Kentucky	7–0
1998	Tennessee State	6–1
1999	Tennessee State	7–0
2000	Western Kentucky	7–0
2001	Eastern Illinois	6–1
2002	Eastern Illinois	5–1
2002	Murray State	5–1
2003	Jacksonville State	7–1
2004	Jacksonville State	7–1
2005	Eastern Illinois	8–0
2006	Eastern Illinois	7–1
2006	UT Martin	6–1
2007	Eastern Kentucky	8–0
2008	Eastern Kentucky	7–1
2009	Eastern Illinois (Note: Jacksonville State (6–1) had the best record in the conference, but was ineligible for the championship due to Academic Progress Rate sanctions.)	6–2
2010	Southeast Missouri State	7–1
2011	Tennessee Tech (Note: Tennessee Tech won the tiebreaker for the OVC's automatic bid to the FCS playoffs.)	6–2
2011	Eastern Kentucky	6–2
2011	Jacksonville State	6–2
2012	Eastern Illinois	6–1
2013	Eastern Illinois	8–0
2014	Jacksonville State	8–0
2015	Jacksonville State	8–0
2016	Jacksonville State	8-0
2017	Jacksonville State	8-0
2018	Jacksonville State	7-1
2019	Austin Peay (Note: Austin Peay Won the tiebreaker for the OVC's automatic bid to the FCS Playoffs)	7-1
2019	Southeast Missouri State	7-1
2020/21 ††	Jacksonville State	6-1
2021	UT Martin	5-1
2022	UT Martin	5-0
2022	Southeast Missouri State (Note: SEMO Won the tiebreaker for the OVC's automatic bid to the FCS Playoffs)	5-0
2023	UT Martin	5-1
2023	Gardner-Webb (Note: Gardner-Webb Won the tiebreaker for the Big South-OVC's automatic bid to the FCS Playoffs)	5-1
2024	UT Martin	6-2
2024	Tennessee Tech	6-2
2024	Tennessee State	6-2
2024	Southeast Missouri State (Note: SEMO won the tiebreaker for the Big South-OVC's automatic bid to the FCS playoffs.)	6-2
2025	Tennessee Tech	8-0

† Both the OVC and Tennessee Tech list Tennessee Tech (6–1) as champion, while Western Kentucky (6–1) with a head-to-head victory over Tennessee Tech claims this as a co-championship.

†† Due to the COVID-19 pandemic, the 2020 OVC season was postponed until the Spring of 2021. Some teams played in the Fall. However, all conference games were played as per normal and the champions were crowned on April 11, 2021.

== Championships by team ==
Team	Ohio Valley Championships	Years
Eastern Kentucky	21	**1954**, 1962, **1967, 1968, 1974, 1976, 1981, 1982, 1983, 1984**, 1986, 1987, **1988, 1990, 1991, 1993, 1994, 1997, 2007, 2008**, 2011
Tennessee Tech	12	1952, **1953, 1955**, 1958, 1959, **1960, 1961, 1972, 1975**, 2011, 2024, **2025**
Middle Tennessee State	11	**1956, 1957**, 1958, 1959, 1962, **1964, 1965, 1985**, **1989**, 1990, **1992**
Jacksonville State	9	**2003, 2004**, 2011, **2014, 2015, 2016, 2017, 2018, 2020/21**
Western Kentucky	9	1952, **1963, 1970, 1971, 1973**, 1975†,**1978, 1980, 2000**
Murray State	8	1948, **1950, 1951, 1979**, 1986, **1995, 1996**, 2002
Eastern Illinois	7	**2001**, 2002, **2005, 2006, 2009, 2012, 2013**
UT Martin	5	**2006**, **2021**, 2022, 2023, 2024
Southeast Missouri State	4	**2010**, 2019, 2022, 2024
Tennessee State	3	**1998, 1999**, 2024
East Tennessee State	2	1962, **1969**
Morehead State	2	1962, **1966**
Evansville	2	1948, **1949**
Austin Peay	2	**1977**, 2019
Youngstown State	1	1987
Gardner-Webb	1	2023

Bold indicates an outright conference championship.

Italics indicates a school not competing in the Big South–OVC Football Association.

† Claimed as a co-championship by WKU, but not recognized by the Ohio Valley Conference.
