= 1960 Tangerine Bowl =

The 1960 Tangerine Bowl may refer to:

- 1960 Tangerine Bowl (January), played January 1, 1960, between the Middle Tennessee Blue Raiders and the Presbyterian Blue Hose
- 1960 Tangerine Bowl (December), played December 30, 1960, between The Citadel Bulldogs and the Tennessee Tech Golden Eagles
