= 1953 Middle Tennessee Blue Raiders football team =

American college football season

1953 Middle Tennessee Blue Raiders football
- Conference: Ohio Valley Conference
- Record: 7–4 (3–2 OVC)
- Head coach: Charles M. Murphy (7th season)
- Captains: H. Alsup; G. Rather
- Home stadium: Horace Jones Field

1953 Ohio Valley Conference football standings
	Conf.					Overall
Team	W		L		T	W		L		T
Tennessee Tech $	5	–	0	–	0	7	–	4	–	0
Eastern Kentucky	4	–	1	–	0	8	–	2	–	0
Middle Tennessee	3	–	2	–	0	7	–	4	–	0
Western Kentucky	2	–	3	–	0	6	–	4	–	0
Murray State	1	–	4	–	0	3	–	6	–	0
Morehead State	0	–	5	–	0	0	–	8	–	0
$ – Conference champion

The 1953 Middle Tennessee Blue Raiders football team represented the Middle Tennessee State College—now known as Middle Tennessee State University—as a member of the Ohio Valley Conference (OVC) during the 1953 college football season. Led by seventh-year head coach Charles M. Murphy, the Blue Raiders compiled a record an overall record of 7–4 with a mark of 3–2 in conference play, placing third in the OVC. The team's captains were H. Alsup and G. Rather.

== Schedule ==
Date	Opponent	Site	Result	Attendance	Source
September 19	Western Kentucky	Horace Jones Field; Murfreesboro, TN	W 13–0		
September 26	at Eastern Kentucky	Hanger Field; Richmond, KY	L 6–15		
October 3	Sewart Air Force Base*	Horace Jones Field; Murfreesboro, TN	W 33–0		
October 10	at Troy State*	Veterans Memorial Stadium; Troy, AL (rivalry)	W 6–0		
October 17	at Morehead State	Morehead, KY	W 14–0		
October 24	Memphis State*	Horace Jones Field; Murfreesboro, TN	W 26–20		
October 31	Florence State*	Horace Jones Field; Murfreesboro, TN	L 0–14		
November 7	at Murray State	Cutchin Stadium; Murray, KY	W 28–25		
November 14	East Tennessee State*	Horace Jones Field; Murfreesboro, TN	W 34–28		
November 21	at Vanderbilt*	Dudley Field; Nashville, TN	L 13–31	16,000	
November 26	Tennessee Tech	Horace Jones Field; Murfreesboro, TN	L 13–46		
*Non-conference game

== After the season ==
=== NFL draft ===
The following Blue Raider was selected in the 1954 NFL draft following the season.

Round	Pick	Player	Position	NFL club
21	251	Howard Alsup	Tackle	San Francisco 49ers
