= Star Wood =

American football coach and college athletics administrator

Playing career

Football
- c. 1934: Milligan

Basketball
- c. 1934: Milligan

Baseball
- c. 1934: Milligan

Coaching career (HC unless noted)

Football
- 1936: Coeburn HS (VA) (assistant)
- 1937–1939: Milligan (line)
- 1942: Appalachian State (backfield)
- 1944–1945: NC State (assistant)
- 1947–1949: Tennessee Tech (assistant)
- 1950–1951: Tennessee Tech
- 1952–1953: East Tennessee State
- 1955–1965: East Tennessee State

Administrative career (AD unless noted)
- 1954–1962: East Tennessee State

Head coaching record
- Overall: 74–67–7
- Bowls: 3–1

Accomplishments and honors

Championships
- 1 OVC (1962)

Awards
- 2× OVC Coach of the Year (1957, 1962)

Sterling "Star" Wood was an American football coach and college athletics administrator. He served as the head football coach at Tennessee Polytechnic Institute—now known as Tennessee Tech—in Cookeville, Tennessee from 1950 to 1951, and East Tennessee State University in Johnson City, Tennessee from 1952 to 1953 and 1955 to 1965. Wood was also the athletic director at East Tennessee State from 1954 to 1962.

Wood attended Big Stone Gap High School in Big Stone Gap, Virginia, where he lettered in football, baseball, and track before graduating as valedictorian of his class in 1931. He moved on to Milligan College in Milligan College, Tennessee, earning varsity letters in football, basketball, and baseball. He received a Master of Arts degree from the University of Tennessee in 1940.

Wood began his career as a teacher at the Roaring Fork mining camp and then as an English teacher and assistant football coach at Coeburn High School in Coeburn, Virginia. He then returned to Milligan College as an English instructor and line coach to assist head football coach Steve Lacy. Wood was the backfield coach under Beattie Feathers at Appalachian State Teachers College—now known as Appalachian State University in 1942 and also an assistant under Feathers at North Carolina State University. He was an assistant football coach at Tennessee Tech under Hooper Eblen for three seasons before succeeding Eblen as head football coach in December 1949.

== Head coaching record ==
Year	Team	Overall	Conference	Standing	Bowl/playoffs
Tennessee Tech Golden Eagles (Ohio Valley Conference) (1950–1951)
1950	Tennessee Tech	4–7	1–5	7th	
1951	Tennessee Tech	5–5–1	3–3	T–4th	
Tennessee Tech:		9–12–1	4–8		
East Tennessee State (Volunteer State Athletic Conference) (1952–1953)
1952	East Tennessee State	6–1–2	1–1–1		W Burley
1953	East Tennessee State	5–4			W Burley
East Tennessee State (Volunteer State Athletic Conference) (1955–1957)
1955	East Tennessee State	6–3–1			W Burley
1956	East Tennessee State	4–5			L Burley
1957	East Tennessee State	5–6			
East Tennessee State (Ohio Valley Conference) (1958–1965)
1958	East Tennessee State	5–4	4–2	3rd	
1959	East Tennessee State	6–3	4–2	3rd	
1960	East Tennessee State	3–4–2	1–3–2	5th	
1961	East Tennessee State	3–7	1–5	6th	
1962	East Tennessee State	8–2	4–2	T–1st	
1963	East Tennessee State	7–2	5–2	3rd	
1964	East Tennessee State	5–5	3–4	T–5th	
1965	East Tennessee State	2–6–1	1–6	8th	
East Tennessee State:		65–52–6			
Total:		74–67–7			
National championship Conference title Conference division title or championship game berth
