= Tucker Stadium =

Stadium in Cookeville, Tennessee

Coordinates: 36.178085°N 85.506169°W

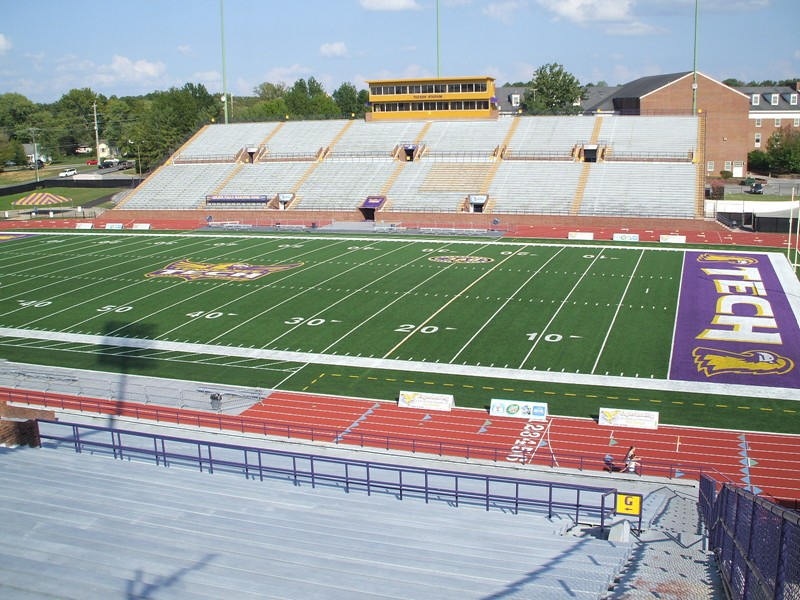
- Tucker Stadium in 2007
- Interactive map of Tucker Stadium
- Location: 1105 N Peachtree Ave; Cookeville, Tennessee 38501
- Owner: Tennessee Tech
- Operator: Tennessee Tech
- Capacity: 16,500
- Surface: Stadia Turf

Construction
- Groundbreaking: 1965
- Opened: 1966

Tenant
- Tennessee Tech Golden Eagles (NCAA) (1966–present)

Tucker Stadium is a 16,500-seat multi-purpose stadium in Cookeville, Tennessee. It is home to the Tennessee Tech Golden Eagles football team, and is named for former coach Wilburn Tucker. The football field is named Overall Field in honor of former coach and administrator P. V. Overall.

Tucker Stadium hosted the TSSAA high school football state championships between 2009 and 2020.

== History ==
Construction on the stadium began in 1965, and was completed in time for the following year's football season. The first Golden Eagles football game at the stadium was played on September 24, 1966, against the Chattanooga Mocs.

In October 1980, during Tennessee Tech's Homecoming celebration, the stadium was officially renamed Tucker Stadium, in honor of former Tennessee Tech football coach Wilburn Tucker. Tennessee Tech hosted a viewing party at Tucker Stadium, to watch the August 21, 2017 solar eclipse which was viewable in totality on this day.

=== Renovations ===
Artificial turf was first installed on the football field in 1970. In 2007, Tucker Stadium received upgrades to its playing field with the installation of new artificial turf, as well as renovations and a new surface to the nine-lane track. Upgraded lighting systems were added to the stadium in 2008. In 2009, additional facility upgrades were performed on the press box. Prior to the 2018 football season, a new, large video scoreboard was installed.

In November 2021, it was announced that the west side of Tucker Stadium would be demolished and replaced with a new west side featuring all premium seating, suites, and club level seats. The project was estimated to cost $30 million. Demolition of the west side of the stadium began in August 2024.

== See also ==
- List of NCAA Division I FCS football stadiums
