= 1956 East Tennessee State Buccaneers football team =

American college football season

1956 East Tennessee State Buccaneers football

Burley Bowl, L 12–32 vs. Memphis State
- Conference: Volunteer State Athletic Conference
- Record: 4–5 (2–1 VSAC)
- Head coach: Star Wood (4th season)
- Home stadium: College Stadium

The 1956 East Tennessee State Buccaneers football team was an American football team that represented East Tennessee State College (ETSC), now known as East Tennessee State University, as a member of the Volunteer State Athletic Conference (VSAC) during the 1956 college football season. Led by fourth-year head coach Star Wood, the Buccaneers compiled an overall record of 4–5.

== Schedule ==
Date	Opponent	Site	Result	Attendance	Source
September 15	at Austin Peay	Municipal Stadium; Clarksville, TN	L 7–13		
September 22	Western Kentucky*	College Stadium; Johnson City, TN	L 7–12		
September 29	at Western Carolina*	Memorial Stadium; Cullowhee, NC	W 7–6		
October 6	Maryville (TN)	College Stadium; Johnson City, TN	W 29–14	3,500	
October 12	at Eastern Kentucky*	Hanger Field; Richmond, KY	W 13–12		
October 20	Florence State*	College Stadium; Johnson City, TN	L 7–21	5,000	
October 27	at Tennessee Tech	Overall Field; Cookeville, TN	W 20–13		
November 10	Middle Tennessee*	College Stadium; Johnson City, TN	L 6–20		
November 22	vs. Memphis State*	Memorial Stadium; Johnson City, TN (Burley Bowl)	L 12–32	1,200	
*Non-conference game; Source:
