= Charles M. Murphy (coach) =

American college sports coach and administrator

Biographical details
- Born: December 15, 1913; Nashville, Tennessee, U.S.
- Died: January 31, 1999 (aged 85); Murfreesboro, Tennessee, U.S.

Playing career

Football
- 1935–1937: Middle Tennessee

Baseball
- 1936–1938: Middle Tennessee
- 1938: Meridian Scrappers
- 1938: Jersey City Giants
- 1939–1940: Fort Smith Giants
- 1941: Meridian Eagles
- Positions: First baseman, outfielder, second baseman (baseball)

Coaching career (HC unless noted)

Football
- 1947–1968: Middle Tennessee

Basketball
- 1948–1949: Middle Tennessee

Baseball
- 1951–1955: Middle Tennessee

Administrative career (AD unless noted)
- 1947–1981: Middle Tennessee

Head coaching record
- Overall: 155–63–8 (football); 11–12 (basketball); 42–24–1 (baseball)
- Bowls: 2–2

Accomplishments and honors

Championships
- Football; 9 VSAC (1947, 1949–1953, 1955–1957); 7 OVC (1956–1959, 1962, 1964–1965)

Awards
- Football; OVC Coach of the Year (1965)

Charles M. "Bubber" Murphy (December 15, 1913 – January 31, 1999) was an American college football, college basketball, and college baseball coach and athletics administrator. He served as the head football coach at Middle Tennessee State University from 1947 to 1968, compiling a record of 155–63–8. Murphy was also the head basketball coach at Middle Tennessee State for one season in 1948–49 and the head baseball coach at the school in 1951 and from 1953 to 1955. The Murphy Center, an athletic facility at Middle Tennessee State, was named in his honor when it was completed in 1972. In 1976, he was inducted to the Sports Hall of Fame at Middle Tennessee State and the Tennessee Sports Hall of Fame.

Murphy lettered in football, baseball, basketball, and tennis at Middle Tennessee. He then played professional baseball in the minor league system of the New York Giants. Murphy died of cancer, on January 31, 1999, at the Alvin C. York Veterans Administration Medical Center in Murfreesboro, Tennessee.

== Head coaching record ==
=== Football ===
Year	Team	Overall	Conference	Standing	Bowl/playoffs
Middle Tennessee Blue Raiders (Volunteer State Athletic Conference) (1947–1951)
1947	Middle Tennessee	9–1	5–0	1st	
1948	Middle Tennessee	5–5	2–2	4th	
1949	Middle Tennessee	8–0–1	2–0	1st	
1950	Middle Tennessee	9–2	4–0	1st	
1951	Middle Tennessee	7–2–2		1st	
Middle Tennessee Blue Raiders (Ohio Valley Conference / Volunteer State Athletic Conference) (1952–1957)
1952	Middle Tennessee	6–5	2–2 (OVC)	4th (OVC) / 1st (VSAC)	
1953	Middle Tennessee	7–4	3–2 (OVC)	3rd (OVC) / 1st (VSAC)	
1954	Middle Tennessee	4–4–2	2–2–1 (OVC)	4th (OVC)	
1955	Middle Tennessee	7–2–1	4–1 (OVC)	2nd (OVC) / 1st (VSAC)	
1956	Middle Tennessee	7–3	5–0 (OVC)	1st (OVC) / 1st (VSAC)	L Refrigerator
1957	Middle Tennessee	10–0	5–0 (OVC)	1st (OVC) / 1st (VSAC)	
Middle Tennessee Blue Raiders (Ohio Valley Conference) (1958–1968)
1958	Middle Tennessee	8–2	5–1	T–1st	
1959	Middle Tennessee	10–0–1	5–0–1	T–1st	W Tangerine
1960	Middle Tennessee	5–5	5–2	T–2nd	
1961	Middle Tennessee	7–4	5–1	2nd	L Tangerine
1962	Middle Tennessee	6–4	4–2	T–1st	
1963	Middle Tennessee	8–2	6–1	2nd	
1964	Middle Tennessee	8–2–1	6–1	1st	W Grantland Rice
1965	Middle Tennessee	10–0	7–0	1st	
1966	Middle Tennessee	7–3	5–2	2nd	
1967	Middle Tennessee	5–5	4–3	3rd	
1968	Middle Tennessee	2–8	1–6	T–7th	
Middle Tennessee:		155–63–8			
Total:		155–63–8			
National championship Conference title Conference division title or championship game berth
