= 1953 Western Kentucky Hilltoppers football team =

American college football season

1953 Western Kentucky Hilltoppers football
- Conference: Ohio Valley Conference
- Record: 6–4 (2–3 OVC)
- Head coach: Jack Clayton (6th season)
- Captains: Marvin Satterly; Max Stevens

1953 Ohio Valley Conference football standings
	Conf.					Overall
Team	W		L		T	W		L		T
Tennessee Tech $	5	–	0	–	0	7	–	4	–	0
Eastern Kentucky	4	–	1	–	0	8	–	2	–	0
Middle Tennessee	3	–	2	–	0	7	–	4	–	0
Western Kentucky	2	–	3	–	0	6	–	4	–	0
Murray State	1	–	4	–	0	3	–	6	–	0
Morehead State	0	–	5	–	0	0	–	8	–	0
$ – Conference champion

The 1953 Western Kentucky Hilltoppers football team represented Western Kentucky State College (now known as Western Kentucky University) as a member of the Ohio Valley Conference (OVC) during the 1953 college football season. Led by sixth-year head coach Jack Clayton, the Hilltoppers compiled an overall record of 6–4 with a mark of 2–3 in conference play, placing fourth in the OVC. The team's captains were Marvin Satterly and Max Stevens.

== Schedule ==
Date	Opponent	Site	Result	Source
September 19	at Middle Tennessee	Murfreesboro, TN (rivalry)	L 0–13	
September 26	East Tennessee State*	Bowling Green, KY	W 32–13	
October 3	at Stetson*	DeLand Municipal Stadium; DeLand, FL	L 7–18	
October 10	Morehead State	Bowling Green, KY	W 48–0	
October 17	at Northeast Louisiana State*	Brown Stadium; Monroe, LA	W 28–0	
October 24	Tennessee Tech^{†}	Bowling Green, KY	L 21–34	
October 31	at Delta State*	Cleveland, MS	W 21–19	
November 7	at Eastern Kentucky	Richmond, KY (rivalry)	W 7–13	
November 14	Evansville*	Bowling Green, KY	W 26–13	
November 21	Murray State	Bowling Green, KY (rivalry)	W 13–7	
*Non-conference game; ^{†}Homecoming
