= 1956 Western Kentucky Hilltoppers football team =

American college football season

1956 Western Kentucky Hilltoppers football
- Conference: Ohio Valley Conference
- Record: 5–4 (2–3 OVC)
- Head coach: Jack Clayton (9th season)
- Captains: Jim Chambliss; Bill Strawn

1956 Ohio Valley Conference football standings
| | Conf. | | | | | Overall |
| Team | W | | L | | T | W | | L | | T |
|---|---|---|---|---|---|---|---|---|---|---|
| Middle Tennessee $ | 5 | – | 0 | – | 0 | 7 | – | 2 | – | 0 |
| Murray State | 4 | – | 1 | – | 0 | 6 | – | 4 | – | 0 |
| Western Kentucky | 2 | – | 3 | – | 0 | 5 | – | 4 | – | 0 |
| Tennessee Tech | 2 | – | 3 | – | 0 | 5 | – | 4 | – | 1 |
| Eastern Kentucky | 2 | – | 3 | – | 0 | 4 | – | 5 | – | 0 |
| Morehead State | 0 | – | 5 | – | 0 | 2 | – | 6 | – | 0 |
$ – Conference champion

The 1956 Western Kentucky Hilltoppers football team represented Western Kentucky State College (now known as Western Kentucky University) as a member of the Ohio Valley Conference (OVC) during the 1958 college football season. Led by Jack Clayton in his ninth and final year as head coach, the Hilltoppers compiled an overall record of 5–4 with a mark of 2–3 in conference play, tying for third place in the OVC. The team's captains were Jim Chambliss and Bill Strawn.

== Schedule ==
| Date | Opponent | Site | Result | Source |
|---|---|---|---|---|
| September 22 | at East Tennessee State* | Johnson City, TN | W 12–7 | |
| September 29 | Middle Tennessee | Bowling Green, KY (rivalry) | L 6–7 | |
| October 6 | Youngstown State* | Bowling Green, KY | W 26–9 | |
| October 13 | at Tennessee Tech | Cookeville, TN | L 26–39 | |
| October 20 | Eastern Kentucky^{†} | Bowling Green, KY (rivalry) | W 14–6 | |
| October 27 | at Memphis State* | Crump Stadium; Memphis, TN | L 0–42 | |
| November 3 | at Morehead State | Morehead, KY | W 9–7 | |
| November 10 | Mississippi College* | Bowling Green, KY | W 14–0 | |
| November 17 | at Murray State | Cutchin Stadium; Murray, KY (rivalry) | L 13–34 | |
*Non-conference game; ^{†}Homecoming
