= 1959 East Tennessee State Buccaneers football team =

American college football season

1959 East Tennessee State Buccaneers football
- Conference: Ohio Valley Conference
- Record: 6–3 (4–2 OVC)
- Head coach: Star Wood (7th season)
- Home stadium: College Stadium

1959 Ohio Valley Conference football standings
	Conf.					Overall
Team	W		L		T	W		L		T
No. 3 Middle Tennessee +	5	–	0	–	1	10	–	0	–	1
Tennessee Tech +	5	–	0	–	1	7	–	2	–	2
East Tennessee State	4	–	2	–	0	7	–	3	–	0
Western Kentucky	3	–	3	–	0	5	–	4	–	0
Eastern Kentucky	2	–	4	–	0	3	–	6	–	0
Morehead State	1	–	5	–	0	3	–	6	–	0
Murray State	0	–	6	–	0	0	–	10	–	0
+ – Conference co-champions; Rankings from UPI small college poll

The 1959 East Tennessee State Buccaneers football team represented East Tennessee State College (now known as East Tennessee State University) as a member of the Ohio Valley Conference (OVC) during the 1959 college football season. Led by seventh-year head coach Star Wood, the Buccaneers compiled an overall record of 6–3, with a mark of 4–2 in conference play, and finished third in the OVC.

== Schedule ==
Date	Opponent	Site	Result	Attendance	Source
September 19	Murray State	College Stadium; Johnson City, TN	W 7–0	3,000	
September 26	at Western Kentucky	Bowling Green, KY	W 13–7	3,000	
October 3	at Jacksonville State*	College Bowl; Jacksonville, AL	L 0–13	6,000	
October 10	Tennessee Tech	College Stadium; Johnson City, TN	L 7–19	4,000	
October 17	Eastern Kentucky	College Stadium; Johnson City, TN	W 13–7	5,000	
October 24	Wofford*	College Stadium; Johnson City, TN	W 18–8	500	
October 31	at Morehead State	Jayne Memorial Stadium; Morehead, KY	W 27–21	3,000	
November 7	Austin Peay*	College Stadium; Johnson City, TN	W 44–14	600	
November 14	at No. 4 Middle Tennessee	Horace Jones Field; Murfreesboro, TN	L 6–30	2,000	
*Non-conference game; Rankings from AP Poll released prior to the game; Source:
