= 1955 Middle Tennessee Blue Raiders football team =

American college football season

1955 Middle Tennessee Blue Raiders football
- Conference: Ohio Valley Conference
- Record: 7–2–1 (4–1 OVC)
- Head coach: Charles M. Murphy (9th season)
- Captains: G. Haley; S. Corban
- Home stadium: Horace Jones Field

1955 Ohio Valley Conference football standings
	Conf.					Overall
Team	W		L		T	W		L		T
Tennessee Tech $	5	–	0	–	0	7	–	3	–	0
Middle Tennessee	4	–	1	–	0	7	–	2	–	1
Eastern Kentucky	3	–	2	–	0	5	–	4	–	1
Murray State	2	–	3	–	0	6	–	4	–	0
Western Kentucky	1	–	4	–	0	3	–	6	–	0
Morehead State	0	–	5	–	0	0	–	9	–	0
$ – Conference champion

The 1955 Middle Tennessee Blue Raiders football team represented the Middle Tennessee State College—now known as Middle Tennessee State University—as a member of the Ohio Valley Conference (OVC) during the 1955 college football season. Led by ninth-year head coach Charles M. Murphy, the Blue Raiders compiled a record an overall record of 7–2–1 with a mark of 4–1 in conference play, placing second in the OVC. The team's captains were G. Haley and S. Corban.

== Schedule ==
Date	Opponent	Site	Result	Attendance	Source
September 16	Morris Harvey*	Horace Jones Field; Murfreesboro, TN	W 14–7		
September 23	at Eastern Kentucky	Richmond, KY	W 21–14		
October 1	Western Kentucky	Horace Jones Field; Murfreesboro, TN	W 25–13		
October 8	at Austin Peay*	Clarksville Municipal Stadium; Clarksville, TN	T 14–14		
October 16	Morehead State	Morehead, KY	W 21–0		
October 22	at Vanderbilt*	Dudley Field; Nashville, TN	L 0–46	17,500	
October 29	Florence State*	Horace Jones Field; Murfreesboro, TN	W 25–21		
November 5	at Murray State	Cutchin Stadium; Murray, KY	W 33–28	5,000	
November 12	East Tennessee State*	Horace Jones Field; Murfreesboro, TN	W 20–7		
November 24	Tennessee Tech	Horace Jones Field; Murfreesboro, TN	L 14–55	10,000	
*Non-conference game

== After the season ==
=== NFL draft ===
The following Blue Raiders were selected in the 1956 NFL draft following the season.

Round	Pick	Player	Position	NFL club
16	185	Billy Hix	Tackle	Philadelphia Eagles
30	354	Terry Sweeney	Back	Baltimore Colts
