= 1965 Western Kentucky Hilltoppers football team =

American college football season

1965 Western Kentucky Hilltoppers football
- Conference: Ohio Valley Conference
- Record: 2–6–2 (1–5–1 OVC)
- Head coach: Nick Denes (8th season)
- Captain: Ken Frick

1965 Ohio Valley Conference football standings
	Conf.					Overall
Team	W		L		T	W		L		T
Middle Tennessee $	7	–	0	–	0	10	–	0	–	0
Austin Peay	6	–	1	–	0	8	–	1	–	0
Eastern Kentucky	4	–	2	–	1	4	–	4	–	1
Morehead State	3	–	4	–	0	3	–	6	–	0
Tennessee Tech	3	–	4	–	0	3	–	7	–	0
Murray State	1	–	4	–	2	2	–	6	–	2
Western Kentucky	1	–	5	–	1	2	–	6	–	2
East Tennessee State	1	–	6	–	0	2	–	6	–	1
$ – Conference champion

The 1965 Western Kentucky Hilltoppers football team represented Western Kentucky State College (now known as Western Kentucky University) as a member of the Ohio Valley Conference (OVC) during the 1965 NCAA College Division football season. Led by eighth-year head coach Nick Denes, the Hilltoppers compiled an overall record of 2–6–2 with a mark of 1–5–1 in conference play, for seventh place in the OVC. The team's captain was Ken Frick.

== Schedule ==
Date	Opponent	Site	Result	Attendance
September 18	at Akron*	Rubber Bowl; Akron, OH	T 6–6	40,165
September 25	East Tennessee State	Bowling Green, KY	W 15–14	7,000–7,062
October 2	at No. 9 Middle Tennessee	Murfreesboro, TN (rivalry)	L 0–21	8,500
October 9	at Austin Peay	Municipal Stadium; Clarksville, TN	L 6–38	5,800
October 16	Tennessee Tech	Bowling Green, KY	L 6–46	6,500–6,505
October 23	Drake*^{†}	Bowling Green, KY	W 28–21	10,000–10,025
October 30	at Eastern Kentucky	Richmond, KY (rivalry)	L 12–28	11,500
November 6	Morehead State	Bowling Green, KY	L 12–21	5,000–5,012
November 13	at Butler*	Butler Bowl; Indianapolis, IN	L 20–27	5,150
November 20	Murray State	Bowling Green, KY (rivalry)	T 14–14	5,000–5,731
*Non-conference game; ^{†}Homecoming; Rankings from AP Poll released prior to the game
