= 1953 East Tennessee State Buccaneers football team =

American college football season

1953 East Tennessee State Buccaneers football

Burley Bowl champion

Burley Bowl, W 48–12 vs. Emory and Henry
- Conference: Volunteer State Athletic Conference
- Record: 5–4 (2–0 VSAC)
- Head coach: Star Wood (2nd season)
- Home stadium: Memorial Stadium

The 1953 East Tennessee State Buccaneers football team was an American football team that represented East Tennessee State College (ETSC), now known as East Tennessee State University, as a member of the Volunteer State Athletic Conference (VSAC) during the 1953 college football season. Led by second-year head coach Star Wood, the Buccaneers compiled an overall record of 5–4. East Tennessee State defeated Emory and Henry in the Burley Bowl by the score of 48–12.

== Schedule ==
Date	Opponent	Site	Result	Attendance	Source
September 19	Austin Peay*	Memorial Stadium; Johnson City, TN	L 13–21	200	
September 26	at Western Kentucky*	Bowling Green, KY	L 13–32		
October 3	Western Carolina*	Memorial Stadium; Johnson City, TN	W 31–7		
October 10	at Maryville (TN)*	Honaker Field; Maryville, TN	L 20–26		
October 17	Carson–Newman^{†}	Memorial Stadium; Johnson City, TN	W 25–0		
October 31	Tennessee Tech	Memorial Stadium; Johnson City, TN	W 21–13	2,000	
November 7	Appalachian State*	Memorial Stadium; Johnson City, TN	W 21–19	1,700	
November 14	at Middle Tennessee*	Horace Jones Field; Murfreesboro, TN	L 28–34		
November 26	vs. Emory and Henry*	Memorial Stadium; Johnson City, TN (Burley Bowl)	W 48–12	5,000	
*Non-conference game; ^{†}Homecoming; Source:
