= 1965 East Tennessee State Buccaneers football team =

American college football season

1965 East Tennessee State Buccaneers football
- Conference: Ohio Valley Conference
- Record: 2–6–1 (1–6 OVC)
- Head coach: Star Wood (13th season)
- Home stadium: University Stadium

1965 Ohio Valley Conference football standings
	Conf.					Overall
Team	W		L		T	W		L		T
Middle Tennessee $	7	–	0	–	0	10	–	0	–	0
Austin Peay	6	–	1	–	0	8	–	1	–	0
Eastern Kentucky	4	–	2	–	1	4	–	4	–	1
Morehead State	3	–	4	–	0	3	–	6	–	0
Tennessee Tech	3	–	4	–	0	3	–	7	–	0
Murray State	1	–	4	–	2	2	–	6	–	2
Western Kentucky	1	–	5	–	1	2	–	6	–	2
East Tennessee State	1	–	6	–	0	2	–	6	–	1
$ – Conference champion

The 1965 East Tennessee State Buccaneers football team represented East Tennessee State University as a member of the Ohio Valley Conference (OVC) during the 1965 NCAA College Division football season. Led by 13th-year head coach Star Wood, the Buccaneers compiled an overall record of 2–6–1, with a mark of 1–6 in conference play, and finished eighth in the OVC.

== Schedule ==
Date	Opponent	Site	Result	Attendance	Source
September 18	Murray State	University Stadium; Johnson City, TN	W 27–24	6,100	
September 25	at Western Kentucky	Bowling Green, KY	L 14–15	7,000	
October 2	Chattanooga*	University Stadium; Johnson City, TN	T 7–7	6,200	
October 9	Tennessee Tech	University Stadium; Johnson City, TN	L 14–34	5,800	
October 16	Eastern Kentucky	University Stadium; Johnson City, TN	L 0–23	7,500	
October 23	at Wofford*	Synder Field; Spartanburg, SC	W 20–6	6,100	
October 30	at Morehead State	Jayne Stadium; Morehead, KY	L 21–35	2,500	
November 6	Austin Peay	University Stadium; Johnson City, TN	L 7–21	2,100	
November 13	at No. 4 Middle Tennessee	Horace Jones Field; Murfreesboro, TN	L 19–43	7,500	
*Non-conference game; Rankings from AP Poll released prior to the game; Source:
