= Boots Donnelly =

American football player and coach (born 1942)

Biographical details
- Born: October 15, 1942 (age 84); Nashville, Tennessee, U.S.

Playing career
- 1962–1964: Middle Tennessee
- Position: Defensive back

Coaching career (HC unless noted)
- 1967–1973: Father Ryan HS (TN) (assistant)
- 1974–1975: Father Ryan HS (TN)
- 1976: Vanderbilt (offensive backfield)
- 1977–1978: Austin Peay
- 1979–1998: Middle Tennessee

Administrative career (AD unless noted)
- 2000–2005: Middle Tennessee

Head coaching record
- Overall: 154–94–1 (college); 21–2 (high school)
- Tournaments: 7–7 (NCAA D-I-AA playoffs)

Accomplishments and honors

Championships
- 5 OVC (1977, 1985, 1989–1990, 1992)

Awards
- 4× OVC Coach of the Year (1977, 1983, 1985, 1989)
- College Football Hall of Fame; Inducted in 2013 (profile)

James F. "Boots" Donnelly (born October 15, 1942) is an American former football player and coach. He served as the head football coach at Austin Peay State University from 1977 to 1978 and at Middle Tennessee State University (MTSU) from 1979 to 1998, compiling a career college football coaching record of 154–94–1. Donnelly was inducted into the Blue Raider Hall of Fame in 1993. He was inducted into the College Football Hall of Fame as a coach in 2013.

== Playing career ==
Donnelly was a defensive back at MTSU; his playing career culminated with an MTSU victory in the 1964 Grantland Rice Bowl.

== Coaching career ==
Donnelly began his coaching career at his alma mater, Father Ryan High School in Nashville, Tennessee. He served as the head football coach there from 1974 to 1975, tallying a mark of 21–2. His 1974 team went 13–0 and won the Tennessee Class AAA title. In 1976 Donnelly joined the football staff at Vanderbilt University, coaching the offensive backfield under head coach, Fred Pancoast. Donnelly went on to be the head coach at Austin Peay for two seasons, and at MTSU for twenty seasons.

== Later life ==
After the conclusion of his coaching career, Donnelly served as athletic director at MTSU for several years. In 2006, he became CEO of Backfield in Motion, an organization dedicated to fostering academic and athletic abilities among inner city youth. In October 2015, a statue of Donnelly was unveiled on the MTSU campus.

== Head coaching record ==
=== College ===
| Year | Team | Overall | Conference | Standing | Bowl/playoffs |
|---|---|---|---|---|---|
Austin Peay Governors (Ohio Valley Conference) (1977–1978)
| 1977 | Austin Peay | 8–3 | 6–1 | 1st | |
| 1978 | Austin Peay | 6–4 | 3–3 | 4th | |
| Austin Peay: | | 14–7 | 9–4 | | |
Middle Tennessee Blue Raiders (Ohio Valley Conference) (1979–1998)
| 1979 | Middle Tennessee | 1–9 | 1–5 | 6th | |
| 1980 | Middle Tennessee | 2–8 | 2–5 | T–6th | |
| 1981 | Middle Tennessee | 6–5 | 4–4 | T–4th | |
| 1982 | Middle Tennessee | 8–3 | 4–3 | T–3rd | |
| 1983 | Middle Tennessee | 8–2 | 5–2 | T–2nd | |
| 1984 | Middle Tennessee | 11–3 | 5–2 | T–2nd | L NCAA Division I-AA Semifinal |
| 1985 | Middle Tennessee | 11–1 | 7–0 | 1st | L NCAA Division I-AA Quarterfinal |
| 1986 | Middle Tennessee | 6–5 | 4–3 | T–3rd | |
| 1987 | Middle Tennessee | 6–5 | 4–2 | 3rd | |
| 1988 | Middle Tennessee | 7–4 | 4–2 | T–2nd | |
| 1989 | Middle Tennessee | 9–4 | 6–0 | 1st | L NCAA Division I-AA Quarterfinal |
| 1990 | Middle Tennessee | 11–2 | 5–1 | T–1st | L NCAA Division I-AA Quarterfinal |
| 1991 | Middle Tennessee | 9–4 | 6–1 | 2nd | L NCAA Division I-AA Quarterfinal |
| 1992 | Middle Tennessee | 10–3 | 8–0 | 1st | L NCAA Division I-AA Quarterfinal |
| 1993 | Middle Tennessee | 5–6 | 4–4 | T–4th | |
| 1994 | Middle Tennessee | 8–3–1 | 7–1 | 2nd | L NCAA Division I-AA First Round |
| 1995 | Middle Tennessee | 7–4 | 6–2 | 3rd | |
| 1996 | Middle Tennessee | 6–5 | 4–4 | T–4th | |
| 1997 | Middle Tennessee | 4–6 | 2–5 | 6th | |
| 1998 | Middle Tennessee | 5–5 | 5–2 | T–2nd | |
| Middle Tennessee: | | 133–80–1 | 93–48 | | |
| Total: | | 147–87–1 | | | |
National championship Conference title Conference division title or championship game berth
