= 1959 Western Kentucky Hilltoppers football team =

American college football season

1959 Western Kentucky Hilltoppers football
- Conference: Ohio Valley Conference
- Record: 5–4 (3–3 OVC)
- Head coach: Nick Denes (3rd season)
- Captains: Dave Miller; Denny Wedge

1959 Ohio Valley Conference football standings
	Conf.					Overall
Team	W		L		T	W		L		T
No. 3 Middle Tennessee +	5	–	0	–	1	10	–	0	–	1
Tennessee Tech +	5	–	0	–	1	7	–	2	–	2
East Tennessee State	4	–	2	–	0	6	–	3	–	0
Western Kentucky	3	–	3	–	0	5	–	4	–	0
Eastern Kentucky	2	–	4	–	0	3	–	6	–	0
Morehead State	1	–	5	–	0	3	–	6	–	0
Murray State	0	–	6	–	0	0	–	10	–	0
+ – Conference co-champions; Rankings from UPI small college poll

The 1959 Western Kentucky Hilltoppers football team represented Western Kentucky State College (now known as Western Kentucky University) as a member of the Ohio Valley Conference (OVC) during the 1959 college football season. Led by third-year head coach Nick Denes, the Hilltoppers compiled an overall record of 5–4 with a mark of 3–3 in conference play, tying for fourth place in the OVC. The team's captains were Dave Miller and Denny Wedge.

== Schedule ==
Date	Opponent	Site	Result	Attendance
September 15	at Louisville*	Fairgrounds Stadium; Louisville, KY	L 0–19	3,519
September 19	at Southeast Missouri State*	Cape Girardeau, MO	W 13–8	
September 26	East Tennessee State	Bowling Green, KY	L 7–13	
October 3	at No. 12 Middle Tennessee	Horace Jones Field; Murfreesboro, TN (rivalry)	L 2–37	
October 10	at Austin Peay*	Municipal Stadium; Clarksville, TN	W 20–12	
October 17	Tennessee Tech^{†}	Bowling Green, KY	L 19–29	
October 31	at Eastern Kentucky	Richmond, KY (rivalry)	W 14–7	
November 7	Morehead State	Bowling Green, KY	W 27–14	
November 21	Murray State	Cutchin Stadium; Bowling Green, KY (rivalry)	W 21–6	
*Non-conference game; ^{†}Homecoming; Rankings from UPI Poll released prior to the game
