= 1952 Middle Tennessee Blue Raiders football team =

American college football season

1952 Middle Tennessee Blue Raiders football
- Conference: Ohio Valley Conference
- Record: 6–5 (2–2 OVC)
- Head coach: Charles M. Murphy (6th season)
- Captains: J. Lofton; John R. Smith
- Home stadium: Horace Jones Field

1952 Ohio Valley Conference football standings
	Conf.					Overall
Team	W		L		T	W		L		T
Western Kentucky +	4	–	1	–	0	9	–	1	–	0
Tennessee Tech +	4	–	1	–	0	9	–	2	–	0
Murray State	3	–	2	–	0	4	–	4	–	0
Middle Tennessee	2	–	2	–	0	6	–	5	–	0
Eastern Kentucky	0	–	3	–	1	3	–	4	–	1
Morehead State	0	–	4	–	1	1	–	6	–	1
$ – Conference champion

The 1952 Middle Tennessee Blue Raiders football team represented the Middle Tennessee State College—now known as Middle Tennessee State University—as a member of the Ohio Valley Conference (OVC) during the 1952 college football season. Led by sixth-year head coach Charles M. Murphy, the Blue Raiders compiled an overall record of 6–5 with a mark of 2–2 in conference play, placing fourth in the OVC. The team's captains were J. Lofton and John R. Smith.

== Schedule ==
Date	Time	Opponent	Site	Result	Attendance	Source
September 14		at Carson–Newman*	Jefferson City, TN	W 19–7		
September 21		at Western Kentucky	Bowling Green, KY (rivalry)	L 19–33		
September 27		Sewart Air Force Base*	Horace Jones Field; Murfreesboro, TN	W 18–0		
October 3		at Chattanooga*	Chamberlain Field; Chattanooga, TN	L 13–39		
October 11		Troy State*	Horace Jones Field; Murfreesboro, TN (rivalry)	W 33–7		
October 18		Morehead State	Horace Jones Field; Murfreesboro, TN	W 27–6		
October 25		Emory and Henry*	Emory, VA	L 7–27		
November 1		Florence State*	Horace Jones Field; Murfreesboro, TN	L 18–34		
November 8		Murray State	Horace Jones Field; Murfreesboro, TN	L 13–20		
November 15	7:00 p.m.	at East Tennessee State*	State College Stadium; Johnson City, TN	W 28–14	2,500	
November 27	2:00 p.m.	at Tennessee Tech	Overall Field; Cookeville, TN	W 19–7	8,500	
*Non-conference game; All times are in Central time
