= 1956 Middle Tennessee Blue Raiders football team =

American college football season

1956 Middle Tennessee Blue Raiders football

OVC champion

Refrigerator Bowl, L 13–27 vs. Sam Houston State
- Conference: Ohio Valley Conference
- Record: 7–3 (5–0 OVC)
- Head coach: Charles M. Murphy (10th season)
- Captains: T. Sweeney; Ben Hurt
- Home stadium: Horace Jones Field

1956 Ohio Valley Conference football standings
	Conf.					Overall
Team	W		L		T	W		L		T
Middle Tennessee $	5	–	0	–	0	7	–	2	–	0
Murray State	4	–	1	–	0	6	–	4	–	0
Western Kentucky	2	–	3	–	0	5	–	4	–	0
Tennessee Tech	2	–	3	–	0	5	–	4	–	1
Eastern Kentucky	2	–	3	–	0	4	–	5	–	0
Morehead State	0	–	5	–	0	2	–	6	–	0
$ – Conference champion

The 1956 Middle Tennessee Blue Raiders football team represented the Middle Tennessee State College—now known as Middle Tennessee State University—as a member of the Ohio Valley Conference (OVC) during the 1956 college football season. Led by tenth-year head coach Charles M. Murphy, the Blue Raiders compiled a record an overall record of 7–3 with a mark of 5–0 in conference play, winning the OVC title. Middle Tennessee was invited to the Refrigerator Bowl, where they lost to Sam Houston State. The team's captains were T. Sweeney and Ben Hurt.

== Schedule ==
Date	Opponent	Site	Result	Attendance	Source
September 15	at Morris Harvey*	Charleston, WV	L 0–6		
September 21	Austin Peay*	Horace Jones Field; Murfreesboro, TN	W 38–20		
September 29	at Western Kentucky	Bowling Green, KY (rivalry)	W 7–6		
October 6	Eastern Kentucky	Horace Jones Field; Murfreesboro, TN	W 26–19		
October 13	Morehead State	Horace Jones Field; Murfreesboro, TN	W 20–12		
October 27	at Vanderbilt*	Dudley Field; Nashville, TN	L 13–23		
November 3	Murray State	Horace Jones Field; Murfreesboro, TN	W 39–7		
November 10	at East Tennessee State*	State College Stadium; Johnson City, TN	W 20–6		
November 22	at Tennessee Tech	Overhill Field; Cookeville, TN	W 26–6		
December 1	vs. Sam Houston State*	Reitz Bowl; Evansville, IN (Refrigerator Bowl)	L 13–27	3,000	
*Non-conference game

== After the season ==
=== NFL draft ===
The following Blue Raiders were selected in the 1957 NFL draft following the season.

Round	Pick	Player	Position	NFL club
7	84	Jerry DeLucca	Tackle	Chicago Bears
10	116	Jerry Hurst	End	San Francisco 49ers
