= 1955 Western Kentucky Hilltoppers football team =

American college football season

1955 Western Kentucky Hilltoppers football
- Conference: Ohio Valley Conference
- Record: 3–6 (1–4 OVC)
- Head coach: Jack Clayton (8th season)
- Captains: Jerry Nassano; Vernon "Tank" Wilson

The 1955 Western Kentucky Hilltoppers football team represented Western Kentucky State College (now known as Western Kentucky University) as a member of the Ohio Valley Conference (OVC) during the 1955 college football season. Led by eighth-year head coach Jack Clayton, the Hilltoppers compiled an overall record of 3–6 with a mark of 1–4 in conference play, placing fifth in the OVC. The team's captains were Jerry Nassano and Vernon "Tank" Wilson.

1955 Ohio Valley Conference football standings
| | Conf. | | | | | Overall |
| Team | W | | L | | T | W | | L | | T |
|---|---|---|---|---|---|---|---|---|---|---|
| Tennessee Tech $ | 5 | – | 0 | – | 0 | 7 | – | 3 | – | 0 |
| Middle Tennessee | 4 | – | 1 | – | 0 | 7 | – | 2 | – | 1 |
| Eastern Kentucky | 3 | – | 2 | – | 0 | 5 | – | 4 | – | 1 |
| Murray State | 2 | – | 3 | – | 0 | 6 | – | 4 | – | 0 |
| Western Kentucky | 1 | – | 4 | – | 0 | 3 | – | 6 | – | 0 |
| Morehead State | 0 | – | 5 | – | 0 | 0 | – | 9 | – | 0 |
$ – Conference champion

== Schedule ==
| Date | Opponent | Site | Result | Attendance | Source |
|---|---|---|---|---|---|
| September 24 | East Tennessee State* | Bowling Green, KY | W 20–7 | | |
| October 1 | at Middle Tennessee | Murfreesboro, TN (rivalry) | L 13–25 | | |
| October 8 | Morehead State | Bowling Green, KY | W 12–7 | | |
| October 15 | at Northeast Louisiana State* | Brown Stadium; Monroe, LA | L 9–21 | | |
| October 22 | Tennessee Tech | Bowling Green, KY | L 7–19 | | |
| October 29 | at Louisville* | Parkway Field; Louisville, KY | L 0–20 | | |
| November 5 | at Eastern Kentucky | Richmond, KY (rivalry) | L 0–7 | | |
| November 12 | Evansville* | Bowling Green, KY | W 46–6 | | |
| November 19 | Murray State^{†} | Bowling Green, KY (rivalry) | L 12–28 | 5,000 | |
*Non-conference game; ^{†}Homecoming
