= Marv Brown =

American football player (1930–2009)

No. 42
- Position: Halfback

Personal information
- Born: August 15, 1930; Marshall, Texas, U.S.
- Died: December 7, 2009 (aged 79); New Caney, Texas, U.S.
- Listed height: 5 ft 8 in (1.73 m)
- Listed weight: 150 lb (68 kg)

Career information
- High school: Waco (TX)
- College: Tarleton State; Texas A&M–Commerce
- NFL draft: 1953: 25th round, 301st overall pick

Career history
- Detroit Lions (1957)

Awards and highlights
- NFL champion (1957)

Career NFL statistics
- Rushing yards: 6
- Rushing average: 3
- Return yards: 122
- Stats at Pro Football Reference

Marvin Clifford Brown (August 15, 1930 – December 7, 2009) was a National Football League (NFL) halfback with the Detroit Lions in 1957. He played high school football for the Waco Lions in Waco, Texas and William Adams High School in Alice, Texas. He played for the Texas A&M Commerce Lions and get drafted in the 25th round (301st overall) by Detroit Lions in 1953. Brown died December 7, 2009, of pancreatic cancer.

== Life ==
Marvin Brown grew up in the Methodist Orphanage home in Waco, Texas from age 5-17. The home took Brown and his sister Alice in after they found them digging through trash cans in the area. Their mother was not able to take care of them and they were living with their grandfather who worked security at night and slept during the day. While at the Orphanage, Marvin met and was coached by J. M White. White had a large influence on Marvin's life. Brown ran away from the orphanage at age 17 and White got Marvin a scholarship at Tarleton State University, where he was voted best player in Tarleton History, was All Conference three years, led the conference in rushing and punt returns and intercepted 10 passes. He was voted most valuable player and Jr. College All American. He was inducted into Tarelton's Hall of Fame later in life. From there he went to East Taxas State University (Now Texas A & M Commerce) on a football scholarship and played for "Catfish" Smith, who once said Marvin was the greatest football player he ever coached. Marvin received his Bachelors and Masters from this University. While at East Texas State he was voted Most Valuable Player in the 1953 Tangerine Bowl, he was ranked 9th nationally in scoring, had the longest run of 107 yards in one game (a record that stood for years), was an All American and still holds 9 records at the school in football. In track, he ran the 100-yard dash in 9.5 seconds and was all conference in the 100 and 220. Brown was inducted into East Texas Hall of Fame in the 1970s.

Marvin was in the Air Force from 1953-1956 and completed his flight training in 1956 and then played for the Detroit Lions for one year and then served in the Vietnam War from 1968-1969. From 1958 to 1991, Brown was a commercial airline pilot, flying for Braniff for 16 years and Continental Airline for seven years. Brown was also a world-class tennis player. He took up tennis at the age of 45 and was consistently ranked in the top three seniors in the state of Texas, a top-10 senior player in the United States and a top-20 player in the world. He represented the United States in the Senior Division of the World Cup for a number of years in New Zealand, Austria, and Turkey along with his teammate Captain Russel Seymore.

== Career ==
Brown's only season in the league was in 1957.

== Stats ==
He played in four games and had 6 total rushing yards on 2 attempts.
