= 1955 East Carolina Pirates football team =

American college football season

1955 East Carolina Pirates football
- Conference: North State Conference
- Record: 4–5 (3–2 NSC)
- Head coach: Jack Boone (4th season)
- Home stadium: College Stadium

1955 North State Conference football standings
	Conf.					Overall
Team	W		L		T	W		L		T
Lenoir Rhyne $	6	–	0	–	0	10	–	0	–	0
Catawba *	4	–	2	–	0	6	–	4	–	0
East Carolina	3	–	2	–	0	4	–	5	–	0
Appalachian State	3	–	3	–	0	3	–	6	–	0
Elon	2	–	4	–	0	3	–	7	–	0
Western Carolina *	1	–	4	–	0	1	–	8	–	1
Guilford	0	–	4	–	0	0	–	7	–	1
$ – Conference champion; * – Western Carolina forfeited a win over Catawba.

The 1955 East Carolina Pirates football team was an American football team that represented East Carolina College (now known as East Carolina University) as a member of the North State Conference during the 1955 college football season. In their fourth season under head coach Jack Boone, the team compiled a 4–5 record.

== Schedule ==
Date	Opponent	Site	Result	Attendance	Source
September 11	Norfolk NAS*	College Stadium; Greenville, NC	W 6–0	4,500	
September 17	at West Chester*	Wayne Field; West Chester, PA	L 0–9	4,000	
September 24	Lenoir Rhyne	College Stadium; Greenville, NC	L 6–7		
October 1	at Catawba	Shuford Stadium; Salisbury, NC	L 7–13		
October 8	Elon	College Stadium; Greenville, NC	W 13–0	8,000	
October 15	at Western Carolina	Memorial Stadium; Cullowhee, NC	W 14–6		
October 22	at East Tennessee State*	University Stadium; Johnson City, TN	L 20–34	3,000	
October 29	Appalachian State	College Stadium; Greenville, NC	W 13–0		
November 5	Tampa*	College Stadium; Greenville, NC	L 14–33		
*Non-conference game
