= 1952 Western Kentucky Hilltoppers football team =

American college football season

1952 Western Kentucky Hilltoppers football

OVC co-champion Refrigerator Bowl champion

Refrigerator Bowl, W 34–19 vs. Arkansas State
- Conference: Ohio Valley Conference
- Record: 9–1 (4–1 OVC)
- Head coach: Jack Clayton (5th season)
- Captains: Will Price; Willie Watson

1952 Ohio Valley Conference football standings
	Conf.					Overall
Team	W		L		T	W		L		T
Western Kentucky +	4	–	1	–	0	9	–	1	–	0
Tennessee Tech +	4	–	1	–	0	9	–	2	–	0
Murray State	3	–	2	–	0	4	–	4	–	0
Middle Tennessee	2	–	2	–	0	6	–	5	–	0
Eastern Kentucky	0	–	3	–	1	3	–	4	–	1
Morehead State	0	–	4	–	1	1	–	6	–	1
$ – Conference champion

The 1952 Western Kentucky Hilltoppers football team represented Western Kentucky State College (now known as Western Kentucky University) in the 1952 college football season. They were coached by Jack Clayton and shared their first Ohio Valley Conference football championship and won their first bowl game, the Refrigerator Bowl. The team was led by college division AP All-American and All-OVC Quarterback Jimmy Feix and matched the school record for most wins set in 1922. R. E. Simpson, Marvin Satterly, Gene McFadden, and Max Stevens were also named to the All-OVC team. The team's captains were Dave Miller and Denny Wedge.

== Schedule ==
Date	Time	Opponent	Site	Result	Attendance	Source
September 20		Middle Tennessee	Bowling Green, KY (rivalry)	W 33–19		
September 27		at Evansville*	Evansville, IN	W 39–0		
October 11		at Morehead State	Morehead, KY	W 39–7		
October 18		Northeast Louisiana State*	Bowling Green, KY	W 42–27	3,500	
October 25	8:00 p.m.	at Tennessee Tech	Overall Field; Cookeville, TN	L 13–21	6,000	
November 1		Delta State*	Bowling Green, KY	W 35–13		
November 8		Eastern Kentucky^{†}	Bowling Green, KY (rivalry)	W 48–6		
November 15		Southeast Missouri State*	Bowling Green, KY	W 41–0		
November 22		at Murray State	Cutchin Stadium; Murray, KY (rivalry)	W 12–7		
December 7		vs. Arkansas State*	Reitz Bowl; Evansville, IN (Refrigerator Bowl)	W 34–19	9,000	
*Non-conference game; ^{†}Homecoming; All times are in Central time
