= 1965 Middle Tennessee Blue Raiders football team =

American college football season

1965 Middle Tennessee Blue Raiders football

OVC champion
- Conference: Ohio Valley Conference

Ranking
- Coaches: No. 3
- AP: No. 2
- Record: 10–0 (7–0 OVC)
- Head coach: Charles M. Murphy (19th season)
- Captains: K. Atchley; W. Randolph
- Home stadium: Horace Jones Field

1965 Ohio Valley Conference football standings
	Conf.					Overall
Team	W		L		T	W		L		T
Middle Tennessee $	7	–	0	–	0	10	–	0	–	0
Austin Peay	6	–	1	–	0	8	–	1	–	0
Eastern Kentucky	4	–	2	–	1	4	–	4	–	1
Morehead State	3	–	4	–	0	3	–	6	–	0
Tennessee Tech	3	–	4	–	0	3	–	7	–	0
Murray State	1	–	4	–	2	2	–	6	–	2
Western Kentucky	1	–	5	–	1	2	–	6	–	2
East Tennessee State	1	–	6	–	0	2	–	6	–	1
$ – Conference champion

The 1965 Middle Tennessee Blue Raiders football team represented Middle Tennessee State University—as a member of the Ohio Valley Conference (OVC) during the 1965 NCAA College Division football season. Led by 19th-year head coach Charles M. Murphy, the Blue Raiders compiled a record an overall record of 10–0 with a mark of 7–0 in conference play, winning the OVC title. The team's captains were K. Atchley and W. Randolph.

== Schedule ==
Date	Opponent	Rank	Site	Result	Attendance	Source
September 18	at Florence State*		Florence, AL	W 44–14	4,500	
September 25	Tennessee–Martin*		Horace Jones Field; Murfreesboro, TN	W 24–14	7,000	
October 2	Western Kentucky	No. 9	Horace Jones Field; Murfreesboro, TN (rivalry)	W 21–0	8,500	
October 9	at Eastern Kentucky	No. 5	Richmond, KY	W 14–10	10,000	
October 16	Chattanooga*	No. 3	Horace Jones Field; Murfreesboro, TN	W 30–7	10,000	
October 23	at Morehead State	No. 5	Jayne Stadium; Morehead, KY	W 30–28	4,500	
October 30	at Austin Peay	No. 3	Clarksville Municipal Stadium; Clarksville, TN	W 24–20	11,000	
November 6	at Murray State	No. 3	Cutchin Stadium; Murray, KY	W 28–24	8,000	
November 13	East Tennessee State	No. 4	Horace Jones Field; Murfreesboro, TN	W 43–19	10,000	
November 25	Tennessee Tech	No. 2	Horace Jones Field; Murfreesboro, TN	W 28–21	10,500	
*Non-conference game; Rankings from AP Poll released prior to the game
