= Middle Tennessee Blue Raiders =

Intercollegiate sports teams of Middle Tennessee State University

- University: Middle Tennessee State University
- Nickname: Blue Raiders
- NCAA: Division I (FBS)
- Conference: Conference USA
- Athletic director: Chris Massaro
- Location: Murfreesboro, Tennessee, U.S.
- Varsity teams: 17
- Football stadium: Johnny "Red" Floyd Stadium
- Basketball arena: Murphy Center
- Baseball stadium: Reese Smith Jr. Field
- Soccer stadium: Dean A. Hayes Stadium
- Other venues: Alumni Memorial Gym; Buck Bouldin Tennis Center
- Colors: Royal blue and white
- Mascot: Lightning
- Website: goblueraiders.com

The Middle Tennessee Blue Raiders are the men's and women's athletic teams at Middle Tennessee State University, in Murfreesboro, Tennessee, United States. MT athletic teams participate in NCAA Division I (Bowl Subdivision in football) in Conference USA. MT competed in the Ohio Valley Conference until 2000, and the Sun Belt Conference until 2013.

== Nickname ==
The nickname 'Blue Raiders' was coined by an MTSU football player, Charles Sarver, in 1934 Daily News Journal contest. No official nickname existed prior to 1934, when teams were called "Normalites," "Teachers," and "Pedagogues".

The university's athletic teams simply refer to the school as "Middle Tennessee" or "MT", abandoning the words "State University".

== Sports sponsored ==
Men's sports	Women's sports
Baseball	Basketball
Basketball	Cross country
Cross country	Golf
Football	Soccer
Golf	Softball
Tennis	Tennis
Track and field^{†}	Track and field^{†}
	Volleyball
† – Track and field includes both indoor and outdoor

A member of Conference USA, Middle Tennessee sponsors teams in eight men's and nine women's NCAA sanctioned sports.

=== Baseball ===
Conference USA logo in Middle Tennessee's colors

The baseball team has won 16 conference titles and for the last 37 seasons they had been coached by two men. The last 23 of those years Steve Peterson has been at the helm. Middle Tennessee has made 13 NCAA Tournament appearances. Their best turnout was in 1982 when the Blue Raiders fell one game short of making the College World Series in Omaha, Neb. In 2009, Rawley Bishop, Nathan Hines, and Bryce Brentz all broke several team and league records to lead the Blue Raiders to the 2009 Sun Belt Conference regular season and tournament titles. They also set a school record with 44 wins, going 44–18 on the season. The Blue Raiders were chosen for the Louisville Regional.

They won their first game against in-state rival Vanderbilt 5–4, but lost to host Louisville in their second game 3–2 and were eliminated by Vanderbilt 6–0 in game three. In 2010, outfielder Bryce Brentz was selected in the supplemental first round with the 36th overall pick by the Boston Red Sox, becoming the second highest Blue Raider picked in the MLB First-Year Player Draft. The highest was pitcher Dewon Brazelton who was selected third overall by the Tampa Bay Rays in the 2001 MLB First-Year Player Draft. In the summer of 2012, Steve Peterson decided to retire. Peterson and John Stanford, the previous coach before him, had been the only two coaches in the past 38 years. Peterson retires with an all-time career record of 791–637–3. Peterson did a lot more for the program than just win ballgames. He helped carry on annual events such as the yearly Fish Fry that is held every October and was started by Coach John Stanford. Also, he carried on the tradition of the Groundhog Day Luncheon that takes place every February. Peterson also was the prime leader in fundraising for the renovations that took place to Reese Smith Jr. Field. In addition to fundraising enough money for increased seating at Reese Smith Jr. Field, Peterson raised enough money for a clubhouse. The Stephen B. Smith clubhouse was built in 1998 and has served as the team's locker room for the past 14 seasons.

=== Men's basketball ===
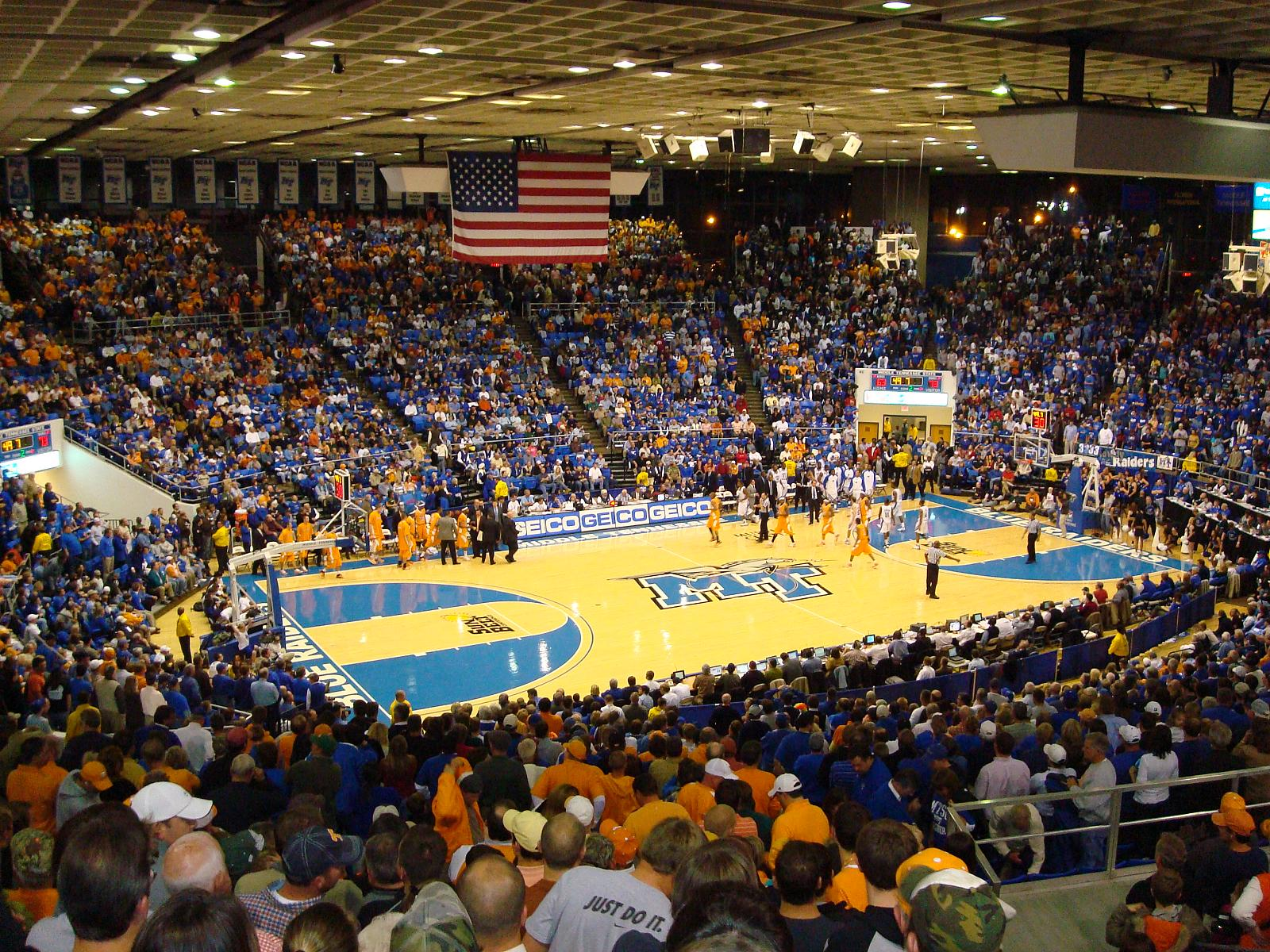
Murphy Center, home of the men's and women's basketball teams (November 2008)

The men's basketball program has had staggered history. 1975 saw Middle Tennessee and head coach Jimmy Earle make their first NCAA Tournament. The team was selected for the Mideast Regional, but fell in the first round to Oregon State 78–67. After one more first round bow out, the Raiders, then coached by Stan Simpson, won their first NCAA Tournament game as an 11-seed, the highest seeding the school has received in the tournament. In the historic Memorial Gymnasium in Nashville, Tenn., Middle Tennessee beat Kentucky 50–44 in the Mideast Regional. The Raiders would lose to Louisville in the second round, who won the regional title that year and advanced to the Final Four.

Then 1985 saw Middle Tennessee embark on a string of five consecutive seasons with a post-season berth, either in the NCAA Tournament or the National Invitation Tournament. Their best post-season run was in the 1988 NIT. In the first round coach Bruce Stewart's Raiders hosted in-state rival Tennessee and beat the Volunteers 85–80 in front of a full-house in the Murphy Center. Four nights later Middle Tennessee hosted another Southeastern Conference foe Georgia. Ty Baynham and Randy Henry led Middle Tennessee to another victory, this time 69–59. After beating the Bulldogs, the Blue Raiders hosted Boston College for the right to go to Madison Square Garden and the NIT Semifinals. However Murphy's Magic ran out, and the Eagles defeated Middle Tennessee 78–69. The following season the Blue Raiders once again made the NCAA Tournament. Earning a 13-seed, the Raiders defeated the Florida State Seminoles 97–83. Middle Tennessee was down by 17 (67–50) with 16 minutes left in the game. Freshman Mike Buck put the team on his shoulders at that point, and with a career high 26 points, led the Raiders on a 47–16 run to end the game and advance the team to the round of 32. Middle Tennessee's dream season would end in the second round at the hands of the Virginia Cavaliers with a 104–88 loss. After Stewart was let go amid NCAA rules violations after the 1990–91 season, the Blue Raiders enjoyed only modest success until the 2011–12 season.

Coach Kermit Davis broke the all-time coaching wins record, previously held by Earle, with a 68–56 win over Ole Miss on December 21. The win was especially sweet for Davis. Not only is he now the winningest coach in Blue Raiders history, but he also graduated from the Rebels' biggest rival, Mississippi State. On January 26, Middle Tennessee beat Troy 71–58 to earn their 20th win of the season, the first time the school had reached that mark since the 1990–91 season. And on February 18 the Blue Raiders defeated Florida Atlantic to earn their 24th win and break the school's single season wins record. The team finished the regular season 25–5 overall and 14–2 in the Sun Belt Conference, earning them their first ever outright championship of the league.

On March 18, 2016, the 15th seeded Blue Raiders defeated 2nd seeded Michigan State in the opening round of the Midwest Region of the 2016 NCAA men's tournament, becoming the eighth #15 seed to win a game in the history of the tournament. The Blue Raiders lost in the second round to 10th seed Syracuse on March 20.

=== Women's basketball ===
The women's basketball team, currently coached by Rick Insell, has appeared several times in the NCAA and WNIT basketball tournaments, dating back to the 1970s. The Blue Raiders won the Sun Belt Conference championships in 2005, 2006, 2007, 2009, 2010 and 2012, then with Conference USA in 2013, 2014, 2023, and 2024, all receiving the conference's automatic berth in the NCAA women's tournament. The MTSU Women's team has been home to the NCAA's leading scorer for two recent consecutive seasons: Amber Holt in 2008, and Alysha Clark in 2009. In Rick Insell's tenure, he has had two 30+ win seasons, each going undefeated in conference play and winning an NCAA Tournament game (2007 and 2024). The Lady Raiders also had one of the longest home winning streaks in the NCAA, spanning 30 games between March 2021 to November 2023. In recent years, the 2023-2024 season was arguably the greatest in the Lady Raider's history. There were multiple school and Conference USA records broken with the addition to multiple players hitting career accolades, such as 2000 and multiple 1000 point scorers, as well as rebounding and other shooting records broken as well. Also, the Lady Raiders held a 20-game winning streak, sweeping Conference USA in the regular and post seasons by an average winning margin over 21 points. The Lady Raiders defeated #5 seed Louisville in a comeback win of the first round of the 2024 NCAA Women's Tournament. The 18-point comeback was tied for the 3rd largest in NCAA Women's Tournament history. Their long winning streak was ended by defending national champions LSU in the second round.

On January 23rd, 2026, Rick Insell became the 6th active head coach to reach 500 wins. He also became the first head coach in basketball history to win 500 games both at the NCAA D1 and high school levels each.

=== Football ===
Middle Tennessee has had 15 head coaches including Johnny "Red" Floyd, the man who the football stadium is named after. The football team has won 12 conference titles, the most recent being in 2006. That year, the Blue Raiders won their second Sun Belt Conference championship and received a bid to play in the Motor City Bowl in Detroit, Mich., the program's first major FBS (Formerly Division I-A) bowl game. In 2009 the team became the first Sun Belt Conference team to reach 10 wins in a single season. The Raiders finished the season 10–3 with their first bowl win over Southern Mississippi in the New Orleans Bowl. In recent years, Rick Stockstill served as the head coach for MTSU football from 2006 to 2023, compiling a record of 113-111. During his tenure, he led the Blue Raiders to 10 bowl games, with a 4-6 record in those appearances. In addition to the New Orleans Bowl (2009), he won the Camellia Bowl (2017), and Bahamas Bowl (2021) and Hawaii Bowl (2022). His leadership brought consistency to MTSU, with eight seasons finishing in the top two of their conference standings. Stockstill was fired in 2023 after a 4-8 season. The Blue Raiders are currently led by Derek Mason.

=== Men's golf ===
The men's golf team has won 20 conference championships:

- Ohio Valley Conference (16): 1956, 1958, 1960, 1961, 1962, 1963, 1964, 1966, 1967, 1974, 1978, 1994, 1995, 1996, 1998, 2000
- Sun Belt Conference (1): 2009
- Conference USA (2): 2018, 2019, 2021

They won the NCAA Division II Championship in 1965 while Gary Head (1963) and Larry Gilbert (1965) won individual national titles.

The 2008 team advanced to the NCAA tournament final round (16 teams) and finished ranked 15th in the nation.

=== Track ===
The track program has a storied history including 43 conference titles, 18 NCAA top-25 finishes and 80 All-American awards. The program has been led since 1965 by legendary coach Dean Hayes.

=== Volleyball ===
The women's volleyball program - which plays its games in Alumni Memorial Gym - has developed into a national power with Sun Belt Conference championships in 2006, 2007, 2009 and 2010; and NCAA tournament bids in 2006, 2007, 2008, 2009, 2010 and 2011. In 2006 the Blue Raiders advanced to the NCAA tournament second round and followed that up in 2007 with a "sweet 16" appearance to conclude the best season in team history.

The Blue Raiders hosted the 2013 Conference USA Volleyball Championship at Alumni Memorial Gym, winning the bid to host in Middle Tennessee's first year in C-USA.

== Club sports ==
MT fields teams in club sports such as rugby union, ice hockey, men's soccer, and inline hockey. These "club sports" are not sanctioned by the university, though each team does receive funding as a student organization. They are also authorized to use school logos, wordmarks, and identities. These teams do not compete at the NCAA level, though they do compete against other colleges and universities within unofficial intercollegiate organizations.

MT also has an equestrian team which competes in the Intercollegiate Horse Show Association in both huntseat and western division. Though a club team, the members have won several individual national championships and were as a team the 2003 National Western Reserve Champions.

Additionally, the MTSU Wrestling club team has become a nationally successful program, placing within the top 8 of the National Collegiate Wrestling Association (NCWA) in 2014 (6th), 2015 (2nd), and 2016 (8th).

== Championships ==
MT has won two NCAA national championships in team sports: golf (1965) and men's tennis doubles (2007). However, eight individuals have won national championships. All were in golf or track. The most recent of these came in 2021 when Kigen Chemadi won the NCAA 3000-meter steeplechase title.

== Traditions and music ==
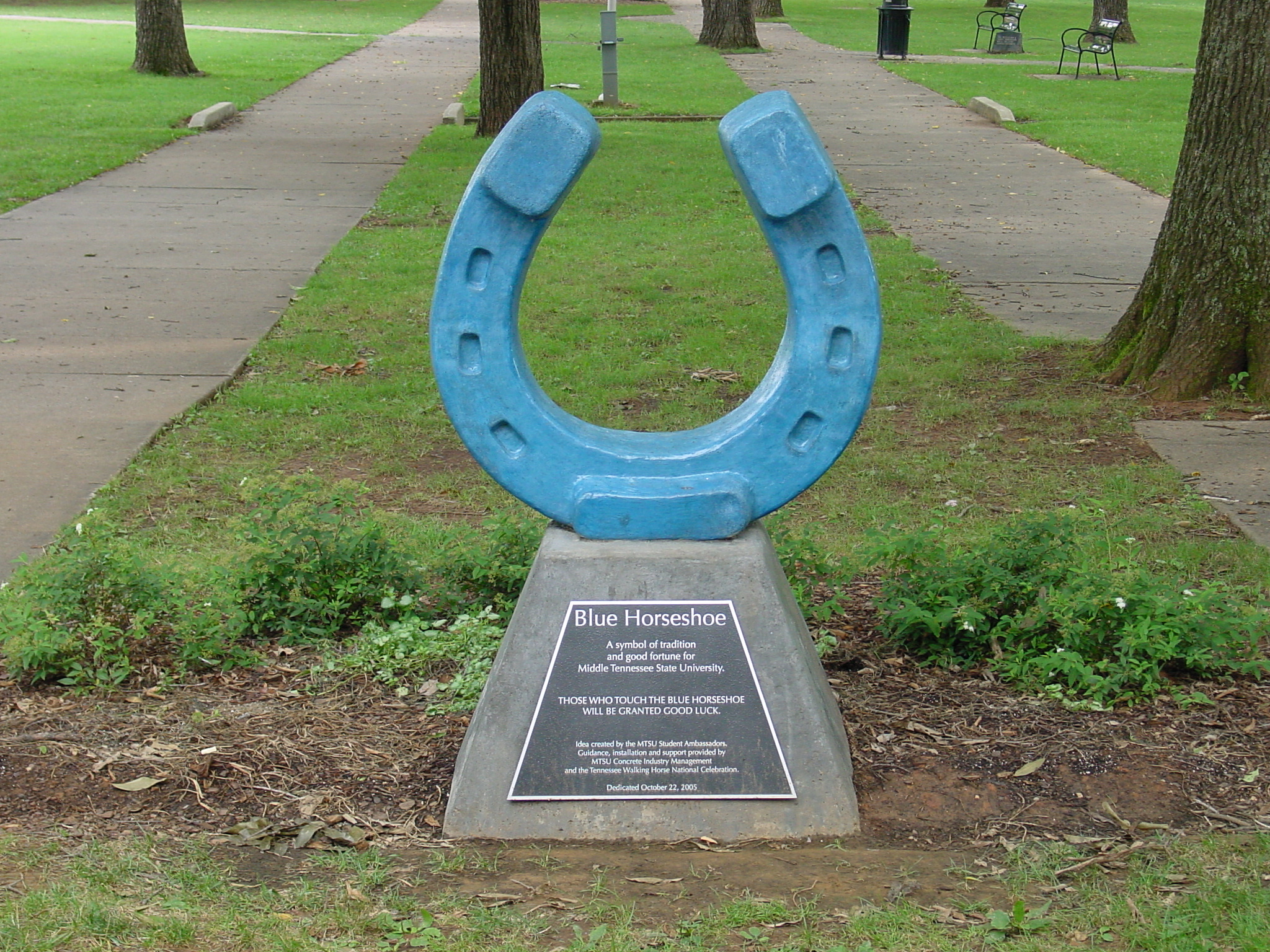
Lucky blue horseshoe, located outside Peck Hall

The university recognizes two songs as its official songs, both simply titled "Alma Mater" and "Fight Song". Several other songs are associated with the athletic department, such as the "Tennessee Waltz", which is played at the end of any athletic event by the Band of Blue or pep band.

=== Alma maters ===
In 1912, student William J. McConnell wrote the first school song titled, "Hail, M.T.N!" The music is the 19th-century Russian national anthem, God Save the Tsar!, composed by Alexei Lvov. When the normal school became Middle Tennessee State Teacher's College, the abbreviations "M.T.N." were substituted with "S.T.C."

During the golden anniversary in 1961, Charles Douglas Williams, graduate in 1953, wrote "Alma Mater", an original composition musically and lyrically. The state college adopted the new piece as its alma mater. The song is played before every football game and sung during commencement exercises.

=== Fight songs ===
The original fight song of MTSU is "Blue Raiders Ride!" The march, written by Paul Yoder, opens with a traditional drum roll and a trumpet fanfare that closely resembles Dixie, which was played as a fight sung up until then, tying in the Confederate symbolism of the school's mascot, the Raider. The march is 148 bpm in the key of B-flat.

On September 10, 2011, the day before the centennial of MTSU, the Blue Raiders hosted the Georgia Tech Yellow Jackets for the largest crowd to fill Johnny "Red" Floyd Stadium. As part of the official Centennial Celebration, the Band of Blue performed Blue Raiders Ride!, an arrangement of Happy Birthday, and The Stars and Stripes Forever. Because of the positive crowd response, Blue Raiders Ride! became part of the regular pre-game performance.

A new fight song was adopted in 1993, featuring a cheer. The tune and melody are similar to that of On, On, U of K.

== Facilities ==
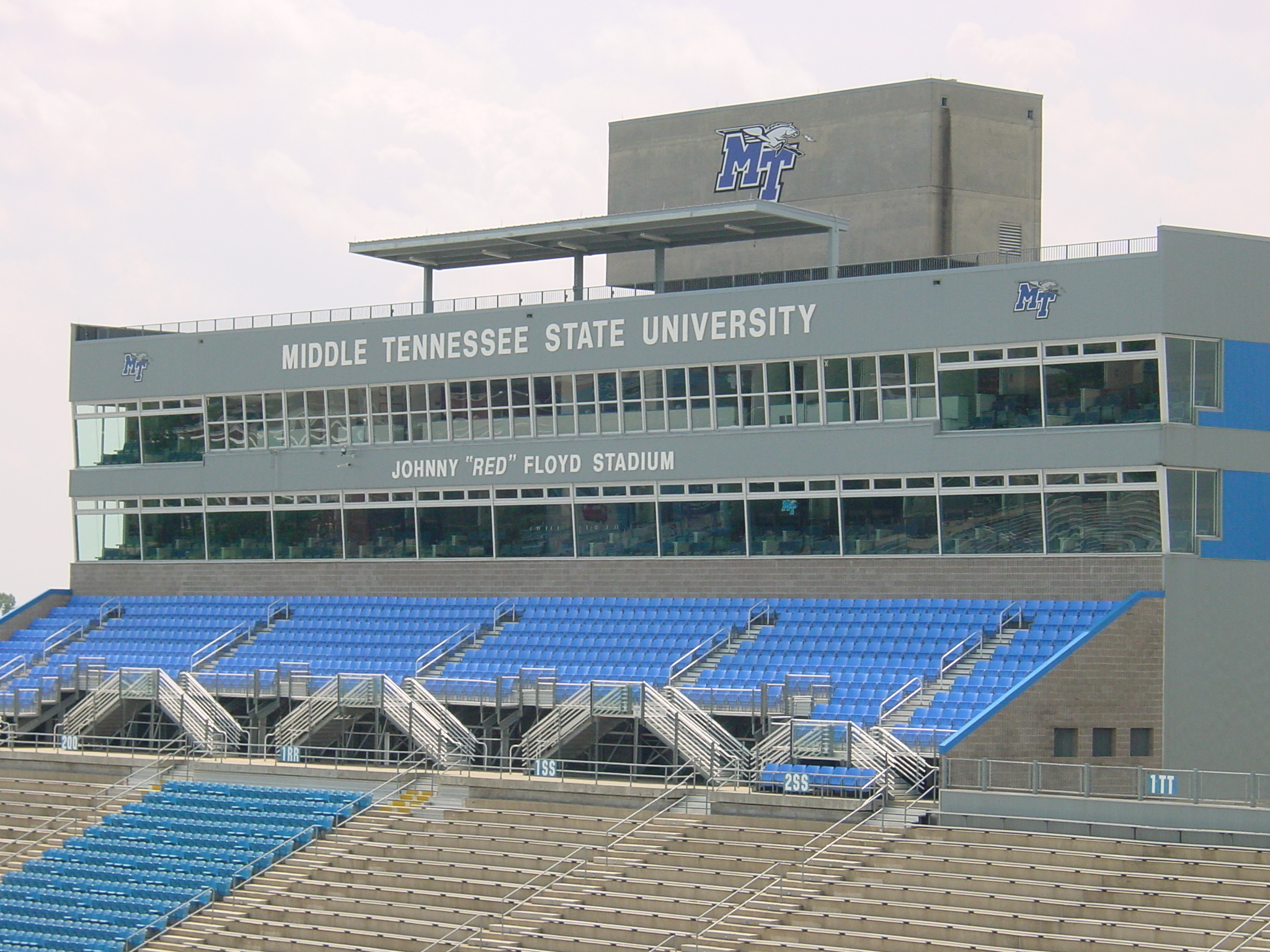
Pressbox at Johnny "Red" Floyd Stadium

The university's main athletics building, the Charles M. Murphy Center, lies on the northwest corner of MTSU's campus. Inside the Murphy Center is Monte Hale basketball arena, which seats 11,520. The Murphy Center also features athletic offices, classrooms, axillary gyms, and an indoor track.

Johnny "Red" Floyd Stadium, named after a former MTSU football coach, lies adjacent to the Murphy Center. The stadium features 31,788 seats and a Sportexe PowerBlade playing surface, installed in 2006.

MTSU also features many smaller stadiums for various other sports. MTSU's baseball stadium, Reese Smith Jr. Field, was recently renovated in 2008. It has 3,000 seats. The MTSU softball stadium, located next to the Recreation Center, was renovated in 2006. The stadium seats over 1,000 people. The Dean Hayes Track and Soccer Field, named for the former MTSU track coach, lies on the northern edge of campus. Its seating capacity is 1,500.

Because of MTSU's central location in the state, the athletic facilities at MTSU are the site of many Tennessee state high school championship games and matches.

MTSU broke ground on its new $66 million "Student-Athlete Performance Center" in January 2023. This facility is designed to enhance training and development for student-athletes across all sports. It will include advanced training spaces, rehabilitation areas, nutrition stations, and academic support facilities. The center aims to improve both athletic and academic success, making MTSU more competitive in recruiting and student-athlete wellness. It represents a significant investment in the future of MTSU athletics and its student-athletes' overall experience.

== Mascot ==
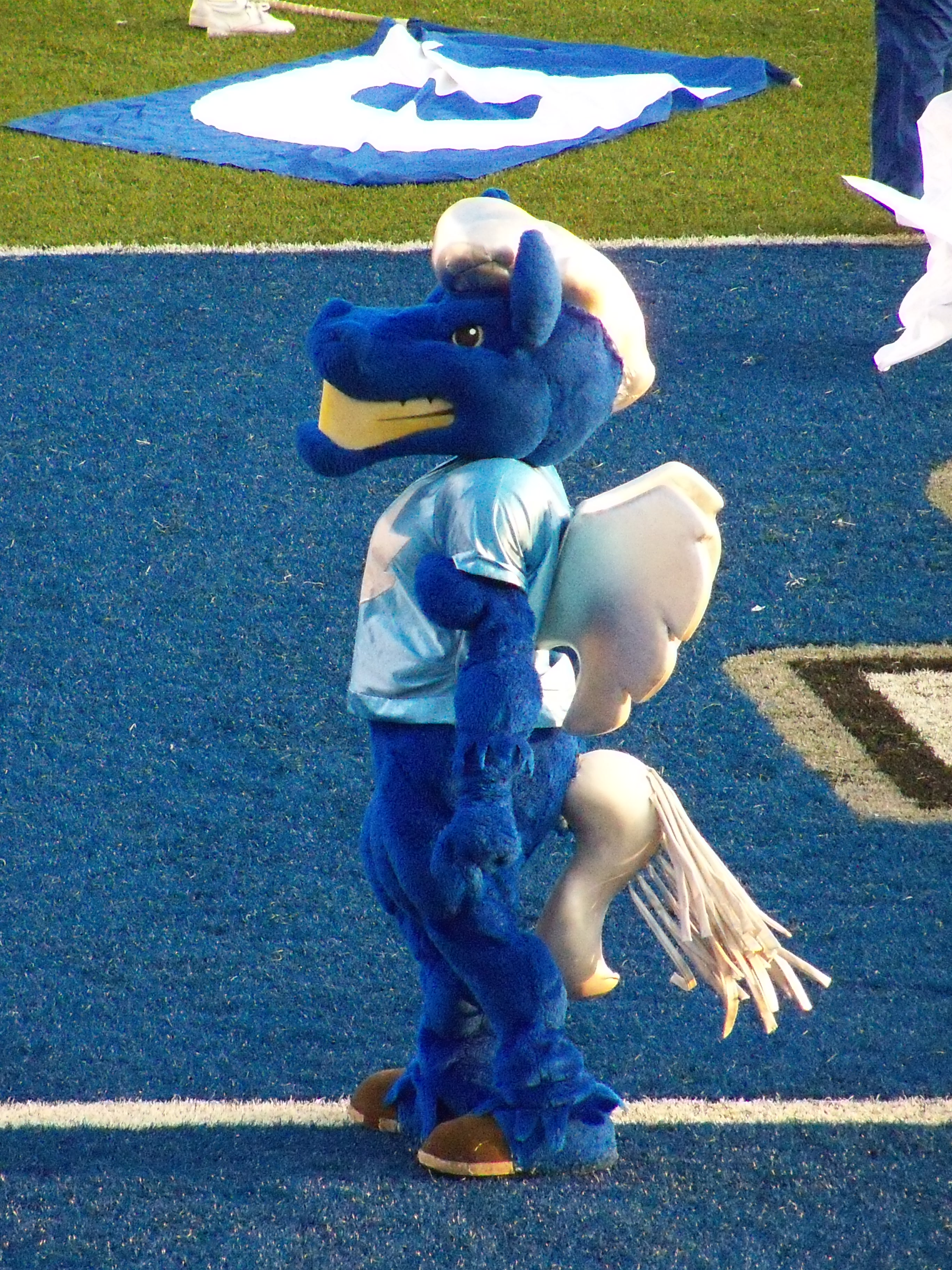
"Lightning", MTSU's mascot, prior to a football game

MTSU's original mascot was Nathan Bedford Forrest, a Confederate General and early leader in the Ku Klux Klan. Because of Forrest's ties to the Ku Klux Klan, the mascot was later changed to a blue-colored scent hound dog named "Ole Blue" in the 1970s.

MTSU's current mascot is a blue winged horse named "Lightning," adopted as the mascot in 1998, when the athletics department updated its image in preparation for the 1999 upgrade to Division I-A football and subsequent transfer to the Sun Belt Conference. "Lightning" symbolizes the university's aerospace and horse science programs and the region's heritage in the walking horse industry.

== Rivals ==
MTSU's main rival in all sports is against WKU (Western Kentucky Hilltoppers) in the aptly named "100 Miles of Hate". The Blue Raiders also have a growing rivalry with the University of Alabama-Birmingham. Historically, the Tennessee Tech Golden Eagles have been a rival in all sports, with the most notable meeting being in 1990; when a basketball game between the two schools turned into a bench clearing brawl.

== Media coverage ==
MTSU operates the "Blue Raider Sports Network", a radio network syndicating its sporting events to several stations across the area. Also, some of the football games are recorded onto video by students from the College of Mass Communications and are aired on the student run TV station, MTTV Channel 10. Occasionally, football games will be broadcast on ESPN Plus, and can either be seen locally or on ESPN's pay-per-view "Gameplan" service. The Blue Raiders can also be seen occasionally on ESPN2.

MTSU men's basketball games can be heard on 1450 AM WGNS, and 89.5 FM WMOT.

MTSU women's basketball, plus occasional baseball and softball games, can be heard on 88.3 FM WMTS-FM.

Cumulus Media's ESPN 106.7 The Fan WNFN in Nashville became the flagship station for MTSU football in August 2006. The football games also remain on WMOT.

MTSU also provides live audio and video broadcasts of women's soccer through their website www.GoBlueRaiders.com, with David Powell providing commentary since the 2006 season.

== See also ==
- List of college athletic programs in Tennessee
