= 1955 Murray State Thoroughbreds football team =

American college football season

1955 Murray State Thoroughbreds football
- Conference: Ohio Valley Conference
- Record: 6–4 (2–3 OVC)
- Head coach: Fred Faurot (8th season)
- Home stadium: Cutchin Stadium

1955 Ohio Valley Conference football standings
	Conf.					Overall
Team	W		L		T	W		L		T
Tennessee Tech $	5	–	0	–	0	7	–	3	–	0
Middle Tennessee	4	–	1	–	0	7	–	2	–	1
Eastern Kentucky	3	–	2	–	0	5	–	4	–	1
Murray State	2	–	3	–	0	6	–	4	–	0
Western Kentucky	1	–	4	–	0	3	–	6	–	0
Morehead State	0	–	5	–	0	0	–	9	–	0
$ – Conference champion

The 1955 Murray State Thoroughbreds football team was an American football team that represented Murray State College—now known as Murray State University—as a member of the Ohio Valley Conference (OVC) during the 1955 college football season. Led by Fred Faurot in his eighth and final season as head coach, the Thoroughbreds compiled an overall record of 6–4 with a mark of 2–3 in conference play, placing fourth in the OVC.

== Schedule ==
Date	Time	Opponent	Site	Result	Attendance	Source
September 17		Louisville*	Cutchin Stadium; Murray, KY	W 33–15		
September 24		at Tennessee Tech	Cookeville, TN	L 7–20	5,000	
October 1		Eastern Kentucky	Cutchin Stadium; Murray, KY	W 6–21		
October 8		Memphis State*	Cutchin Stadium; Murray, KY	L 7–20		
October 15		at Arkansas State*	Kays Field; Jonesboro, AR	L 13–7	5,000	
October 22	1:30 p.m.	Florence State*	Cutchin Stadium; Murray, KY	W 14–7	4,500	
October 29	2:00 p.m.	at Morehead State	Jayne Stadium; Morehead, KY	W 22–7		
November 5		Middle Tennessee^{†}	Cutchin Stadium; Murray, KY	L 28–33	5,000	
November 12	8:00 p.m.	at Austin Peay*	Municipal Stadium; Clarksville, TN	W 20–13		
November 19		at Western Kentucky	Bowling Green, KY (rivalry)	W 28–12	5,000	
*Non-conference game; ^{†}Homecoming; All times are in Central time
