= 1952 East Tennessee State Buccaneers football team =

American college football season

1952 East Tennessee State Buccaneers football

Burley Bowl champion

Burley Bowl, W 34–16 vs. Emory and Henry
- Conference: Volunteer State Athletic Conference
- Record: 6–1–2 (1–1–1 VSAC)
- Head coach: Star Wood (1st season)
- Captains: Hal Morrison; Cecil Maddux
- Home stadium: State College Stadium

The 1952 East Tennessee State Buccaneers football team was an American football team that represented East Tennessee State College (ETSC)—now known as East Tennessee State University—as a member of the Volunteer State Athletic Conference (VSAC) during the 1952 college football season. Led by first-year head coach Star Wood, the Buccaneers compiled an overall record of 6–1–2. East Tennessee State's made the program first bowl game appearance with victory in the Burley Bowl over Emory and Henry by the score of 34–16. The team captains were Hal Morrison and Cecil Maddux.

== Schedule ==
Date	Time	Opponent	Site	Result	Attendance	Source
September 20	9:00 p.m.	at Austin Peay	Municipal Stadium; Clarksville, TN	T 6–6	3,000	
September 27	8:00 p.m.	Morehead State*	State College Stadium; Johnson City, TN	W 34–0	4,000	
October 4	3:00 p.m.	at Western Carolina*	College Field; Cullowhee, NC	W 13–7	2,000	
October 11	8:00 p.m.	Maryville (TN)*^{†}	State College Stadium; Johnson City, TN	W 33–13	5,000	
October 18	9:00 p.m.	at Carson–Newman	Jefferson City, TN	W 14–7		
October 25		at Appalachian State*	College Field; Boone, NC	T 27–27		
November 8		at Tennessee Tech*	Overall Field; Cookeville, TN	W 21–13	4,000	
November 15	8:00 p.m.	Middle Tennessee	State College Stadium; Johnson City, TN	L 14–28	2,500	
November 27	2:15 p.m.	vs. Emory and Henry*	Roosevelt Memorial Stadium; Johnson City, TN (Burley Bowl)	W 34–16	10,000	
*Non-conference game; ^{†}Homecoming; All times are in Eastern time
