= Wilburn Tucker =

American sports coach (1920–1980)

Biographical details
- Born: August 10, 1920; Rutherford County, Tennessee, U.S.
- Died: October 6, 1980 (aged 60); Cookeville, Tennessee, U.S.

Playing career

Football
- 1940–1942: Tennessee Tech

Baseball
- c. 1940: Tennessee Tech

Coaching career (HC unless noted)

Football
- 1946–1951: Tennessee Tech (freshmen)
- 1952–1953: Tennessee Tech (backfield)
- 1954–1967: Tennessee Tech

Baseball
- 1948–1954: Tennessee Tech

Head coaching record
- Overall: 70–66–5 (football); 70–39 (baseball)
- Bowls: 0–1

Accomplishments and honors

Championships
- Football; 5 OVC (1955, 1958–1961)

Awards
- Ohio Valley Conference Hall of Fame (1987)

Wilburn Tucker (August 10, 1920 – October 6, 1980) was an American football and baseball player and coach. He was the head football coach at Tennessee Tech from 1954 to 1967, leading the team to five Ohio Valley Conference (OVC) championships. He was later inducted into both the Tennessee Tech and OVC Halls of Fame.

== Early years ==
Tucker attended Tennessee Polytechnic Institute, now known as Tennessee Technological University, in the early 1940s. He played both baseball and football before graduating in 1943. He then served in the United States Navy during World War II. After the war, Tucker received a master's degree from the University of Tennessee.

== Coaching career ==
Tucker returned to Tennessee Polytechnic as the freshman football coach, holding that position from 1946 to 1951. He next served as Tennessee Tech's backfield coach and scout during the 1952 and 1953 seasons. He also served as the school's baseball coach from 1948 to 1954. He compiled a 70–39 record as the school's baseball coach.

In January 1954, Tucker was promoted to head football coach at Tennessee Polytechnic. He held that position from 1954 to 1967, compiling a record of 70–66–5 as head coach and led the team to five Ohio Valley Conference championships: 1955, 1957, 1959, 1960, and 1961. In December 1967, he was fired after his 1967 team posted a 3–7 record.

== Later years and honors ==
After his coaching career, Tucker operated a sporting goods store in Cookeville, Tennessee.

Tucker was inducted into the Tennessee Tech Hall of Fame in 1977. He died in October 1980 at age 59 at Cookeville General Hospital.

Tucker was posthumously inducted into the Ohio Valley Conference Hall of Fame in 1987. Tucker Stadium at Tennessee Tech is named after him.

== Head coaching record ==
=== Football ===
Year	Team	Overall	Conference	Standing	Bowl/playoffs
Tennessee Tech Golden Eagles (Ohio Valley Conference) (1954–1967)
1954	Tennessee Tech	4–4–2	1–3–1	5th	
1955	Tennessee Tech	7–3	5–0	1st	
1956	Tennessee Tech	5–4–1	2–3	T–3rd	
1957	Tennessee Tech	6–4	4–1	2nd	
1958	Tennessee Tech	7–3	5–1	T–1st	
1959	Tennessee Tech	6–2–2	5–0–1	T–1st	
1960	Tennessee Tech	8–3	6–0	1st	L Tangerine
1961	Tennessee Tech	7–3	6–0	1st	
1962	Tennessee Tech	2–8	1–5	T–6th	
1963	Tennessee Tech	6–4	3–4	T–4th	
1964	Tennessee Tech	1–9	1–6	8th	
1965	Tennessee Tech	3–7	3–4	T–4th	
1966	Tennessee Tech	5–5	4–3	T–3rd	
1967	Tennessee Tech	3–7	3–4	T–4th	
Tennessee Tech:		70–66–5	49–34–2		
Total:		70–66–5			
National championship Conference title Conference division title or championship game berth
