= 1964 Grantland Rice Bowl =

- 1964 Program cover
Muskingum Fighting Muskies	Middle Tennessee Blue Raiders
(8–1)	(7–2–1)
Ohio Athletic Conference	Ohio Athletic Conference
0	20
Head coach: Ed Sherman	Head coach: Charles Murphy
	1	2	3	4	Total
Muskingum	0	0	0	0	0
Middle Tennessee	7	0	0	13	20
- Date: December 12, 1964
- Season: 1964
- Stadium: Horace Jones Field
- Location: Murfreesboro, Tennessee
- Attendance: 4,000

The 1964 Grantland Rice Bowl was an NCAA College Division game following the 1964 season, between the Muskingum Fighting Muskies and the Middle Tennessee Blue Raiders. This was the inaugural playing of the bowl.

== Notable participants ==
Middle Tennessee defensive back Boots Donnelly would later serve as head coach for Austin Peay and Middle Tennessee; he was inducted to the College Football Hall of Fame in 2013. Muskingum head coach Ed Sherman was inducted to the College Football Hall of Fame in 1996. Inductees of the Sports Hall of Fame at Middle Tennessee include Boots Donnelly, defensive lineman Keith Atchley, quarterback Teddy Morris, and head coach Charles "Bubber" Murphy.

== Scoring summary ==
Scoring summary

Quarter	Time	Drive			Team	Scoring information	Score	
Quarter	Time	Plays	Yards	TOP	Team	Scoring information	MC	MTSC
1		12	56		MTSC	David Petty 1-yard touchdown run, Duane Brown kick good	0	7
4		6	68		MTSC	Teddy Morris 5-yard touchdown run, Duane Brown kick good	0	14
4	0:44				MTSC	Fumble recovery returned 99 yards for touchdown by Ray Neal, 2-point run failed	0	20
"TOP" = time of possession. For other American football terms, see Glossary of American football.							0	20
