= 1955 East Tennessee State Buccaneers football team =

American college football season

1955 East Tennessee State Buccaneers football

Burley Bowl champion

Burley Bowl, W 7–0 vs. Appalachian State
- Conference: Volunteer State Athletic Conference
- Record: 6–3–1 (– VSAC)
- Head coach: Star Wood (3rd season)
- Home stadium: College Stadium

The 1955 East Tennessee State Buccaneers football team was an American football team that represented East Tennessee State College (ETSC), now known as East Tennessee State University, as a member of the Volunteer State Athletic Conference (VSAC) during the 1955 college football season. Led by third-year head coach Star Wood, the Buccaneers compiled an overall record of 6–3–1. East Tennessee State defeated Appalachian State in the Burley Bowl by the score of 7–0.

== Schedule ==
Date	Opponent	Site	Result	Attendance	Source
September 17	Austin Peay	College Stadium; Johnson City, TN	W 6–0	3,600	
September 24	at Western Kentucky*	Bowling Green, KY	L 7–20		
October 1	Western Carolina*	College Stadium; Johnson City, TN	T 7–7		
October 8	at Maryville (TN)	Honaker Field; Maryville, TN	W 28–18		
October 15	Carson–Newman^{†}	College Stadium; Johnson City, TN	W 22–7	5,000	
October 22	East Carolina*	College Stadium; Johnson City, TN	W 34–20	3,000	
October 29	Tennessee Tech*	College Stadium; Johnson City, TN	W 14–6	3,000	
November 12	at Middle Tennessee*	Horace Jones Field; Murfreesboro, TN	L 7–20		
November 19	at Florence State*	Municipal Stadium; Florence, AL	L 12–13		
November 24	vs. Appalachian State*	Memorial Stadium; Johnson City, TN (Burley Bowl)	W 7–0		
*Non-conference game; ^{†}Homecoming; Source:
