= 1953 Tangerine Bowl =

American college football game

East Texas State Lions	Tennessee Tech Golden Eagles
(10–0)	(9–1)
Lone Star Conference	Ohio Valley Conference
33	0
Head coach: Milburn Smith	Head coach: Preston Vaughn Overall
	1	2	3	4	Total
East Texas State	13	0	0	20	33
Tennessee Tech	0	0	0	0	0
- Date: January 1, 1953
- Season: 1952
- Stadium: Tangerine Bowl
- Location: Orlando, Florida
- MVP: Marvin Brown, East Texas State
- Attendance: 12,340

The 1953 Tangerine Bowl was an American college football bowl game played following the 1952 season, on January 1, 1953, at the Tangerine Bowl stadium in Orlando, Florida. The game featured the Tennessee Tech Golden Eagles and the East Texas State Lions (now East Texas A&M University).

== Background ==
The Lions were champions of the Lone Star Conference after finishing their regular season 10–0, and they entered the bowl with an 18-game winning streak. They were coached by "Catfish" Smith, in his second year leading the team. The Golden Eagles finished their regular season 9–1, under head coach "Putty" Overall, who had come out of retirement after previously coaching the team from 1923 to 1946.

== Game summary ==
East Texas State scored two touchdowns in the first quarter, jumping out to a 13–0 lead. Tennessee Tech prevented them from scoring during the next two quarters, but were unable to score themselves, and the game entered the fourth quarter still at 13–0. During the final quarter, East Texas State scored three more touchdowns to stretch their lead to 33–0, the game's final score. Halfback Marvin Brown, who had scored two of East Texas State's five touchdowns, was named the game's most valuable player.

== Aftermath ==
East Texas State would make three more appearances in this bowl during the 1950s, including the next playing, the 1954 Tangerine Bowl. Tennessee Tech's next postseason appearance would come eight seasons later, in this bowl game, the December 1960 Tangerine Bowl.
