= Hooper Eblen =

American football and basketball coach (1911–1976)

Biographical details
- Born: November 16, 1911
- Died: June 30, 1976 (aged 64); Knoxville, Tennessee, U.S.

Playing career

Football
- 1933–1934: Tennessee Wesleyan
- 1934-1936: Tennessee

Basketball
- 1934–1936: Tennessee Wesleyan
- Positions: Fullback (football); Forward (basketball)

Coaching career (HC unless noted)

Football
- 1936: Whitwell HS (TN)
- 1937–1938: Carter HS (TN)
- 1939–1940: Tennessee Wesleyan
- 1941: Tennessee Tech (backfield)
- 1946: Tennessee Tech (backfield)
- 1947–1949: Tennessee Tech

Basketball
- 1937–1938: Carter HS (TN)
- 1939–1941: Tennessee Wesleyan
- 1947–1948: Tennessee Tech

Administrative career (AD unless noted)
- 1962–1974: Tennessee Tech

Head coaching record
- Overall: 12–19 (college football); 18–7 (college basketball)

Robert "Hooper" Eblen (November 16, 1911 – June 30, 1976) was an American football and basketball coach. He served as the head football coach at Tennessee Tech from 1947 to 1949, compiling a record of 12–19. Eblen was school's head basketball coach during the 1947–48 season, tallying a mark of 18–7.

A native of Kingston, Tennessee, Eblen attended Tennessee Wesleyan College—now known as Tennessee Wesleyan University—in Athens, Tennessee when it operated as a junior college. There he played football as a fullback and basketball as a forward. He moved on to the University of Tennessee, lettering for the Tennessee Volunteers football team in 1935 before graduating in 1936.

Eblen began his coaching career at Whitwell H. S. (TN) in 1936 the departed in 1937 for a start up football program at Carter High School in Strawberry Plains, Tennessee. After serving as head football and head basketball coach there, he returned to Tennessee Wesleyan when he was hired in December 1938 as a head football coach to succeed Rube McCray. Eblen also coached basketball at Tennessee Wesleyan, leading teams in both sports to Southeastern junior college championships. In 1941, he moved to Tennessee Tech to work as backfield coach under head football coach Preston Vaughn Overall. Eblen left Tennessee Tech in 1942 for the University of Michigan, where he earned a master's degree in physical education. After serving in the United States Navy during World War II, he resumed his post as Tennessee Tech. In January 1947, Eblen was appointed to succeed Overall as head coach of the Tennessee Tech Golden Eagles football team.

Eblen died on June 30, 1976, after suffering a heart attack at Baptist Hospital in Knoxville, Tennessee.

== Head coaching record ==
=== College football ===
Year	Team	Overall	Conference	Standing	Bowl/playoffs
Tennessee Tech Golden Eagles (Independent) (1947–1948)
1947	Tennessee Tech	4–7			
1948	Tennessee Tech	5–6			
Tennessee Tech Golden Eagles (Ohio Valley Conference) (1949)
1949	Tennessee Tech	3–6	0–3	8th	
Tennessee Tech:		12–19	0–3		
Total:		12–19			
