= 1955 Appalachian State Mountaineers football team =

American college football season

1955 Appalachian State Mountaineers football

Burley Bowl, L 0–7 vs. East Tennessee State
- Conference: North State Conference
- Record: 6–5 (3–3 NSC)
- Head coach: E. C. Duggins (8th season)
- Home stadium: College Field

1955 North State Conference football standings
	Conf.					Overall
Team	W		L		T	W		L		T
Lenoir Rhyne $	6	–	0	–	0	10	–	0	–	0
Catawba *	4	–	2	–	0	6	–	4	–	0
East Carolina	3	–	2	–	0	4	–	5	–	0
Appalachian State	3	–	3	–	0	3	–	6	–	0
Elon	2	–	4	–	0	3	–	7	–	0
Western Carolina *	1	–	4	–	0	1	–	8	–	1
Guilford	0	–	4	–	0	0	–	7	–	1
$ – Conference champion; * – Western Carolina forfeited a win over Catawba.

The 1955 Appalachian State Mountaineers football team was an American football team that represented Appalachian State Teachers College (now known as Appalachian State University) as a member of the North State Conference during the 1955 college football season. In their eighth year under head coach E. C. Duggins, the Mountaineers compiled an overall record of 6–5, with a mark of 3–3 in conference play, and finished fourth in the NSC. State concluded their season with a loss against East Tennessee State at the Burley Bowl.

== Schedule ==
Date	Opponent	Site	Result	Attendance	Source
September 10	Apprentice*	College Field; Boone, NC	W 46–7		
September 24	Western Carolina	College Field; Boone, NC (rivalry)	L 6–7	3,500	
October 1	at Elon	Burlington Municipal Stadium; Burlington, NC	W 19–0	6,500	
October 8	Lenoir Rhyne	College Field; Boone, NC	L 13–26		
October 15	at Catawba	Shuford Stadium; Salisbury, NC	W 21–19		
October 22	Emory & Henry*^{†}	College Field; Boone, NC	W 26–0	5,000	
October 29	at East Carolina	College Stadium; Greenville, NC	L 0–13		
November 5	at Guilford	Greensboro, NC	W 27–6		
November 12	at Presbyterian*	Bailey Stadium; Clinton, SC	W 35–6		
November 19	at Tampa*	Phillips Field; Tampa, FL	L 0–38	8,500	
November 24	vs. East Tennessee State*	Memorial Stadium; Johnson City, TN (Burley Bowl)	L 0–7		
*Non-conference game; ^{†}Homecoming
