= Preston Vaughn Overall =

American football and basketball coach (1897–1974)

Biographical details
- Born: June 5, 1897; Murfreesboro, Tennessee, U.S.
- Died: January 1, 1974 (aged 76); Nashville, Tennessee, U.S.

Playing career

Football
- 1917: Middle Tennessee State Normal
- 1921: Vanderbilt
- Positions: Guard, tackle

Coaching career (HC unless noted)

Football
- 1923–1946: Tennessee Poly/Tech
- 1952–1953: Tennessee Tech

Basketball
- 1924–1947: Tennessee Poly/Tech

Head coaching record
- Overall: 97–96–18 (football); 170–151–1 (basketball)
- Bowls: 0–1

Accomplishments and honors

Championships
- Football; 2 OVC (1952–1953)

Preston Vaughn "Putty" Overall (June 5, 1897 – January 1, 1974) was an American football player and coach of football, basketball, and baseball. He served as the head coach of football, baseball, and basketball at Tennessee Polytechnic Institute, now known as Tennessee Tech. He came out of retirement in 1952 and coached Tech's football team, posting a 9–1 regular season record plus an invitation to the 1953 Tangerine Bowl. Overall played football at Middle Tennessee State, where he was captain of the 1917 team, as well as one year with Dan McGugin's Vanderbilt Commodores, in 1921. The First Fifty Years: A History of Middle Tennessee State College tells us "During his Murfreesboro days, "Putty Overall" was a hulking giant of two hundred and seventy-five pounds who required custom-made uniforms." He was honored in 1961 as a distinguished alumnus of Middle Tennessee State University. In 1966, he was inducted into the Tennessee Sports Hall of Fame.

Overall died on January 1, 1974, at a hospital in Nashville, Tennessee.

== Head coaching record ==
=== Football ===
| Year | Team | Overall | Conference | Standing | Bowl/playoffs |
|---|---|---|---|---|---|
Tennessee Poly Golden Eagles (Independent) (1923–1930)
| 1923 | Tennessee Poly | 2–3–1 | | | |
| 1924 | Tennessee Poly | 5–3–1 | | | |
| 1925 | Tennessee Poly | 3–2–1 | | | |
| 1926 | Tennessee Poly | 1–4–1 | | | |
| 1927 | Tennessee Poly | 2–5–1 | | | |
| 1928 | Tennessee Poly | 6–0–1 | | | |
| 1929 | Tennessee Poly | 3–3–1 | | | |
| 1930 | Tennessee Poly | 6–2–1 | | | |
Tennessee Poly Golden Eagles (Mississippi Valley Conference) (1931–1932)
| 1931 | Tennessee Poly | 6–3 | | | |
| 1932 | Tennessee Poly | 4–0–3 | 2–0–1 | 2nd | |
Tennessee Tech Golden Eagles (Southern Intercollegiate Athletic Association) (1933–1941)
| 1933 | Tennessee Tech | 4–4 | 2–2 | T–14th | |
| 1934 | Tennessee Tech | 3–5–1 | 1–4 | T–26th | |
| 1935 | Tennessee Tech | 1–6–1 | 0–5–1 | T–32nd | |
| 1936 | Tennessee Tech | 2–5–1 | 1–5 | T–24th | |
| 1937 | Tennessee Tech | 3–5–1 | 1–5–1 | T–27th | |
| 1938 | Tennessee Tech | 6–3 | 4–1 | T–8th | |
| 1939 | Tennessee Tech | 6–3–1 | 4–0 | 2nd | |
| 1940 | Tennessee Tech | 2–6 | 1–2 | T–19th | |
| 1941 | Tennessee Tech | 5–4 | 3–1 | T–6th | |
Tennessee Tech Golden Eagles (Independent) (1942–1946)
| 1942 | Tennessee Tech | 3–4–2 | | | |
| 1943 | Tennessee Tech | 1–5 | | | |
| 1944 | Tennessee Tech | 1–2 | | | |
| 1945 | Tennessee Tech | 1–8 | | | |
| 1946 | Tennessee Tech | 5–5 | | | |
Tennessee Tech Golden Eagles (Ohio Valley Conference) (1952–1953)
| 1952 | Tennessee Tech | 9–2 | 4–1 | T–1st | L Tangerine |
| 1953 | Tennessee Tech | 7–4 | 5–0 | 1st | |
| Tennessee Poly/Tech: | | 97–96–18 | | | |
| Total: | | 97–96–18 | | | |
National championship Conference title Conference division title or championship game berth
