= Burley Bowl =

The Burley Bowl was a postseason college football bowl game played from 1945 through 1956. It was held each year on Thanksgiving Day in Johnson City, Tennessee, at the city's Memorial Stadium, which was demolished in July 2010. The game was part of an annual two-day tobacco festival, with the name of the bowl coming from Burley tobacco. Like some other postseason match-ups of the era, such as the Grape Bowl, Glass Bowl, and Optimist Bowl, results are listed in NCAA records, but the games were not considered NCAA-sanctioned bowls.

The inaugural game was held on November 29, 1945. That day was the last (and fifth) Thursday of November, which was observed as Thanksgiving in Tennessee that year, despite President Truman proclaiming the holiday to be the fourth Thursday of the month.

== Game results ==
Program cover for 1947 game

Season	Date	Winner		Loser		Attendance	References
1945	November 29, 1945	High Point 7, Milligan 7				3,500	
1946	November 28, 1946	Southeastern Louisiana	21	Milligan	13	7,500	
1947	November 27, 1947	West Chester	20	Carson–Newman	6	10,000	
1948	November 25, 1948	West Chester	7	Appalachian State	2	12,000	
1949	November 24, 1949	Emory and Henry	32	Hanover	0	12,000	
1950	November 23, 1950	Emory and Henry	26	Appalachian State	6	12,000	
1951	November 22, 1951	Morris Harvey	27	Lebanon Valley	20	9,000	
1952	November 27, 1952	East Tennessee State	34	Emory and Henry	16	10,000	
1953	November 26, 1953	East Tennessee State	48	Emory and Henry	12		
1954	November 25, 1954	Appalachian State	28	East Tennessee State	13		
1955	November 24, 1955	East Tennessee State	7	Appalachian State	0		
1956	November 22, 1956	Memphis State	32	East Tennessee State	12	1,200	

=== Game records ===
Team scoring records	Performance	Year
Most points scored (one team)	48, East Tennessee State	1953
Most points scored (both teams)	60, East Tennessee State vs. Emory and Henry	1953
Most points scored (losing team)	20, Lebanon Valley	1951
Fewest points scored (winning team)	7, West Chester; 7, East Tennessee State	1948; 1955
Fewest points scored (both teams)	7, East Tennessee State vs. Appalachian State	1955
Fewest points allowed	0, Emory and Henry; 0, East Tennessee State	1949; 1955
Largest margin of victory	36, East Tennessee State	1953

== Most appearances ==
Only teams with more than one appearance are listed.

Rank	Team	Appearances	Record
1	East Tennessee State	5	3–2
T2	Emory & Henry	4	2–2
T2	Appalachian State	4	1–3
T4	West Chester	2	2–0
T4	Milligan	2	0–1–1

== Notes ==
- NCAA records list the date of the first Burley Bowl as "1-1-1946", which is inconsistent with contemporary newspaper reports.

== See also ==
- List of college bowl games
- National Register of Historic Places listings in Washington County, Tennessee (Memorial Stadium)
