= 1955 Tennessee Tech Golden Eagles football team =

American college football season

1955 Tennessee Tech Golden Eagles football

OVC champion
- Conference: Ohio Valley Conference
- Record: 7–3 (5–0 OVC)
- Head coach: Wilburn Tucker (2nd season)
- Captains: Dean Kirk; Joe Mac Reeves
- Home stadium: Overall Field

1955 Ohio Valley Conference football standings
	Conf.					Overall
Team	W		L		T	W		L		T
Tennessee Tech $	5	–	0	–	0	7	–	3	–	0
Middle Tennessee	4	–	1	–	0	7	–	2	–	1
Eastern Kentucky	3	–	2	–	0	5	–	4	–	1
Murray State	2	–	3	–	0	6	–	4	–	0
Western Kentucky	1	–	4	–	0	3	–	6	–	0
Morehead State	0	–	5	–	0	0	–	9	–	0
$ – Conference champion

The 1955 Tennessee Tech Golden Eagles football team represented Tennessee Polytechnic Institute (TPI)—now known as Tennessee Tech–as a member of the Ohio Valley Conference (OVC) during the 1955 college football season. Led by second-year head coach Wilburn Tucker, the Golden Eagles compiled an overall record of 7–3 with a mark of 5–0 in conference play, winning the OVC title. The team's co-captains were Dean Kirk and Joe Mac Reeves.

== Schedule ==
Date	Time	Opponent	Site	Result	Attendance	Source
September 17		Florence State*	Overall Field; Cookeville, TN	W 26–7	6,000	
September 24		Murray State	Overall Field; Cookeville, TN	W 20–7	5,000	
October 1		at Morehead State	Morehead, KY	W 55–0		
October 8		Eastern Kentucky^{†}	Overall Field; Cookeville, TN	W 13–7	9,000	
October 15		at Memphis State*	Crump Stadium; Memphis, TN	L 12–20		
October 22		at Western Kentucky	Bowling Green, KY	W 19–7		
October 29	7:00 p.m.	at East Tennessee State*	Johnson City, TN	L 6–14	3,000	
November 5		Austin Peay*	Overall Field; Cookeville, TN	W 37–7		
November 12		Arkansas State*	Overall Field; Cookeville, TN	L 20–27		
November 24		at Middle Tennessee	Horace Jones Field; Murfreesboro, TN	W 55–14	10,000	
*Non-conference game; ^{†}Homecoming; All times are in Central time
