= Band of Blue =

Marching band of Middle Tennessee State University

The MTSU Band of Blue
- School: Middle Tennessee State University
- Location: Murfreesboro, Tennessee, United States
- Conference: Conference USA
- Founded: 1957
- Director: Craig Cornish, Dennis Hawkins Jr.
- Members: 320

The Band of Blue, also known as the MTSU Marching Band of Blue, is an organization on the campus of Middle Tennessee State University that puts on regular half-time shows during Middle Tennessee Blue Raiders football games, as well as performances in the community and several marching band exhibitions. The band is open to all students on campus who enroll in the associated class and can demonstrate proficiency on a wind or percussion instrument and is versed in marching techniques. The band has been increasing in membership in recent years, with the band reaching its largest membership in the 2011 season. It is the largest student organization on the campus of Middle Tennessee State University and is composed of students from nearly every area of the university.
