= 1952 Tennessee Tech Golden Eagles football team =

American college football season

1952 Tennessee Tech Golden Eagles football

OVC co-champion

Tangerine Bowl, L 0–33 vs. East Texas State
- Conference: Ohio Valley Conference
- Record: 9–2 (4–1 OVC)
- Head coach: Preston Vaughn Overall (25th season)
- Captain: Tom Fann
- Alternate captain: Ken Broyles
- Home stadium: Overall Field

1952 Ohio Valley Conference football standings
	Conf.					Overall
Team	W		L		T	W		L		T
Western Kentucky +	4	–	1	–	0	9	–	1	–	0
Tennessee Tech +	4	–	1	–	0	9	–	2	–	0
Murray State	3	–	2	–	0	4	–	4	–	0
Middle Tennessee	2	–	2	–	0	6	–	5	–	0
Eastern Kentucky	0	–	3	–	1	3	–	4	–	1
Morehead State	0	–	4	–	1	1	–	6	–	1
$ – Conference champion

The 1952 Tennessee Tech Golden Eagles football team represented Tennessee Polytechnic Institute (TPI)—now known as Tennessee Tech–as a member of the Ohio Valley Conference (OVC) during the 1952 college football season. Led by 25th-year head coach Preston Vaughn Overall, the Golden Eagles compiled an overall record of 9–1 with a mark of 4–1 in conference play, sharing the OVC title with Western Kentucky. Tennessee Tech was invited to the Tangerine Bowl, where they lost to East Texas State. The team's captain was Tom Fann and the alternative captain was Ken Broyles.

== Schedule ==
Date	Time	Opponent	Site	Result	Attendance	Source
September 13		503rd Airborne / Fort Campbell*	Overall Field; Cookeville, TN	W 27–0		
September 27	8:00 p.m.	at Murray State	Cutchin Stadium; Murray, KY	W 14–13		
October 4		Morehead State	Overall Field; Cookeville, TN	W 30–6		
October 11		Eastern Kentucky	Overall Field; Cookeville, TN	W 28–14		
October 18		at Arkansas State*	Jonesboro, AR	W 21–13		
October 25	8:00 p.m.	Western Kentucky	Overall Field; Cookeville, TN	W 21–13	6,000	
November 1		at Marshall*	Fairfield Stadium; Huntington, WV	W 28–7		
November 8		East Tennessee State*	Overall Field; Cookeville, TN	W 21–13	4,000	
November 15		Memphis State*	Overall Field; Cookeville, TN	W 35–0		
November 27	2:00 p.m.	Middle Tennessee^{†}	Overall Field; Cookeville, TN	L 7–19	8,500	
January 1		vs. East Texas State*	Tangerine Bowl; Orlando, FL (Tangerine Bowl)	L 0–33	12,340	
*Non-conference game; ^{†}Homecoming; All times are in Central time
