= 1959 Middle Tennessee Blue Raiders football team =

American college football season

1959 Middle Tennessee Blue Raiders football

OVC co-champion Tangerine Bowl champion

Tangerine Bowl, W 21–12 vs. Presbyterian
- Conference: Ohio Valley Conference

Ranking
- Coaches: No. 3
- Record: 10–0–1 (5–0–1 OVC)
- Head coach: Charles M. Murphy (13th season)
- Captains: B. Pitts; Brady Luckett
- Home stadium: Horace Jones Field

1959 Ohio Valley Conference football standings
	Conf.					Overall
Team	W		L		T	W		L		T
No. 3 Middle Tennessee +	5	–	0	–	1	10	–	0	–	1
Tennessee Tech +	5	–	0	–	1	7	–	2	–	2
East Tennessee State	4	–	2	–	0	6	–	3	–	0
Western Kentucky	3	–	3	–	0	5	–	4	–	0
Eastern Kentucky	2	–	4	–	0	3	–	6	–	0
Morehead State	1	–	5	–	0	3	–	6	–	0
Murray State	0	–	6	–	0	0	–	10	–	0
+ – Conference co-champions; Rankings from UPI small college poll

The 1959 Middle Tennessee Blue Raiders football team represented the Middle Tennessee State College—now known as Middle Tennessee State University—as a member of the Ohio Valley Conference (OVC) during the 1959 college football season. Led by 13th-year head coach Charles M. Murphy, the Blue Raiders compiled an overall record of 10–0–1 with a mark of 5–0–1 in conference play, sharing the OVC title with Tennessee Tech. Middle Tennessee was invited to the Tangerine Bowl, where they beat Presbyterian. The team's captains were B. Pitts and Brady Luckett.

== Schedule ==
Date	Opponent	Rank	Site	Result	Attendance	Source
September 19	at Austin Peay*		Clarksville Municipal Stadium; Clarksville, TN	W 36–0		
September 26	Jacksonville State*	No. 10	Horace Jones Field; Murfreesboro, TN	W 21–20		
October 3	Western Kentucky	No. 12	Horace Jones Field; Murfreesboro, TN (rivalry)	W 37–2		
October 10	at Eastern Kentucky	No. 8	Richmond, KY	W 14–6		
October 17	No. 9 Chattanooga*	No. 6	Horace Jones Field; Murfreesboro, TN	W 28–0		
October 24	at Morehead State	No. 5	Morehead, KY	W 27–0		
October 31	at Florence State*	No. 5	Florence, AL	W 34–26		
November 7	at Murray State	No. 5	Cutchin Stadium; Murray, KY	W 55–0		
November 14	East Tennessee State	No. 4	Horace Jones Field; Murfreesboro, TN	W 30–6		
November 26	Tennessee Tech	No. 3	Horace Jones Field; Murfreesboro, TN	T 21–21		
January 1, 1960	vs. No. 18 Presbyterian*	No. 3	Tangerine Bowl; Orlando, FL (Tangerine Bowl)	W 21–12	12,500	
*Non-conference game; Rankings from UPI Poll released prior to the game
