= 1960 Tangerine Bowl (January) =

American college football game

Middle Tennessee Blue Raiders	Presbyterian Blue Hose
(9–0–1)	(9–1)
Ohio Valley Conference	South Carolina Little Three
21	12
Head coach: Charles M. Murphy	Head coach: Frank Jones
	1	2	3	4	Total
Middle Tennessee	7	7	0	7	21
Presbyterian	0	6	6	0	12
- Date: January 1, 1960
- Season: 1959
- Stadium: Tangerine Bowl
- Location: Orlando, Florida
- MVP: Bob Waters, Presbyterian
- Attendance: 12,500

The 1960 Tangerine Bowl (January) was an American college football bowl game played on January 1, 1960, at the Tangerine Bowl stadium in Orlando, Florida. The Middle Tennessee Blue Raiders defeated the Presbyterian Blue Hose by a score of 21–12. It was the first of two Tangerine Bowls played in calendar year 1960.

== Statistics ==
Statistics	Middle Tennessee	Presbyterian
First downs	10	15
Rushing yards	240	129
Passing yards	0	197
Yards penalized	47	40
Punts–average	1–34.4	8–30.0
Fumbles lost	0	1

== Scoring summary ==
Scoring summary

Quarter	Time	Drive			Team	Scoring information	Score	
Quarter	Time	Plays	Yards	TOP	Team	Scoring information	MTSC	PC
1					MTSC	Bucky Pitts 53-yard punt return, kick good	7	0
2					MTSC	Ray Purvis 5-yard touchdown run, kick good	14	0
2					PC	Bobby Pate 11-yard touchdown reception from Bob Waters, kick no good	14	6
3					PC	Bobby Pate 43-yard touchdown reception from Bob Waters, 2-point attempt failed	14	12
4					MTSC	Bucky Pitts 20-yard touchdown run, kick good	21	12
"TOP" = time of possession. For other American football terms, see Glossary of American football.							21	12
