= Middle Tennessee Blue Raiders football =

Football team of Middle Tennessee State University

2026 Middle Tennessee Blue Raiders football team
- First season: 1911; 115 years ago
- Athletic director: Chris Massaro
- Head coach: Derek Mason; 2nd season, 6–18 (.250)
- Location: Murfreesboro, Tennessee
- Stadium: Johnny "Red" Floyd Stadium (capacity: 27,303)
- NCAA division: Division I FBS
- Conference: Conference USA
- Colors: Royal blue and white
- All-time record: 613–481–28 (.559)
- Bowl record: 6–8 (.429)

Conference championships
- OVC: 1956, 1957, 1958, 1959, 1962, 1964, 1965, 1985, 1989, 1990, 1992 SBC: 2001, 2006

Division championships
- C-USA East: 2018
- Rivalries: Troy (rivalry); Western Kentucky (rivalry)
- Fight song: MTSU Fight Song
- Mascot: Lightning
- Marching band: Band of Blue
- Website: goblueraiders.com

The Middle Tennessee Blue Raiders football is the intercollegiate football program representing Middle Tennessee State University in Murfreesboro, Tennessee. The Blue Raiders compete in the Football Bowl Subdivision (FBS) of the National Collegiate Athletic Association (NCAA) and are a member of Conference USA. They are coached by Derek Mason, who was hired as the 15th head coach in program history on December 6, 2023.

Middle Tennessee has appeared in 14 bowl games and seven I-AA playoffs. The Blue Raiders play their home games at the Johnny "Red" Floyd Stadium, which has a seating capacity of 27,303.

== History ==
=== Early history (1911–1946) ===
Middle Tennessee State University first fielded a football team in 1911 under the direction of head coach L. T. "Mutt" Weber. They won their first game in 1912. From 1913 to 1923, Alfred B. Miles led the Blue Raiders football program. The 1914 football season led by Miles was its first undefeated season, with five straight victories after a tie with Cumberland.

Frank Faulkinberry was hired as MTSU's head coach after Miles' departure. During his tenure, the Blue Raiders compiled a record of 33–26–4. Faulkinberry was found shot to death in his garage on May 13, 1933, a suspected suicide being the cause.

E. M. Waller led the Blue Raiders for two seasons and compiled a 3–14–1 record. Waller resigned due to the team's struggles after two seasons.

Johnny Floyd started coaching MTSU in 1935 and led the Blue Raiders for four seasons. Under his tutelage, the Blue Raiders compiled a record of 30–8–1. Floyd's 1935 team went a perfect 8–0. However, a 2–6 campaign in 1938 ended his time in Murfreesboro.

Ernest Alley was named the next head coach of MTSU football, and in his one-season, the Blue Raiders compiled a 1–6–1 record.

Elwin W. Midgett led the Blue Raiders for four seasons (MTSU did not field a football team from 1943 to 1945 because of World War II. In 1940, Midgett led the Blue Raiders to a 4–4 mark. In 1941, the Blue Raiders posted a 4–3–1 campaign, followed by 4–2–1 in 1942, and 6–2–1 in 1946.

=== Charles Murphy era (1947–1968) ===
Charles Murphy is the longest-tenured and winningest head coach in MTSU, football history, with a 155–63–8 record in 22 seasons as MTSU's head coach. Under Murphy's tutelage, the Blue Raiders posted four undefeated seasons (1949, 1957, 1959 and 1965) along with 17 winning seasons and four bowl appearances. Murphy was asked to resign at MTSU after a 2–8 campaign in 1968.

=== Donald Fuoss era (1969) ===
Succeeding Murphy as the Blue Raiders head coach was Donald Fuoss, who only lasted for one season, a 1–9 campaign in 1969 that resulted in his firing.

=== Bill Peck era (1970–1974) ===
Bill Peck took over as head coach in 1970 and instantly brought improvement to Murfreesboro. In his first season, the Blue Raiders posted a 6–3–1 record. In 1971, MTSU posted a record of 7–4. That was followed by a 7–3–1 mark in 1972, a 4–7 mark in 1973 and a 3–8 campaign in 1974. Peck was asked to resign after back to back losing seasons to end his tenure.

=== Ben Hurt era (1975–1978) ===
Ben Hurt took over the Blue Raiders in 1975. Under his tutelage, in 1975, MTSU posted a 4–7 mark. That was followed by another 4–7 campaign in 1976. In 1977, Hurt's Blue Raiders posted a 3–8 record that was followed by a 1–9–1 1978 season, after which Hurt was fired.

=== Boots Donnelly era (1979–1998) ===
Austin Peay head coach James "Boots" Donnelly was hired as MTSU's head coach in 1979. Under his leadership, the MTSU football program compiled a record of 133–80–1. Donnelly is the second winningest football coach in MTSU history. Of his 20 seasons at the helm, 15 of them were winning seasons (including 12 in a row) and four of them were seasons of at least 10 wins. Donnelly resigned after a 5–5 season in 1998.

=== Andy McCollum era (1999–2005) ===
Baylor assistant coach Andy McCollum took over for Donnelly in 1999. McCollum led the Blue Raiders to a 6–5 record in 2000, their first as an FBS program. In 2001, McCollum oversaw an offense that ranked fifth nationally and MTSU finished 8–3 as the runner-up behind North Texas which won the Sun Belt Conference championship. In 2005, MTSU's defense ranked ninth nationally. McCollum was fired after the 2005 season.

=== Rick Stockstill era (2006–2023) ===
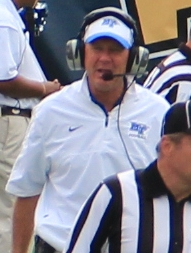
Coach Stockstill

In 2006, South Carolina tight ends coach and recruiting coordinator Rick Stockstill got the head coaching job at Middle Tennessee State. In his first season, Stockstill led the Blue Raiders to the program's second bowl game as well as a share of the Sun Belt Conference title. He was later that year named the conference coach of the year.

The 2007 and 2008 seasons saw the Blue Raiders take a small step back with back-to-back 5–7 seasons. However, in 2009, Stockstill and the Blue Raiders went 10–3 and won the New Orleans Bowl, which was the third bowl victory in school history. Again, Stockstill was named conference coach of the year for the 2009 season. The Blue Raiders went to another bowl in 2010, and they finished the season 6–7 after losing the GoDaddy.com Bowl.

After the successful 2009 season, he turned down several offers from other schools, including Conference USA's East Carolina and Memphis, citing that it was not the right time to leave the Blue Raiders. Stockstill has led MTSU to seven bowl games in 13 years.

In 2016, Stockstill led the Blue Raiders to an 8–5, 5–3 in C-USA play to finish in third place in the East Division. They were invited to the Hawaii Bowl where they lost to Hawaii.

In 2017, Stockstill led the Blue Raiders to a 7–6, 4–4 in C-USA play to finish for a tie in third place in the East Division. They were invited to the 2017 Camellia Bowl where they defeated Arkansas State.

Stockstill was fired after a 4–8 season in 2023.

=== Derek Mason era (2024–present) ===
On December 6, 2023, former Vanderbilt head coach, Derek Mason, was hired to be MTSU's next head coach.

== Conference affiliations ==
Middle Tennessee has been both an independent and affiliated with multiple conferences.

- Independent (1911–1951)
- Ohio Valley Conference (1952–1998)
- Independent (1999–2000)
- Sun Belt Conference (2001–2012)
- Conference USA (2013–present)

== Championships ==
=== Conference championships ===
Middle Tennessee has won 13 conference championships, seven outright and six shared.

Season	Conference	Coach	Overall Record	Conference Record
1956	Ohio Valley Conference	Charles M. Murphy	7–3	5–0
1957	Ohio Valley Conference	Charles M. Murphy	10–0	5–0
1958†	Ohio Valley Conference	Charles M. Murphy	8–2	5–1
1959†	Ohio Valley Conference	Charles M. Murphy	10–0–1	5–0–1
1962†	Ohio Valley Conference	Charles M. Murphy	6–4	4–2
1964	Ohio Valley Conference	Charles M. Murphy	8–2–1	6–1
1965	Ohio Valley Conference	Charles M. Murphy	10–0	7–0
1985	Ohio Valley Conference	Boots Donnelly	11–1	7–0
1989	Ohio Valley Conference	Boots Donnelly	9–4	6–0
1990†	Ohio Valley Conference	Boots Donnelly	11–2	5–1
1992	Ohio Valley Conference	Boots Donnelly	10–3	8–0
2001†	Sun Belt Conference	Andy McCollum	8–3	5–1
2006†	Sun Belt Conference	Rick Stockstill	7–6	6–1

† Co-championship

=== Division championships ===
As a member of Conference USA since 2013, Middle Tennessee competed in the East Division from that point through 2021, with Conference USA removing divisions from 2022 onwards. In that timeframe, the Blue Raiders had won one division title.

Season	Division	Coach	Opponent	CG result
2018	C-USA East	Rick Stockstill	UAB	L 25–27

== Head coaches ==
Middle Tennessee has had 16 head coaches since it began play during the 1911 season. Since December 2023, Derek Mason has served as head coach at Middle Tennessee.

== Bowl games ==
Middle Tennessee has appeared in 14 bowl games including four prior to joining NCAA Division I. The Blue Raiders have a record of 6–8 in those games. The Blue Raiders appeared twice in the Tangerine Bowl, now known as Citrus Bowl. The first game, played January 1, 1960, against Presbyterian, resulted in a 21–12 win. The second game, against Lamar Tech on December 29, 1961, was a 21–14 loss.

The Blue Raiders were invited to the Motor City Bowl in 2006 after a shared conference title with Troy. Troy earned a bid to the New Orleans Bowl with a tie-breaker over Middle Tennessee. Middle Tennessee was invited to the Motor City Bowl due to the Big Ten Conference having two teams in the Bowl Championship Series (BCS) and thus being unable to fulfill their bowl contract for the Motor City Bowl. This was the Blue Raiders' first bowl game in 42 years and their first since joining NCAA Division I. They played Central Michigan in the game and were defeated 31–14.

Middle Tennessee finished the 2009 regular season with a 9–3 record and was invited to play in the New Orleans Bowl on December 20. The team played against the Southern Miss, winning, 42–32. This was their second bowl game since joining the FBS and first ever bowl win. Quarterback Dwight Dasher was named as the game's MVP after rushing and passing for two touchdowns each.

Season	Coach	Bowl	Opponent	Result
1956	Charles M. Murphy	Refrigerator Bowl†	Sam Houston State	L 13–27
1959	Charles M. Murphy	Tangerine Bowl†	Presbyterian	W 21–12
1961	Charles M. Murphy	Tangerine Bowl†	Lamar Tech	L 14–21
1964	Charles M. Murphy	Grantland Rice Bowl†	Muskingum	W 20–0
2006	Rick Stockstill	Motor City Bowl	Central Michigan	L 14–31
2009	Rick Stockstill	New Orleans Bowl	Southern Miss	W 42–32
2010	Rick Stockstill	GoDaddy.com Bowl	Miami (OH)	L 21–35
2013	Rick Stockstill	Armed Forces Bowl	Navy	L 6–24
2015	Rick Stockstill	Bahamas Bowl	Western Michigan	L 31–45
2016	Rick Stockstill	Hawaii Bowl	Hawaii	L 35–52
2017	Rick Stockstill	Camellia Bowl	Arkansas State	W 35–30
2018	Rick Stockstill	New Orleans Bowl	Appalachian State	L 13–45
2021	Rick Stockstill	Bahamas Bowl	Toledo	W 31–24
2022	Rick Stockstill	Hawaii Bowl	San Diego State	W 25–23

†non-Division I bowl game

== NCAA Division I-AA playoff results ==
The Blue Raiders have made seven appearances in the Division I-AA/FCS playoffs, with an overall record of 6–7.

Year	Round	Opponent	Result
1984	First Round; Quarterfinals; Semifinals	Eastern Kentucky; Indiana State; Louisiana Tech	W 27–10; W 42–41 ^{3OT} L 13–21
1985	Quarterfinals	Georgia Southern	L 21–28
1989	First Round; Quarterfinals	Appalachian State; Georgia Southern	W 24–21; L 3–45
1990	First Round; Quarterfinals	Jackson State; Boise State	W 24–21; L 13–28
1991	First Round; Quarterfinals	Sam Houston State; Eastern Kentucky	W 20–19 ^{OT} L 13–23
1992	First Round; Quarterfinals	Appalachian State; Marshall	W 35–10; L 21–35
1994	First Round	Marshall	L 14–49

== Rivalries ==
=== Troy ===
Middle Tennessee's rivalry with Troy, now dormant following Middle Tennessee's 2013 move to Conference USA, is known as the Battle for the Palladium. Troy and Middle Tennessee first played each other in 1936, but it wasn't until 2003 that schools started playing annually for the Palladium Trophy. Middle Tennessee leads the series 12–9.

Middle Tennessee-Troy: All-Time Record
Games played	First meeting	Last meeting	Middle Tennessee wins	Middle Tennessee losses
21	October 9, 1936 (Won 19–0)	September 9, 2020 (Lost 47–14)	12	9

=== Western Kentucky ===
The rivalry between Middle Tennessee and Western Kentucky, is both school's oldest rivalry, as the two programs played together for several decades in the Ohio Valley Conference before both became members of the Sun Belt Conference and then transitioned to Conference USA about the same time. The name comes from the fact that the two universities are separated by about 100 miles.

Middle Tennessee-Western Kentucky: All-Time Record
Games played	First meeting	Last meeting	Middle Tennessee wins	Middle Tennessee losses	Series Ties
75	October 10, 1914 (Won 47–0)	November 15, 2025 (Lost 42–26)	35	39	1

== Nickname ==
The nickname of the Middle Tennessee athletic teams is the Blue Raiders. Female teams were long known as the Lady Raiders, but adopted the Blue Raiders name in 2007. The nickname's origin goes back to a 1934 newspaper contest. An MT football player, Charles Sarver, won $5 from Murfreesboro's The Daily News Journal with his winning entry "Blue Raiders", which he later admitted borrowing from Colgate University, whose teams were known as "Red Raiders" at the time. No official nickname existed prior to 1934, when teams were called "Normalites", "Teachers", and "Pedagogues".

== Colors and mascot ==
MT is represented by the colors white and royal blue, described as PMS 301 by the university.

Lightning is the mascot of both the Middle Tennessee men and women's sports teams.

== Retired numbers ==
The Blue Raiders has retired two jersey numbers.

Middle Tennessee Blue Raiders retired numbers
No.	Player	Pos.	Tenure	No. ret.	Ref.
14	Teddy Morris	QB	1962–1965	1965	
20	Kevin Byard	S	2012–2015	2022	

== All-time record vs. CUSA teams ==
Official record (including any NCAA imposed vacates and forfeits) against all current CUSA opponents through the 2025 season.

Opponent	Won	Lost	Tied	Percentage	Streak	First	Last
FIU	14	7	0	.667	Lost 2	2005	2025
Jacksonville State	14	4	2	.750	Lost 3	1927	2025
Kennesaw State	1	1	0	.500	Lost 1	2024	2025
Liberty	1	3	0	.250	Lost 3	1982	2024
New Mexico State	3	4	0	.429	Won 1	2001	2025
Sam Houston	2	2	0	.500	Won 1	1956	2025
Delaware	0	3	0	.000	Lost 3	1977	2025
Missouri State	1	1	0	.500	Lost 1	1986	2025
Western Kentucky	35	39	1	.473	Lost 7	1914	2025
Totals	71	64	3	.525			

== Future non-conference opponents ==
Announced schedules as of August 24, 2026.

2026	2027	2028	2029	2030	2031	2032	2033	2034	2035	2036
Murray State	at Auburn	Eastern Kentucky	Tennessee State	Southern Miss	UT Martin	Chattanooga	at Troy	Troy	Eastern Michigan	at Eastern Michigan
at Marshall	North Alabama	at Southern Miss	at Duke	at Northern Illinois	Army	Georgia Southern	Ball State	at Ball State		
at Kansas	at South Alabama	South Alabama	Northern Illinois		at Georgia Southern					
Nevada	Memphis									
