= Tennessee Tech Golden Eagles football =

Intercollegiate American football team

2026 Tennessee Tech Golden Eagles football team
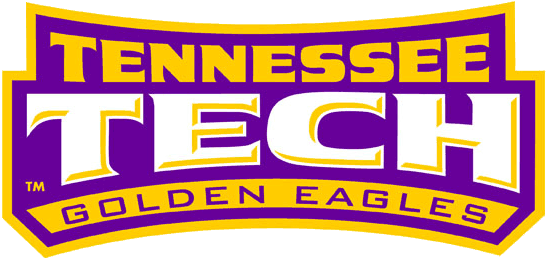
- First season: 1922; 104 years ago
- Head coach: Bobby Wilder; 3rd season, 18–7 (.720)
- Location: Cookeville, Tennessee
- Stadium: Tucker Stadium (capacity: 16,500)
- NCAA division: Division I FCS
- Conference: Southern Conference
- Colors: Purple and gold
- All-time record: 458–557–31 (.453)
- Bowl record: 0–3 (.000)

Conference championships
- OVC: 1952, 1953, 1955, 1958, 1959, 1960, 1961, 1972, 1975, 2011 OVC–Big South: 2024, 2025
- Mascot: Awesome Eagle
- Marching band: Golden Eagle Marching Band
- Website: ttusports.com

The Tennessee Tech Golden Eagles football program is the intercollegiate American football team for Tennessee Tech University, located in the U.S. state of Tennessee. The team competes in the NCAA Division I Football Championship Subdivision (FCS) and plays in the Southern Conference. They previously played in the OVC–Big South Football Association, a joint venture between Tech's former primary home of the Ohio Valley Conference and the Big South Conference. The school's first football team was fielded in 1922. The team plays its home games at the 16,500 seat Tucker Stadium and is coached by Bobby Wilder.

== Conference championships ==
Tennessee Tech has won twelve conference championships, six shared and six outright. Their twelve Ohio Valley titles are the most in the conference of any current member, behind only former conference member Eastern Kentucky.

Season	Coach	Conference	Overall record	Conference record
1952†	Preston Vaughn Overall	Ohio Valley Conference	9–2	4–1
1953	Preston Vaughn Overall	Ohio Valley Conference	7–4	5–0
1955	Wilburn Tucker	Ohio Valley Conference	7–3	5–0
1958†	Wilburn Tucker	Ohio Valley Conference	7–3	5–1
1959†	Wilburn Tucker	Ohio Valley Conference	6–2–2	5–0–1
1960	Wilburn Tucker	Ohio Valley Conference	8–3	6–0
1961	Wilburn Tucker	Ohio Valley Conference	7–3	6–0
1972	Don Wade	Ohio Valley Conference	10–2	7–0
1975†	Don Wade	Ohio Valley Conference	8–3	6–1
2011†	Watson Brown	Ohio Valley Conference	7–4	6–2
2024†	Bobby Wilder	OVC–Big South Football Association	7–5	6–2
2025	Bobby Wilder	OVC–Big South Football Association	11–2	8–0

† Co-championship

== Postseason ==
=== Bowl games ===
The Golden Eagles have appeared in three bowl games, with an overall record of 0–3.

Season	Coach	Bowl	Opponent	Result
1952	Preston Vaughn Overall	Tangerine Bowl	East Texas State	L 0–33
1960	Wilburn Tucker	Tangerine Bowl	The Citadel	L 0–27
1972	Don Wade	Grantland Rice Bowl	Louisiana Tech	L 0–35

=== NCAA Division I-AA/FCS playoffs ===
The Golden Eagles have made two appearances in the Division I-AA/FCS playoffs, with an overall record of 0–2.

Year	Round	Opponent	Result
2011	First Round	Central Arkansas	L 14–34
2025	First Round	North Dakota	L 6–31

== Head coaches ==
Seasons	Coach	Record
1922	Loyal Duyck	2–1–4
1923–1946, 1952–1953	Preston Vaughn Overall	97–96–18
1947–1949	Hooper Eblen	12–19
1950–1951	Star Wood	9–12–1
1954–1967	Wilburn Tucker	70–65–5
1968–1982	Don Wade	81–78–3
1983–1985	Gary Darnell	3–29
1986–1995	Jim Ragland	42–66
1996–2006	Mike Hennigan	52–57
2007–2015	Watson Brown	42–60
2016–2017	Marcus Satterfield	6–16
2018–2023	Dewayne Alexander	20–43
2024–present	Bobby Wilder	18–7

== Notable former players ==
- Barry Wilmore
- Larry Schreiber
- Elois Grooms
- Mike Hennigan
- Lonnie Warwick
- Jim Youngblood
- Da'Rick Rogers
- Howard Stidham
- Frank Omiyale
- Wade Plemons
- Tom Squires

== Future non-conference opponents ==
Announced schedules as of February 28, 2026.

2026	2027	2028
Monmouth	Morehead State	Morehead State
Eastern Kentucky	Eastern Illinois	Montana State
at Mississippi State	at Montana State	at Eastern Kentucky
