= List of Carolinas Conference football standings =

This is a list of yearly Carolinas Conference football standings.

== Carolinas Conference football standings ==
=== Early history (1930–1955) ===
1930 North State Conference football standings
	Conf.					Overall
Team	W		L		T	W		L		T
Catawba $	5	–	0	–	0	8	–	0	–	1
Elon	4	–	1	–	0	6	–	3	–	0
Guilford	2	–	2	–	0	4	–	5	–	1
High Point	1	–	2	–	1	2	–	6	–	2
Lenoir–Rhyne	1	–	3	–	1	3	–	6	–	1
Atlantic Christian	0	–	5	–	0	1	–	7	–	0
$ – Conference champion

1931 North State Conference football standings
	Conf.					Overall
Team	W		L		T	W		L		T
Appalachian State $	3	–	0	–	0	9	–	2	–	2
Catawba	2	–	1	–	0	7	–	3	–	1
Guilford	2	–	1	–	0	5	–	6	–	0
Elon	2	–	1	–	0	3	–	5	–	0
Lenoir–Rhyne	1	–	4	–	0	3	–	7	–	0
High Point	1	–	4	–	0	2	–	7	–	0
$ – Conference champion

1932 North State Conference football standings
	Conf.					Overall
Team	W		L		T	W		L		T
Catawba $	4	–	0	–	0	6	–	2	–	1
Lenoir–Rhyne *	4	–	1	–	0	5	–	4	–	1
Guilford	2	–	2	–	0	3	–	7	–	0
High Point	2	–	3	–	0	2	–	6	–	0
Appalachian State *	0	–	3	–	0	4	–	5	–	1
Elon	0	–	3	–	0	2	–	6	–	0
$ – Conference champion; * — Appalachian State forfeited a win over Lenoir–Rhyne due to an ineligible player.

1933 North State Conference football standings
	Conf.					Overall
Team	W		L		T	W		L		T
Elon $	2	–	0	–	1	5	–	3	–	1
Appalachian State	1	–	0	–	0	7	–	2	–	0
Lenoir Rhyne	2	–	1	–	1	3	–	3	–	3
Catawba	1	–	1	–	1	2	–	5	–	2
Guilford	1	–	1	–	1	2	–	7	–	1
Western Carolina	0	–	4	–	0	1	–	7	–	1
$ – Conference champion

1934 North State Conference football standings
	Conf.					Overall
Team	W		L		T	W		L		T
Elon $	3	–	0	–	1	6	–	2	–	1
Catawba	2	–	0	–	2	5	–	2	–	3
Appalachian State *	1	–	0	–	0	3	–	4	–	1
Lenoir Rhyne	2	–	1	–	1	5	–	4	–	1
Guilford	1	–	3	–	0	2	–	7	–	0
Western Carolina	0	–	5	–	0	3	–	7	–	0
$ – Conference champion; * – Appalachian State was ineligible for championship because of limited conference schedule.

1935 North State Conference football standings
	Conf.					Overall
Team	W		L		T	W		L		T
Elon $	3	–	0	–	0	6	–	3	–	0
Appalachian State	1	–	0	–	1	5	–	2	–	2
Catawba	3	–	1	–	0	8	–	2	–	0
Lenoir Rhyne	2	–	2	–	1	4	–	4	–	1
Guilford	1	–	3	–	0	1	–	9	–	0
Western Carolina	0	–	4	–	0	1	–	10	–	0
$ – Conference champion

1936 North State Conference football standings
	Conf.					Overall
Team	W		L		T	W		L		T
Elon $	3	–	0	–	0	6	–	5	–	0
Appalachian State	3	–	1	–	0	5	–	2	–	2
Catawba	3	–	2	–	0	5	–	5	–	0
Lenoir Rhyne	2	–	3	–	0	3	–	6	–	1
Western Carolina	1	–	2	–	0	2	–	7	–	0
Guilford	0	–	4	–	0	2	–	7	–	0
$ – Conference champion

1937 North State Conference football standings
	Conf.					Overall
Team	W		L		T	W		L		T
Appalachian State $	5	–	0	–	0	8	–	1	–	1
Elon	3	–	1	–	0	7	–	1	–	0
Catawba	3	–	2	–	0	8	–	2	–	0
Lenoir Rhyne	2	–	3	–	0	4	–	5	–	2
Western Carolina	0	–	3	–	0	1	–	6	–	2
Guilford	0	–	3	–	0	1	–	7	–	0
$ – Conference champion

1938 North State Conference football standings
	Conf.					Overall
Team	W		L		T	W		L		T
Catawba +	4	–	1	–	0	7	–	2	–	1
Elon +	4	–	1	–	0	6	–	3	–	0
Appalachian State	3	–	1	–	0	9	–	1	–	0
Lenoir Rhyne	4	–	2	–	0	4	–	3	–	2
Guilford	0	–	3	–	1	1	–	5	–	2
High Point	0	–	4	–	1	2	–	4	–	1
Western Carolina	0	–	3	–	0	0	–	7	–	1
+ – Conference co-champions

1939 North State Conference football standings
	Conf.					Overall
Team	W		L		T	W		L		T
Appalachian State +	3	–	0	–	1	7	–	1	–	2
Lenoir Rhyne +	4	–	0	–	2	6	–	1	–	3
Elon	4	–	2	–	0	5	–	5	–	0
Catawba	2	–	1	–	1	6	–	2	–	2
High Point	2	–	4	–	0	4	–	6	–	0
Western Carolina	0	–	4	–	1	1	–	6	–	1
Guilford	0	–	4	–	1	1	–	7	–	1
+ – Conference co-champions

1940 North State Conference football standings
	Conf.					Overall
Team	W		L		T	W		L		T
Catawba $	4	–	0	–	0	8	–	1	–	0
Elon	5	–	1	–	0	5	–	2	–	1
Lenoir Rhyne	4	–	2	–	0	6	–	3	–	0
Appalachian State	2	–	2	–	0	6	–	4	–	0
High Point	2	–	3	–	0	5	–	4	–	1
Western Carolina	1	–	4	–	0	2	–	5	–	1
Guilford	0	–	6	–	0	0	–	9	–	0
$ – Conference champion

1941 North State Conference football standings
	Conf.					Overall
Team	W		L		T	W		L		T
Elon $	6	–	0	–	0	8	–	1	–	0
Catawba	4	–	1	–	0	8	–	3	–	0
Lenoir Rhyne	3	–	3	–	0	4	–	6	–	0
Western Carolina	2	–	2	–	0	3	–	5	–	0
Appalachian State	2	–	3	–	0	4	–	5	–	0
High Point	1	–	5	–	0	2	–	7	–	0
Guilford	0	–	4	–	0	0	–	7	–	0
$ – Conference champion

1942 North State Conference football standings
	Conf.					Overall
Team	W		L		T	W		L		T
Catawba $	4	–	0	–	0	9	–	2	–	0
Appalachian State	2	–	2	–	0	5	–	2	–	1
High Point	1	–	4	–	0	1	–	6	–	1
Guilford	0	–	1	–	0	0	–	6	–	0
$ – Conference champion

1945 North State Conference football standings
	Conf.					Overall
Team	W		L		T	W		L		T
High Point +	5	–	0	–	0	5	–	0	–	1
Catawba +	2	–	0	–	0	10	–	1	–	0
Appalachian State	1	–	3	–	0	1	–	6	–	0
Western Carolina	0	–	2	–	0	1	–	3	–	0
Guilford	0	–	3	–	0	0	–	7	–	0
+ – Conference co-champions

1946 North State Conference football standings
	Conf.					Overall
Team	W		L		T	W		L		T
Catawba $	5	–	0	–	0	10	–	2	–	0
Appalachian State	4	–	1	–	0	6	–	3	–	0
High Point	3	–	2	–	1	7	–	2	–	1
Western Carolina	1	–	1	–	1	6	–	3	–	1
Lenoir Rhyne	3	–	5	–	0	5	–	6	–	0
Guilford	1	–	2	–	1	6	–	2	–	1
Elon	1	–	4	–	1	4	–	5	–	1
Atlantic Christian	0	–	3	–	0	2	–	4	–	1
$ – Conference champion

1947 North State Conference football standings
	Conf.					Overall
Team	W		L		T	W		L		T
Catawba $	6	–	0	–	0	11	–	1	–	0
Appalachian State	6	–	1	–	0	9	–	1	–	0
Lenoir Rhyne	4	–	3	–	1	5	–	4	–	1
High Point	3	–	3	–	1	5	–	4	–	2
Guilford	2	–	3	–	0	4	–	6	–	0
Western Carolina	2	–	3	–	0	3	–	5	–	1
Elon	2	–	5	–	0	4	–	6	–	0
East Carolina	1	–	3	–	0	3	–	6	–	0
Atlantic Christian	0	–	5	–	0	0	–	8	–	0
$ – Conference champion

1948 North State Conference football standings
	Conf.					Overall
Team	W		L		T	W		L		T
Appalachian State $	7	–	0	–	1	8	–	1	–	1
Western Carolina	3	–	1	–	0	7	–	3	–	0
Catawba	5	–	2	–	0	5	–	4	–	1
Lenoir Rhyne	5	–	2	–	1	6	–	3	–	1
High Point	4	–	3	–	1	5	–	3	–	2
Elon	3	–	4	–	1	4	–	5	–	1
Guilford	1	–	5	–	0	4	–	6	–	0
Atlantic Christian	1	–	6	–	0	2	–	7	–	0
East Carolina	0	–	6	–	0	0	–	9	–	0
$ – Conference champion

1949 North State Conference football standings
	Conf.					Overall
Team	W		L		T	W		L		T
Western Carolina $	4	–	0	–	0	8	–	3	–	0
Appalachian State	6	–	2	–	0	8	–	3	–	0
Elon	5	–	2	–	0	8	–	2	–	0
Catawba	4	–	2	–	0	5	–	5	–	0
Lenoir Rhyne	5	–	3	–	0	7	–	3	–	0
Guilford	2	–	3	–	1	4	–	5	–	1
East Carolina	1	–	4	–	1	4	–	5	–	1
Atlantic Christian	0	–	5	–	2	1	–	7	–	2
High Point	0	–	6	–	0	0	–	9	–	0
$ – Conference champion

1950 North State Conference football standings
	Conf.					Overall
Team	W		L		T	W		L		T
Appalachian State $	7	–	0	–	1	9	–	2	–	1
Elon	6	–	1	–	1	7	–	2	–	1
Lenoir Rhyne	6	–	2	–	0	8	–	2	–	0
East Carolina	5	–	2	–	0	7	–	3	–	0
Catawba	2	–	3	–	0	4	–	6	–	0
Guilford	2	–	5	–	0	4	–	5	–	0
Western Carolina	1	–	4	–	0	3	–	6	–	0
Atlantic Christian	0	–	5	–	0	2	–	7	–	0
High Point	0	–	7	–	0	1	–	8	–	0
$ – Conference champion

1951 North State Conference football standings
	Conf.					Overall
Team	W		L		T	W		L		T
Lenoir Rhyne $	6	–	0	–	0	10	–	1	–	0
Elon	4	–	2	–	0	6	–	3	–	0
Catawba	3	–	2	–	0	5	–	5	–	0
Appalachian State	3	–	3	–	0	6	–	3	–	0
East Carolina	1	–	4	–	0	4	–	6	–	0
Western Carolina	1	–	4	–	0	3	–	6	–	0
Guilford	1	–	4	–	0	1	–	7	–	0
$ – Conference champion

1952 North State Conference football standings
	Conf.					Overall
Team	W		L		T	W		L		T
Lenoir Rhyne $	6	–	0	–	0	8	–	1	–	0
East Carolina	4	–	1	–	1	6	–	3	–	2
Catawba	4	–	1	–	1	4	–	5	–	1
Appalachian State	2	–	4	–	0	2	–	6	–	1
Western Carolina	1	–	4	–	0	2	–	8	–	0
Guilford	1	–	4	–	0	1	–	7	–	0
Elon	1	–	5	–	0	3	–	6	–	1
$ – Conference champion

1953 North State Conference football standings
	Conf.					Overall
Team	W		L		T	W		L		T
East Carolina $	6	–	0	–	0	8	–	2	–	0
Catawba	4	–	1	–	1	4	–	5	–	1
Appalachian State	3	–	3	–	0	6	–	4	–	0
Lenoir Rhyne	3	–	3	–	0	4	–	5	–	0
Guilford	2	–	3	–	0	3	–	5	–	0
Elon	1	–	4	–	1	1	–	6	–	1
Western Carolina	0	–	5	–	0	1	–	9	–	0
$ – Conference champion

1954 North State Conference football standings
	Conf.					Overall
Team	W		L		T	W		L		T
Appalachian State $	6	–	0	–	0	8	–	3	–	0
Elon	4	–	1	–	1	5	–	3	–	1
East Carolina	3	–	2	–	0	5	–	4	–	1
Western Carolina	2	–	2	–	1	4	–	5	–	1
Catawba	2	–	4	–	0	3	–	8	–	0
Guilford	1	–	3	–	0	1	–	7	–	0
Lenoir Rhyne	0	–	6	–	0	2	–	7	–	1
$ – Conference champion

1955 North State Conference football standings
	Conf.					Overall
Team	W		L		T	W		L		T
Lenoir Rhyne $	6	–	0	–	0	10	–	0	–	0
Catawba *	4	–	2	–	0	6	–	4	–	0
East Carolina	3	–	2	–	0	4	–	5	–	0
Appalachian State	3	–	3	–	0	3	–	6	–	0
Elon	2	–	4	–	0	3	–	7	–	0
Western Carolina *	1	–	4	–	0	1	–	8	–	1
Guilford	0	–	4	–	0	0	–	7	–	1
$ – Conference champion; * – Western Carolina forfeited a win over Catawba.

=== NAIA (1956–1969) ===
1956 North State Conference football standings
	Conf.					Overall
Team	W		L		T	W		L		T
Lenoir Rhyne $	6	–	0	–	0	10	–	0	–	0
Catawba	4	–	2	–	0	5	–	4	–	1
Elon	4	–	2	–	0	5	–	5	–	0
Appalachian State	3	–	3	–	0	3	–	6	–	0
East Carolina	2	–	3	–	0	2	–	7	–	1
Guilford	0	–	4	–	0	1	–	7	–	0
Western Carolina	0	–	5	–	0	1	–	9	–	0
$ – Conference champion

1957 North State Conference football standings
	Conf.					Overall
Team	W		L		T	W		L		T
Lenoir Rhyne $	5	–	1	–	0	8	–	2	–	1
Elon	4	–	0	–	0	6	–	0	–	0
Catawba	3	–	2	–	0	4	–	3	–	0
Western Carolina	2	–	2	–	1	2	–	5	–	1
Appalachian State	2	–	4	–	0	4	–	6	–	0
Guilford	1	–	3	–	1	1	–	6	–	1
East Carolina	0	–	5	–	0	1	–	8	–	0
$ – Conference champion

1958 North State Conference football standings
	Conf.					Overall
Team	W		L		T	W		L		T
Lenoir Rhyne $	6	–	0	–	0	9	–	1	–	0
Appalachian State	4	–	2	–	0	6	–	4	–	0
East Carolina	4	–	2	–	0	6	–	4	–	0
Catawba	2	–	3	–	1	5	–	3	–	2
Elon	2	–	4	–	0	3	–	6	–	0
Western Carolina	1	–	4	–	1	1	–	8	–	1
Guilford	1	–	5	–	0	3	–	6	–	0
$ – Conference champion

1959 North State Conference football standings
	Conf.					Overall
Team	W		L		T	W		L		T
No. Lenoir Rhyne $^	6	–	0	–	0	10	–	1	–	0
Appalachian State	5	–	1	–	0	6	–	4	–	0
Western Carolina	4	–	2	–	0	7	–	2	–	1
East Carolina	3	–	3	–	0	5	–	6	–	0
Catawba	2	–	4	–	0	2	–	7	–	1
Guilford	1	–	5	–	0	2	–	7	–	0
Elon	0	–	6	–	0	1	–	9	–	0
$ – Conference champion; ^ – NAIA playoff participant; Rankings from NAIA poll

1960 North State Conference football standings
	Conf.					Overall
Team	W		L		T	W		L		T
No. 1/2 Lenoir Rhyne $^	6	–	0	–	0	12	–	0	–	0
Appalachian State	5	–	1	–	0	8	–	2	–	0
East Carolina	4	–	2	–	0	7	–	3	–	0
Western Carolina	2	–	4	–	0	6	–	5	–	0
Elon	2	–	4	–	0	4	–	6	–	0
Catawba	2	–	4	–	0	2	–	9	–	0
Guilford	0	–	6	–	0	1	–	8	–	0
$ – Conference champion; ^ – NAIA playoff participant; Rankings from NAIA poll and AP small college poll

1961 Carolinas Conference football standings
	Conf.					Overall
Team	W		L		T	W		L		T
No. 15 Lenoir Rhyne $	6	–	1	–	0	8	–	1	–	1
Appalachian State	5	–	1	–	0	7	–	3	–	0
Newberry	4	–	2	–	0	5	–	5	–	1
East Carolina	4	–	3	–	0	5	–	4	–	1
Elon	3	–	4	–	0	4	–	6	–	0
Catawba	3	–	4	–	0	3	–	7	–	0
Western Carolina	2	–	5	–	0	4	–	6	–	0
Guilford	0	–	7	–	0	0	–	9	–	0
$ – Conference champion; Rankings from NAIA poll

1962 Carolinas Conference football standings
	Conf.					Overall
Team	W		L		T	W		L		T
No. 3 Lenoir Rhyne $^	6	–	0	–	0	11	–	1	–	0
Elon	4	–	2	–	0	7	–	3	–	0
Appalachian State	2	–	1	–	2	4	–	4	–	2
Newberry	3	–	2	–	0	6	–	5	–	0
Western Carolina	1	–	4	–	1	3	–	5	–	1
Catawba	1	–	4	–	1	3	–	6	–	1
Guilford	1	–	5	–	0	2	–	7	–	0
$ – Conference champion; ^ – NAIA playoff participant; Rankings from NAIA poll

1963 Carolinas Conference football standings
	Conf.					Overall
Team	W		L		T	W		L		T
Catawba +	5	–	1	–	0	6	–	3	–	0
Elon +	5	–	1	–	0	6	–	4	–	0
Appalachian State	4	–	1	–	0	6	–	3	–	0
Newberry	3	–	3	–	0	5	–	5	–	0
Lenoir Rhyne	2	–	4	–	0	4	–	6	–	0
Western Carolina	1	–	5	–	0	2	–	6	–	1
Guilford	0	–	5	–	0	0	–	10	–	0
$ – Conference champion

1964 Carolinas Conference football standings
	Conf.					Overall
Team	W		L		T	W		L		T
No. 20 Elon $	4	–	1	–	1	8	–	1	–	1
Western Carolina	4	–	2	–	0	5	–	4	–	0
Appalachian State	3	–	2	–	0	6	–	3	–	0
Catawba	3	–	3	–	0	5	–	6	–	0
Lenoir Rhyne	2	–	3	–	1	3	–	6	–	1
Guilford	2	–	3	–	0	4	–	6	–	0
Newberry	1	–	5	–	0	1	–	9	–	0
$ – Conference champion; Rankings from NAIA poll

1965 Carolinas Conference football standings
	Conf.					Overall
Team	W		L		T	W		L		T
Lenoir Rhyne $	6	–	0	–	0	7	–	3	–	0
Guilford	3	–	1	–	0	8	–	2	–	0
Western Carolina	5	–	2	–	0	7	–	2	–	0
Catawba	3	–	3	–	0	7	–	3	–	0
Appalachian State	3	–	3	–	0	5	–	5	–	0
Newberry	3	–	4	–	0	3	–	7	–	0
Presbyterian	1	–	4	–	0	5	–	5	–	0
Elon	0	–	7	–	0	2	–	8	–	0
$ – Conference champion

1966 Carolinas Conference football standings
	Conf.					Overall
Team	W		L		T	W		L		T
Lenoir Rhyne +	5	–	2	–	0	6	–	3	–	0
Presbyterian +	5	–	2	–	0	6	–	4	–	0
Guilford	4	–	2	–	1	5	–	4	–	1
Catawba	4	–	3	–	0	5	–	5	–	0
Newberry	3	–	3	–	1	4	–	5	–	1
Western Carolina	3	–	4	–	0	5	–	5	–	0
Appalachian State	2	–	5	–	0	3	–	6	–	1
Elon	1	–	6	–	0	1	–	9	–	0
+ – Conference co-champions

1967 Carolinas Conference football standings
	Conf.					Overall
Team	W		L		T	W		L		T
No. 9 Lenoir Rhyne $	6	–	1	–	0	8	–	1	–	0
Appalachian State	5	–	2	–	0	7	–	3	–	0
Elon	4	–	2	–	1	5	–	3	–	1
Presbyterian	4	–	3	–	0	5	–	4	–	1
Guilford	3	–	4	–	0	6	–	4	–	0
Catawba	2	–	4	–	1	5	–	4	–	1
Western Carolina	2	–	4	–	1	4	–	5	–	1
Newberry	0	–	6	–	1	1	–	8	–	1
$ – Conference champion; Rankings from NAIA poll

1968 Carolinas Conference football standings
	Conf.					Overall
Team	W		L		T	W		L		T
Lenoir Rhyne +	5	–	1	–	0	7	–	2	–	0
Presbyterian +	5	–	1	–	0	7	–	4	–	0
Elon	3	–	3	–	0	4	–	5	–	0
Western Carolina	3	–	3	–	0	4	–	5	–	0
Newberry	2	–	4	–	0	3	–	7	–	0
Catawba	2	–	4	–	0	2	–	8	–	0
Guilford	1	–	5	–	0	2	–	8	–	0
+ – Conference co-champions

1969 Carolinas Conference football standings
	Conf.					Overall
Team	W		L		T	W		L		T
Elon $	5	–	0	–	0	7	–	3	–	0
Lenoir Rhyne	4	–	1	–	0	6	–	4	–	0
Presbyterian	3	–	2	–	0	5	–	6	–	0
Newberry	2	–	3	–	0	5	–	5	–	0
Catawba	1	–	4	–	0	2	–	8	–	0
Guilford	0	–	5	–	0	2	–	7	–	0
$ – Conference champion; Catawba forfeited wins over Newberry, Elon, and Presbyterian. Guilford forfeited wins over Newberry and Catawba.

=== NAIA Division I (1970–1974) ===
1970 Carolinas Conference football standings
	Conf.					Overall
Team	W		L		T	W		L		T
Presbyterian $	5	–	0	–	0	8	–	3	–	0
Lenoir Rhyne	4	–	1	–	0	7	–	4	–	0
Catawba	2	–	3	–	0	5	–	5	–	0
Elon	2	–	3	–	0	3	–	7	–	0
Newberry	1	–	4	–	0	4	–	7	–	0
Guilford	1	–	4	–	0	2	–	8	–	0
$ – Conference champion

1973 Carolinas Conference football standings
	Conf.					Overall
Team	W		L		T	W		L		T
No. 2/10 Elon $^	4	–	0	–	0	12	–	1	–	0
Lenoir Rhyne	2	–	1	–	0	5	–	5	–	1
Mars Hill	2	–	2	–	0	5	–	6	–	0
Catawba	1	–	3	–	0	5	–	5	–	0
Guilford	0	–	3	–	0	1	–	9	–	0
$ – Conference champion; ^ – NAIA Division I playoff participant; Rankings from NAIA Division I poll and AP small college poll

1971 Carolinas Conference football standings
	Conf.					Overall
Team	W		L		T	W		L		T
Elon $	5	–	0	–	0	8	–	3	–	0
Newberry	3	–	1	–	1	8	–	2	–	1
Presbyterian	3	–	2	–	0	8	–	3	–	0
Catawba	2	–	3	–	0	5	–	6	–	0
Lenoir Rhyne	1	–	3	–	1	2	–	7	–	1
Guilford	0	–	5	–	0	0	–	10	–	0
$ – Conference champion

1974 Carolinas Conference football standings
	Conf.					Overall
Team	W		L		T	W		L		T
No. 4/15 Elon $^	4	–	0	–	0	10	–	2	–	0
Lenoir Rhyne	2	–	1	–	0	7	–	3	–	1
Catawba	1	–	2	–	1	5	–	4	–	1
Mars Hill	1	–	3	–	0	7	–	4	–	0
Guilford	0	–	2	–	1	7	–	3	–	1
$ – Conference champion; ^ – NAIA Division I playoff participant; Rankings from NAIA Division I poll and AP small college poll

1972 Carolinas Conference football standings
	Conf.					Overall
Team	W		L		T	W		L		T
No. 20 Presbyterian +	4	–	0	–	1	7	–	2	–	1
Elon +	4	–	0	–	1	7	–	3	–	1
Newberry	3	–	2	–	0	6	–	4	–	1
Catawba	2	–	3	–	0	5	–	5	–	0
Lenoir Rhyne	1	–	4	–	0	5	–	6	–	0
Guilford	0	–	5	–	0	0	–	9	–	0
Mars Hill *	0	–	0	–	0	4	–	5	–	0
+ – Conference co-champions; * – Did not compete for conference title; Rankings from NAIA Division I poll

=== NCAA Division II (2025–present) ===
2025 Conference Carolinas football standings
	Conf.			Overall
Team	W		L	W		L
North Greenville y$^	6	–	0	7	–	5
UNC Pembroke y	5	–	1	8	–	3
Ferrum*	3	–	3	4	–	7
Barton	3	–	3	3	–	8
Chowan	2	–	4	4	–	7
Shorter	1	–	5	2	–	9
Erskine	1	–	5	1	–	10
Championship: North Greenville 34, UNC Pembroke 20
$ – Conference champion; y – Championship game participant; ^ – NCAA Division II playoff participant; * – Ferrum ineligible for postseason play due to transition from NCAA Division III; Rankings from AFCA poll
