= List of East Carolina Pirates football seasons =

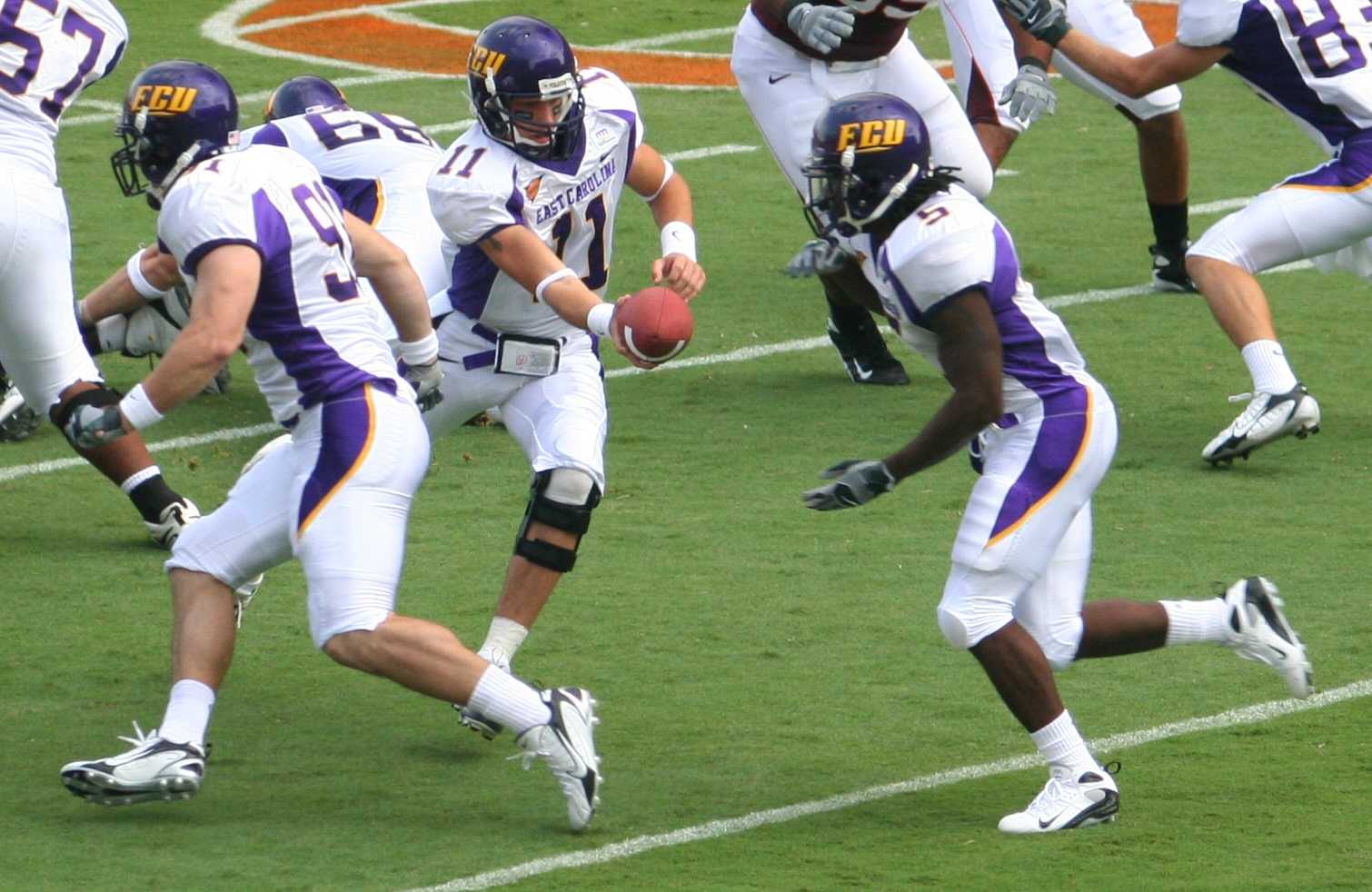
Quarterback Brett Clay hands off the ball to his tailback Chris Johnson in the Pirates' 2007 opener at Virginia Tech

This is a list of football seasons completed by the East Carolina Pirates since the team's creation in 1932 under Coach Kenneth Beatty. Since that first season, the Pirates have played over 800 regular-season games and 22 bowl games.

Historically, East Carolina has seen moderate success. While East Carolina's first ten years of football included only three winning seasons, the team has recorded one undefeated season and a share of the Small College National Championship in 1941, along with several one-loss seasons since their early struggles. Football was called off for the 1942, 1943, and 1944 seasons due to World War II. After the three-season hiatus, the Pirates joined the North State Conference. East Carolina won its first championship—the North State Conference championship—in 1953. In its 15 years as a member of the North State Conference, the Pirates won two championships and went to two bowl games. In 1962, the team left the conference and returned to its previous status as a football independent. During two of those years, the Pirates went 9–1.

In 1965, the Pirates accepted membership in the Southern Conference. The team won the Southern Conference championship under coach Clarence Stasavich in the following year, but did not win another conference championship until 1972. The 1972 team was coached by Sonny Randle, who won the Southern Conference championship in his second year as head coach. In 1973, he again coached a conference-championship team—the only time in school history the team won two conference championships in a row. Randle left to take a position as head football coach of Virginia in 1974 and was replaced by Pat Dye. Dye, in his third year, won the Pirates' fourth Southern Conference championship. In 1977, ECU left the Southern Conference and had three more winning seasons as a football independent. In 1980, under new head coach Ed Emory, the Pirates had their first losing season since 1971. The team struggled over the next two years. In 1983, Emory's Pirates ended the season ranked as one of the top 25 teams in the country by the Associated Press.

The next seven seasons included just one winning season—1989. The Pirates gradually rebuilt the program, and the 1991 team, coached by Bill Lewis, went 11–1, losing only to Illinois in the season opener. The team capped off the season with an in-state win over North Carolina State in the Peach Bowl. Following the win, the Pirates entered the offseason ranked ninth in both the AP and Coaches Poll. Thanks to his performance during the year, Lewis was awarded the American Football Coaches Association Coach of the Year award. The season marked the only time the Pirates finished the season ranked in the top 10. In 1995, ECU won the Liberty Bowl over Stanford and finished 23rd in the Coaches' Poll. The Pirates joined Conference USA (C-USA) in 1997, ending their status as football independents for the first time since 1976. Since joining the C-USA, the Pirates have had nine winning seasons, seven losing seasons, and one 6–6 year. In 2014, the Pirates joined the American Athletic Conference as full members.

== Seasons ==
Conference champions	Bowl game berth

Season	Conference	Season results				Bowl result	Final ranking	
Season	Conference	Conference finish	Wins	Losses	Ties	Bowl result	AP Poll	Coaches Poll
East Carolina Pirates football seasons
1932	Independent	—	0	5	0	—	N/A	N/A
1933	Independent	—	1	5	0	—	N/A	N/A
1934	Independent	—	1	4	1	—	N/A	N/A
1935	Independent	—	3	3	0	—	N/A	N/A
1936	Independent	—	3	2	0	—	—	N/A
1937	Independent	—	2	5	0	—	—	N/A
1938	Independent	—	1	6	1	—	—	N/A
1939	Independent	—	0	8	0	—	—	N/A
1940	Independent	—	5	3	0	—	—	N/A
1941	Independent	—	7	0	0	—	—	N/A
1942	East Carolina did not play football during the 1942–1945 seasons because of World War II							
1943	East Carolina did not play football during the 1942–1945 seasons because of World War II							
1944	East Carolina did not play football during the 1942–1945 seasons because of World War II							
1945	East Carolina did not play football during the 1942–1945 seasons because of World War II							
1946	Independent	—	5	3	1	—	—	N/A
1947	North State Conference	—	3	6	0	—	—	N/A
1948	North State Conference	—	0	9	0	—	—	N/A
1949	North State Conference	—	4	5	1	—	—	N/A
1950	North State Conference	—	7	3	0	—	—	—
1951	North State Conference	—	4	6	0	—	—	—
1952	North State Conference	—	6	3	2	Lost Lions Bowl vs. Clarion 13–6	—	—
1953	North State Conference	—	8	2	0	Lost Elks Bowl vs. Morris Harvey 12–0	—	—
1954	North State Conference	—	5	4	1	—	—	—
1955	North State Conference	—	4	5	0	—	—	—
1956	North State Conference	—	2	7	1	—	—	—
1957	North State Conference	—	1	8	0	—	—	—
1958	North State Conference	—	6	4	0	—	—	—
1959	North State Conference	—	5	6	0	—	—	—
1960	North State Conference	—	7	3	0	—	—	—
1961	Carolinas Conference	—	5	4	1	—	—	—
1962	Independent	—	5	4	0	—	—	—
1963	Independent	—	9	1	0	Won Eastern Bowl vs. Northeastern 27–6	—	—
1964	Independent	—	9	1	0	Won Tangerine Bowl vs. Massachusetts 14–13	—	—
1965	Southern Conference	3	9	1	0	Won Tangerine Bowl vs. Maine 31–0	—	—
1966	Southern Conference	1	4	5	1	—	—	—
1967	Southern Conference	2	8	2	0	—	—	—
1968	Southern Conference	3	4	6	0	—	—	—
1969	Southern Conference	5	2	7	0	—	—	—
1970	Southern Conference	4	3	8	0	—	—	—
1971	Southern Conference	4	4	6	0	—	—	—
1972	Southern Conference	1	9	2	0	—	—	—
1973	Southern Conference	1	9	2	0	—	—	—
1974	Southern Conference	3	7	4	0	—	—	—
1975	Southern Conference	2	8	3	0	—	—	—
1976	Southern Conference	1	9	2	0	—	—	—
1977	Independent	—	8	3	0	—	—	—
1978	Independent	—	9	3	0	Won Independence Bowl vs. Louisiana Tech 35–13	—	—
1979	Independent	—	7	3	1	—	—	—
1980	Independent	—	4	7	0	—	—	—
1981	Independent	—	5	6	0	—	—	—
1982	Independent	—	7	4	0	—	—	—
1983	Independent	—	8	3	0	—	20	—
1984	Independent	—	2	9	0	—	—	—
1985	Independent	—	2	9	0	—	—	—
1986	Independent	—	3	8	0	—	—	—
1987	Independent	—	5	6	0	—	—	—
1988	Independent	—	3	8	0	—	—	—
1989	Independent	—	6	5	0	—	—	—
1990	Independent	—	5	6	0	—	—	—
1991	Independent	—	11	1	0	Won Peach Bowl vs. NC State 37–34	9	9
1992	Independent	—	5	6	0	—	—	—
1993	Independent	—	2	9	0	—	—	—
1994	Independent	—	7	5	0	Lost Liberty Bowl vs. Illinois 30–0	—	—
1995	Independent	—	9	3	0	Won Liberty Bowl vs. Stanford 19–13	—	23
1996	Independent	—	8	3		—	—	—
1997	Conference USA	3	5	6		—	—	—
1998	Conference USA	4	6	5		—	—	—
1999	Conference USA	2	9	3		Lost Mobile Alabama Bowl vs. Texas Christian 28–14	—	—
2000	Conference USA	3	8	4		Won Galleryfurniture.com Bowl vs. Texas Tech 40–27	—	—
2001	Conference USA	3	6	6		Lost GMAC Bowl vs. Marshall 64–61	—	—
2002	Conference USA	7	4	8		—	—	—
2003	Conference USA	10	1	11		—	—	—
2004	Conference USA	10	2	9		—	—	—
2005	Conference USA East	4	5	6		—	—	—
2006	Conference USA East	2	7	6		Lost PapaJohns.com Bowl vs. South Florida 24–7	—	—
2007	Conference USA East	2	8	5		Won Hawai'i Bowl vs. Boise State 41–38	—	—
2008	Conference USA East	1	9	5		Won C-USA Championship vs. Tulsa 27–24; Lost Liberty Bowl vs Kentucky 19–25	—	—
2009	Conference USA East	1	9	5		Won C-USA Championship vs. Houston 38–32; Lost Liberty Bowl vs Arkansas 17–20	—	—
2010	Conference USA East	2	6	7		Lost Military Bowl vs Maryland 20–51	—	—
2011	Conference USA East	3	5	7		—	—	—
2012	Conference USA East	2	8	5		Lost New Orleans Bowl vs Louisiana–Lafayette 49–34	—	—
2013	Conference USA East	2	10	3		Won Beef 'O' Brady's Bowl vs Ohio 37–20	—	—
2014	American Athletic Conference	4	8	5		Lost Birmingham Bowl vs Florida 28–20	—	—
2015	American Athletic Conference East	5	5	7		—	—	—
2016	American Athletic Conference East	6	3	9		—	—	—
2017	American Athletic Conference East	4	3	9		—	—	—
2018	American Athletic Conference East	5	3	9		—	—	—
2019	American Athletic Conference East	5	4	8		—	—	—
2020	American Athletic Conference	9	3	6		—	—	—
2021	American Athletic Conference	4	7	5		Cancelled Military Bowl vs. Boston College	—	—
2022	American Athletic Conference	6	8	5		Won Birmingham Bowl vs Coastal Carolina 53–29	—	—
2023	American Athletic Conference	14	2	10		—	—	—
2024	American Athletic Conference	5	8	5		Won Military Bowl vs NC State 26–21	—	—
2025	American Athletic Conference	4	9	4		Won Military Bowl vs Pittsburgh 23–17	—	—
Totals			468	446	11	(regular season games only)		
Totals			12	11	0	(bowl games only)		
Totals			480	457	11	(all games)		
