= Jack Boone =

American football player and coach (1918–1984)

- Boone pictured in The Buccaneer 1956, ECU yearbook

Biographical details
- Born: May 28, 1918; Roanoke Rapids, North Carolina, U.S.
- Died: February 6, 1984 (aged 65); Greenville, North Carolina, U.S.

Playing career
- 1938–1941: Elon
- 1942: Cleveland Rams
- Position: Halfback

Coaching career (HC unless noted)

Football
- 1948–1951: East Carolina (assistant)
- 1952–1961: East Carolina

Baseball
- 1951–1953: East Carolina

Head coaching record
- Overall: 49–45–5 (football); 38–23–2 (baseball)
- Bowls: 0–2

Accomplishments and honors

Championships
- Football; 1 North State (1953)

Robert Lee "Jack" Boone (May 28, 1918 – February 6, 1984) was an American football player and coach; most notably he served as head coach for the college football team of East Carolina College (now East Carolina University) for ten years.

== Early years ==
Boone was a native of Portsmouth, Virginia, and attended Elon College, where he played on the football team as a halfback from 1938 to 1941, and was co-captain in his senior year. After his college career, he was signed by the Cleveland Rams in 1942, and played in two games for them. He later served in the US Navy during World War II.

== East Carolina ==
Boone joined the coaching staff of East Carolina in September 1948, as assistant football coach. He was the college baseball coach for three seasons. His teams posted a 38–23–2 record, for a .623 winning percentage.

In 1952, Boone became head football coach for East Carolina, the ninth in the program's history. That year, the Pirates saw their first action in the postseason when they played Clarion State College in the Lions Bowl, but lost 13–6. In 1953, the Pirates became the North State Conference champions and played in the Elks Bowl, where they lost 12–0 to Morris Harvey College. Boone was named the Coach of the Year in the North State Conference, after his team finished 8–2. Boone's football coaching career lasted ten years, during which he compiled a 49–45–5 record. He was dismissed as head coach in November 1961.

== Later years ==
Boone was inducted into the athletic hall of fame of Elon in 1972, and of East Carolina in 1981. He died in February 1984 at Pitt County Memorial Hospital in Greenville, North Carolina.

== Head coaching record ==
=== Football ===
Year	Team	Overall	Conference	Standing	Bowl/playoffs
East Carolina Pirates (North State Conference / Carolinas Conference) (1952–1961)
1952	East Carolina	6–3–2	4–1–1	T–2nd	L Lions
1953	East Carolina	8–2	6–0	1st	L Elks
1954	East Carolina	5–4–1	3–2	3rd	
1955	East Carolina	4–5	3–2	3rd	
1956	East Carolina	2–6–1	2–3	5th	
1957	East Carolina	1–8	0–5	7th	
1958	East Carolina	6–4	4–2	T–2nd	
1959	East Carolina	5–6	3–3	4th	
1960	East Carolina	7–3	4–2	3rd	
1961	East Carolina	5–4–1	4–3	4th	
East Carolina:		49–45–5	33–23–1		
Total:		49–45–5			
National championship Conference title Conference division title or championship game berth
