= E. C. Duggins =

American football coach

- Duggins pictured in The Rhododendron 1953, Appalachian State yearbook

Biographical details
- Born: August 23, 1912; Clinton, Tennessee, U.S.
- Died: October 16, 1960 (aged 48); Nashville, Tennessee, U.S.
- Education: Milligan College (1935)

Coaching career (HC unless noted)
- 1939–1940: Appalachian State (line)
- 1941: Tampa (assistant)
- 1946: Appalachian State (assistant)
- 1947–1950: Appalachian State
- 1952–1955: Appalachian State

Head coaching record
- Overall: 57–25–3
- Bowls: 2–5

Accomplishments and honors

Championships
- 3 North State (1948, 1950, 1954)

Edward Cameron Duggins (August 23, 1912 – October 16, 1960) was an American college football coach. He was the ninth head football coach at Appalachian State Teachers College—now known as Appalachian State University—located in Boone, North Carolina, serving from 1947 to 1950 and again from 1952 to 1955. The Mountaineers compiled a record of 57–25–3, captured three North State Conference titles, and played in seven small college bowl games under Duggins.

== Head coaching record ==
Year	Team	Overall	Conference	Standing	Bowl/playoffs
Appalachian State Mountaineers (North State Conference) (1947–1950)
1947	Appalachian State	9–1	6–1	2nd	
1948	Appalachian State	8–1–1	7–0–1	1st	L Burley Bowl
1949	Appalachian State	9–3	6–2	2nd	W Pythian Bowl
1950	Appalachian State	9–2–1	7–0–1	1st	L Burley Bowl, L Pythian Bowl
Appalachian State Mountaineers (North State Conference) (1952–1955)
1952	Appalachian State	2–6–1	2–4	5th	
1953	Appalachian State	6–4	3–3	5th	
1954	Appalachian State	8–3	6–0	1st	W Burley Bowl, L Elks Bowl
1955	Appalachian State	6–5	3–3	4th	L Burley Bowl
Appalachian State:		57–25–3	40–13–2		
Total:		57–25–3			
National championship Conference title Conference division title or championship game berth

== See also ==
- List of college football head coaches with non-consecutive tenure
