= 1958 East Carolina Pirates football team =

American college football season

1958 East Carolina Pirates football
- Conference: North State Conference
- Record: 6–4 (4–2 NSC)
- Head coach: Jack Boone (7th season)
- Home stadium: College Stadium

1958 North State Conference football standings
	Conf.					Overall
Team	W		L		T	W		L		T
Lenoir Rhyne $	6	–	0	–	0	9	–	1	–	0
Appalachian State	4	–	2	–	0	6	–	4	–	0
East Carolina	4	–	2	–	0	6	–	4	–	0
Catawba	2	–	3	–	1	5	–	3	–	2
Elon	2	–	4	–	0	3	–	6	–	0
Western Carolina	1	–	4	–	1	1	–	8	–	1
Guilford	1	–	5	–	0	3	–	6	–	0
$ – Conference champion

The 1958 East Carolina Pirates football team was an American football team that represented East Carolina College (now known as East Carolina University) as a member of the North State Conference during the 1958 NAIA football season. In their seventh season under head coach Jack Boone, the team compiled a 6–4 record.

== Schedule ==
Date	Opponent	Site	Result	Source
September 13	Emory and Henry*	College Stadium; Greenville, NC	W 12–0	
September 20	Presbyterian*	College Stadium; Greenville, NC	L 16–24	
October 4	Catawba	College Stadium; Greenville, NC	W 6–0	
October 11	at Elon	Burlington Memorial Stadium; Burlington, NC	W 14–6	
October 18	Western Carolina	College Stadium; Greenville, NC	W 18–7	
October 25	at Newberry*	Setzler Field; Newberry, SC	L 6–28	
November 1	at Appalachian State	College Field; Boone, NC	L 0–14	
November 8	at Lenoir Rhyne	Moretz Stadium; Hickory, NC	L 14–59	
November 15	Randolph–Macon*	College Stadium; Greenville, NC	W 36–6	
November 27	Guilford	College Stadium; Greenville, NC	W 20–0	
*Non-conference game
