= Bob Breitenstein =

Bob Breitenstein may refer to:

- Bob Breitenstein (American football coach) (1913–2002), head football coach for the Appalachian State Mountaineers, 1959
- Bob Breitenstein (offensive lineman) (1943–2023), professional American football player
