= 1954 East Tennessee State Buccaneers football team =

American college football season

1954 East Tennessee State Buccaneers football

VSAC champion

Burley Bowl, L 13–28 vs. Appalachian State
- Conference: Volunteer State Athletic Conference
- Record: 5–4–1 (– VSAC)
- Head coach: Hal Littleford (1st season)
- Home stadium: College Stadium

The 1954 East Tennessee State Buccaneers football team was an American football team that represented East Tennessee State College (ETSC), now known as East Tennessee State University, as a member of the Volunteer State Athletic Conference (VSAC) during the 1954 college football season. Led by first-year head coach Hal Littleford, the Buccaneers compiled an overall record of 5–4–1 and as VSAC champion. East Tennessee State lost to Appalachian State in the Burley Bowl by the score of 13–28.

== Schedule ==
| Date | Opponent | Site | Result | Attendance | Source |
|---|---|---|---|---|---|
| September 18 | at Austin Peay | Municipal Stadium; Clarksville, TN | W 28–7 | | |
| September 25 | Western Kentucky* | College Stadium; Johnson City, TN | L 6–24 | 5,000 | |
| October 2 | at Western Carolina* | Memorial Stadium; Cullowhee, NC | W 21–14 | | |
| October 9 | Maryville (TN)^{†} | College Stadium; Johnson City, TN | W 20–14 | 5,000 | |
| October 16 | at Carson–Newman | Burke–Tarr Stadium; Jefferson City, TN | W 20–13 | | |
| October 23 | at East Carolina* | College Stadium; Greenville, NC | T 6–6 | | |
| October 30 | at Tennessee Tech | Overall Field; Cookeville, TN | L 7–21 | | |
| November 13 | Middle Tennessee* | College Stadium; Johnson City, TN | W 30–6 | | |
| November 20 | Florence State* | College Stadium; Johnson City, TN | L 14–27 | 2,000 | |
| November 25 | vs. Appalachian State* | Memorial Stadium; Johnson City, TN (Burley Bowl) | L 13–28 | 6,000 | |
*Non-conference game; ^{†}Homecoming; Source:
