= 1954 East Carolina Pirates football team =

American college football season

1954 East Carolina Pirates football
- Conference: North State Conference
- Record: 5–4–1 (3–2 NSC)
- Head coach: Jack Boone (3rd season)
- Home stadium: College Stadium

1954 North State Conference football standings
	Conf.					Overall
Team	W		L		T	W		L		T
Appalachian State $	6	–	0	–	0	8	–	3	–	0
Elon	4	–	1	–	1	5	–	3	–	1
East Carolina	3	–	2	–	0	5	–	4	–	1
Western Carolina	2	–	2	–	1	4	–	5	–	1
Catawba	2	–	4	–	0	3	–	8	–	0
Guilford	1	–	3	–	0	1	–	7	–	0
Lenoir Rhyne	0	–	6	–	0	2	–	7	–	1
$ – Conference champion

The 1954 East Carolina Pirates football team was an American football team that represented East Carolina College (now known as East Carolina University) as a member of the North State Conference during the 1954 college football season. In their third season under head coach Jack Boone, the team compiled a 5–4–1 record.

== Schedule ==
Date	Opponent	Site	Result	Attendance	Source
September 11	Norfolk NAS*	College Stadium; Greenville, NC	W 21–0		
September 18	West Chester*	College Stadium; Greenville, NC	L 4–6		
September 25	at Lenoir Rhyne	Moretz Stadium; Hickory, NC	W 7–6		
October 2	Catawba	College Stadium; Greenville, NC	W 26–7		
October 9	at Elon	Burlington Memorial Stadium; Burlington, NC	L 6–20		
October 16	Western Carolina^{†}	College Stadium; Greenville, NC	W 27–13	4,500	
October 23	East Tennessee State*	College Stadium; Greenville, NC	T 6–6		
October 30	at Appalachian State	College Field; Boone, NC	L 7–13	3,000	
November 6	at Tampa*	Phillips Field; Tampa, FL	L 14–27		
November 13	Stetson*	College Stadium; Greenville, NC	W 26–7		
*Non-conference game; ^{†}Homecoming
