= 1961 Lenoir Rhyne Bears football team =

American college football season

1961 Lenoir Rhyne Bears football

Carolinas Conference champion
- Conference: Carolinas Conference

Ranking
- AP: No. 9 (AP small college)
- Record: 8–1–1 (6–1 Carolinas)
- Head coach: Clarence Stasavich (16th season)
- Home stadium: Lenoir Rhyne College Field

1961 Carolinas Conference football standings
	Conf.					Overall
Team	W		L		T	W		L		T
No. 15 Lenoir Rhyne $	6	–	1	–	0	8	–	1	–	1
Appalachian State	5	–	1	–	0	7	–	3	–	0
Newberry	4	–	2	–	0	5	–	5	–	1
East Carolina	4	–	3	–	0	5	–	4	–	1
Elon	3	–	4	–	0	4	–	6	–	0
Catawba	3	–	4	–	0	3	–	7	–	0
Western Carolina	2	–	5	–	0	4	–	6	–	0
Guilford	0	–	7	–	0	0	–	9	–	0
$ – Conference champion; Rankings from NAIA poll

The 1961 Lenoir Rhyne Bears football team was an American football team that represented Lenoir Rhyne College (now known as Lenoir–Rhyne University) as a member of the Carolinas Conference during the 1961 college football season. In their 16th season under head coach Clarence Stasavich, the team compiled an 8–1–1 record (6–1 in conference games) and won the Carolinas Conference championship. The Bears were ranked No. 9 in the final Associated Press small college poll. The 1960 team won the NAIA national championship.

Junior fullback Richard Kemp led the conference with 1,050 yards of total offense and 78 points scored, and was selected as the conference's most valuable player.

The team played its home games at Lenoir Rhyne College Field in Hickory, North Carolina.

== Schedule ==
Date	Opponent	Site	Result	Attendance	Source
September 16	Wofford*	Hickory, NC	T 14–14		
September 23	Presbyterian*	Hickory, NC	W 28–8		
September 30	Newberry	Hickory, NC	L 14–18		
October 9	at Appalachian State	American Legion Memorial Stadium; Charlotte, NC	W 19–6	10,025	
October 14	Guilford	Hickory, NC	W 35–6		
October 21	at Western Carolina	Cullowhee, NC	W 24–14		
October 28	at Wittenberg*	Wittenberg Stadium; Springfield, OH	W 34–14	4,900	
November 4	at East Carolina	College Stadium; Greenville, NC	W 24–19		
November 11	Elon	Hickory, NC	W 50–16		
November 23	Catawba	Hickory, NC	W 9–7		
*Non-conference game

== Statistics ==
Fullback Richard Kemp led the Carolinas Conference in total offense (1,050 yards), rushing (785 yards), and scoring (78 points). He also completed 18 of 21 passes for 265 yards.

== Awards and honors ==
Junior fullback Richard Kemp was selected in voting by sportscasters, sports writers and conference coaches as the most valuable player of the Carolinas Conference. He received 33 of 53 first-place votes.

Kemp and end Ronnie Frye were unanimous choices on the 1961 All-Carolinas Conference football team. Tackle Eddie Haupt, center Bill Isaacs, and guards Jim Edmiston and Ron Hardman were also named to the first team. Tackle Al Fusonie and backs Marcus Midgett and Odell White received honorable mention.

Three Lenoir Rhyne players were chosen for the 1961 NAIA All-District 26 football team: end Ronnie Frye, tackle Eddie Haupt, and fullback Richard Kemp.
