= 1961 East Carolina Pirates football team =

American college football season

1961 East Carolina Pirates football
- Conference: Carolinas Conference
- Record: 5–4–1 (4–3 Carolinas)
- Head coach: Jack Boone (10th season)
- Home stadium: College Stadium

1961 Carolinas Conference football standings
	Conf.					Overall
Team	W		L		T	W		L		T
No. 15 Lenoir Rhyne $	6	–	1	–	0	8	–	1	–	1
Appalachian State	5	–	1	–	0	7	–	3	–	0
Newberry	4	–	2	–	0	5	–	5	–	1
East Carolina	4	–	3	–	0	5	–	4	–	1
Elon	3	–	4	–	0	4	–	6	–	0
Catawba	3	–	4	–	0	3	–	7	–	0
Western Carolina	2	–	5	–	0	4	–	6	–	0
Guilford	0	–	7	–	0	0	–	9	–	0
$ – Conference champion; Rankings from NAIA poll

The 1961 East Carolina Pirates football team represented East Carolina College—now known as East Carolina University—during the 1961 college football season.

== Schedule ==
Date	Opponent	Site	Result	Attendance	Source
September 16	Indiana (PA)*	College Stadium; Greenville, NC	W 19–6		
September 23	at Guilford	Greensboro, NC	W 17–15		
September 30	at Catawba	Shuford Stadium; Salisbury, NC	W 16–0		
October 7	Elon	College Stadium; Greenville, NC	W 22–20	10,000	
October 14	Western Carolina	College Stadium; Greenville, NC	L 6–7		
October 21	at Newberry	Setzler Field; Newberry, SC	W 13–7		
October 28	vs. Appalachian State	College Field; Hickory, NC	L 14–16		
November 4	Lenoir Rhyne	College Stadium; Greenville, NC	L 19–24		
November 11	at Furman*	Sirrine Stadium; Greenville, SC	L 8–29	12,000	
November 18	Wofford*	College Stadium; Greenville, NC	T 20–20		
*Non-conference game
