= 1959 Appalachian State Mountaineers football team =

American college football season

1959 Appalachian State Mountaineers football
- Conference: North State Conference
- Record: 6–4 (5–1 NSC)
- Head coach: Bob Breitenstein (1st season)
- Home stadium: College Field

1959 North State Conference football standings
	Conf.					Overall
Team	W		L		T	W		L		T
No. Lenoir Rhyne $^	6	–	0	–	0	10	–	1	–	0
Appalachian State	5	–	1	–	0	6	–	4	–	0
Western Carolina	4	–	2	–	0	7	–	2	–	1
East Carolina	3	–	3	–	0	5	–	6	–	0
Catawba	2	–	4	–	0	2	–	7	–	1
Guilford	1	–	5	–	0	2	–	7	–	0
Elon	0	–	6	–	0	1	–	9	–	0
$ – Conference champion; ^ – NAIA playoff participant; Rankings from NAIA poll

The 1959 Appalachian State Mountaineers football team was an American football team that represented Appalachian State Teachers College (now known as Appalachian State University) as a member of the North State Conference during the 1959 NAIA football season. In their only year under head coach Bob Breitenstein, the Mountaineers compiled an overall record of 6–4, with a mark of 5–1 in conference play, and finished second in the NSC.

== Schedule ==
Date	Opponent	Site	Result	Attendance	Source
September 19	at Emory & Henry*	Municipal Stadium; Bristol, VA	W 21–0		
September 26	Western Carolina	College Field; Boone, NC (rivalry)	W 14–12	4,000	
October 3	at Elon	Burlington Municipal Stadium; Burlington, NC	W 19–8	1,500	
October 10	Lenoir Rhyne	College Field; Boone, NC	L 6–29		
October 17	at Catawba	Shuford Stadium; Salisbury, NC	W 28–0		
October 24	Carson–Newman*^{†}	College Field; Boone, NC	L 22–26	5,000	
October 31	at East Carolina	College Stadium; Greenville, NC	W 28–0		
November 7	at Guilford	Greensboro, NC	W 20–9		
November 14	Presbyterian*	College Field; Boone, NC	L 0–34		
November 21	at Tampa*	Phillips Field; Tampa, FL	L 6–23	4,000	
*Non-conference game; ^{†}Homecoming
