= 1960 East Carolina Pirates football team =

American college football season

1960 East Carolina Pirates football
- Conference: North State Conference
- Record: 7–3 (4–2 NSC)
- Head coach: Jack Boone (9th season)
- Home stadium: College Stadium

1960 North State Conference football standings
	Conf.					Overall
Team	W		L		T	W		L		T
No. 1/2 Lenoir Rhyne $^	6	–	0	–	0	12	–	0	–	0
Appalachian State	5	–	1	–	0	8	–	2	–	0
East Carolina	4	–	2	–	0	7	–	3	–	0
Western Carolina	2	–	4	–	0	6	–	5	–	0
Elon	2	–	4	–	0	4	–	6	–	0
Catawba	2	–	4	–	0	2	–	9	–	0
Guilford	0	–	6	–	0	1	–	8	–	0
$ – Conference champion; ^ – NAIA playoff participant; Rankings from NAIA poll and AP small college poll

The 1960 East Carolina Pirates football team was an American football team that represented East Carolina College (now known as East Carolina University) as a member of the North State Conference during the 1960 NAIA football season. In their ninth season under head coach Jack Boone, the team compiled a 7–3 record.

== Schedule ==
Date	Opponent	Site	Result	Attendance	Source
September 17	at The Apprentice School*	Newport News, VA	W 21–6	2,000	
September 24	Guilford	College Stadium; Greenville, NC	W 7–0		
October 1	Catawba	College Stadium; Greenville, NC	W 28–0		
October 8	at Elon	Burlington Memorial Stadium; Burlington, NC	W 14–8		
October 15	Western Carolina	College Stadium; Greenville, NC	W 7–6		
October 22	Newberry	College Stadium; Greenville, NC	W 21–0	5,000	
October 29	at Appalachian State	College Field; Boone, NC	L 17–21		
November 5	at No. 3 Lenoir Rhyne	Moretz Stadium; Hickory, NC	L 0–17		
November 12	Presbyterian*	College Stadium; Greenville, NC	L 7–27		
November 19	Richmond*	College Stadium; Greenville, NC	W 22–7		
*Non-conference game; Rankings from AP Poll released prior to the game
