= 1953 Appalachian State Mountaineers football team =

American college football season

1953 Appalachian State Mountaineers football
- Conference: North State Conference
- Record: 6–4 (3–3 NSC)
- Head coach: E. C. Duggins (6th season)
- Home stadium: College Field

1953 North State Conference football standings
	Conf.					Overall
Team	W		L		T	W		L		T
East Carolina $	6	–	0	–	0	8	–	2	–	0
Catawba	4	–	1	–	1	4	–	5	–	1
Appalachian State	3	–	3	–	0	6	–	4	–	0
Lenoir Rhyne	3	–	3	–	0	4	–	5	–	0
Guilford	2	–	3	–	0	3	–	5	–	0
Elon	1	–	4	–	1	1	–	6	–	1
Western Carolina	0	–	5	–	0	1	–	9	–	0
$ – Conference champion

The 1953 Appalachian State Mountaineers football team was an American football team that represented Appalachian State Teachers College (now known as Appalachian State University) as a member of the North State Conference during the 1953 college football season. In their fifth year under head coach E. C. Duggins, the Mountaineers compiled an overall record of 6–4, with a mark of 3–3 in conference play, and finished fifth in the NSC.

== Schedule ==
Date	Opponent	Site	Result	Attendance	Source
September 19	vs. Guilford	Bowman Gray Stadium; Winston-Salem, NC	L 12–14		
September 26	Western Carolina	College Field; Boone, NC (rivalry)	W 7–6	2,000	
October 3	at Elon	Burlington Municipal Stadium; Burlington, NC	W 21–19		
October 10	Lenoir Rhyne	College Field; Boone, NC	W 32–6	5,000	
October 17	vs. Catawba	Bowman Gray Stadium; Winston-Salem, NC	L 13–14	3,500	
October 24	Emory & Henry*	College Field; Boone, NC	W 14–6	4,000	
October 31	at East Carolina	College Stadium; Greenville, NC	L 7–40		
November 7	at East Tennessee State*	Memorial Stadium; Johnson City, TN	L 19–21	1,700	
November 13	at Morris Harvey*	Laidley Field; Charleston, WV	W 26–6		
November 21	at Tampa*	Phillips Field; Tampa, FL	W 35–12	5,500	
*Non-conference game
