= 1959 East Carolina Pirates football team =

American college football season

1959 East Carolina Pirates football
- Conference: North State Conference
- Record: 5–6 (3–3 NSC)
- Head coach: Jack Boone (8th season)
- Home stadium: College Stadium

1959 North State Conference football standings
| | Conf. | | | | | Overall |
| Team | W | | L | | T | W | | L | | T |
|---|---|---|---|---|---|---|---|---|---|---|
| No. Lenoir Rhyne $^ | 6 | – | 0 | – | 0 | 10 | – | 1 | – | 0 |
| Appalachian State | 5 | – | 1 | – | 0 | 6 | – | 4 | – | 0 |
| Western Carolina | 4 | – | 2 | – | 0 | 7 | – | 2 | – | 1 |
| East Carolina | 3 | – | 3 | – | 0 | 5 | – | 6 | – | 0 |
| Catawba | 2 | – | 4 | – | 0 | 2 | – | 7 | – | 1 |
| Guilford | 1 | – | 5 | – | 0 | 2 | – | 7 | – | 0 |
| Elon | 0 | – | 6 | – | 0 | 1 | – | 9 | – | 0 |
$ – Conference champion; ^ – NAIA playoff participant; Rankings from NAIA poll

The 1959 East Carolina Pirates football team was an American football team that represented East Carolina College (now known as East Carolina University) as a member of the North State Conference during the 1959 NAIA football season. In their eighth season under head coach Jack Boone, the team compiled a 5–6 record.

== Schedule ==
| Date | Opponent | Site | Result | Source |
|---|---|---|---|---|
| September 12 | at Presbyterian* | Old Bailey Stadium; Clinton, SC | L 13–18 | |
| September 19 | Albright* | College Stadium; Greenville, NC | W 45–0 | |
| September 26 | at Guilford | Greensboro, NC | W 27–0 | |
| October 3 | at Catawba | Shuford Stadium; Salisbury, NC | W 34–7 | |
| October 10 | Elon | College Stadium; Greenville, NC | W 31–8 | |
| October 17 | at Western Carolina | Memorial Stadium; Cullowhee, NC | L 14–34 | |
| October 24 | at Newberry* | Setzler Field; Newberry, SC | L 7–34 | |
| October 31 | Appalachian State | College Stadium; Greenville, NC | L 0–28 | |
| November 7 | Lenoir Rhyne | College Stadium; Greenville, NC | L 21–22 | |
| November 14 | The Apprentice School* | College Stadium; Greenville, NC | W 74–0 | |
| November 21 | at Wofford* | Snyder Field; Spartanburg, SC | L 13–20 | |
*Non-conference game
