= 1960 Appalachian State Mountaineers football team =

American college football season

1960 Appalachian State Mountaineers football
- Conference: North State Conference
- Record: 8–2 (5–1 NSC)
- Head coach: Jim Duncan (1st season)
- Home stadium: College Field

1960 North State Conference football standings
| | Conf. | | | | | Overall |
| Team | W | | L | | T | W | | L | | T |
|---|---|---|---|---|---|---|---|---|---|---|
| No. 1/2 Lenoir Rhyne $^ | 6 | – | 0 | – | 0 | 12 | – | 0 | – | 0 |
| Appalachian State | 5 | – | 1 | – | 0 | 8 | – | 2 | – | 0 |
| East Carolina | 4 | – | 2 | – | 0 | 7 | – | 3 | – | 0 |
| Western Carolina | 2 | – | 4 | – | 0 | 6 | – | 5 | – | 0 |
| Elon | 2 | – | 4 | – | 0 | 4 | – | 6 | – | 0 |
| Catawba | 2 | – | 4 | – | 0 | 2 | – | 9 | – | 0 |
| Guilford | 0 | – | 6 | – | 0 | 1 | – | 8 | – | 0 |
$ – Conference champion; ^ – NAIA playoff participant; Rankings from NAIA poll and AP small college poll

The 1960 Appalachian State Mountaineers football team was an American football team that represented Appalachian State Teachers College (now known as Appalachian State University) as a member of the North State Conference during the 1960 NAIA football season. In their first year under head coach Jim Duncan, the Mountaineers compiled an overall record of 8–2, with a mark of 5–1 in conference play, and finished second in the NSC.

== Schedule ==
| Date | Opponent | Site | Result | Attendance | Source |
|---|---|---|---|---|---|
| September 17 | Emory & Henry* | College Field; Boone, NC | W 7–0 | 4,000 | |
| September 24 | at Western Carolina | Memorial Stadium; Cullowhee, NC (rivalry) | W 22–6 | 3,500 | |
| October 1 | Elon | College Field; Boone, NC | W 33–13 | 5,000 | |
| October 8 | at Lenoir Rhyne | College Field; Hickory, NC | L 8–26 | 6,400 | |
| October 15 | Catawba | College Field; Boone, NC | W 12–7 | 4,000 | |
| October 22 | at Carson–Newman* | Jefferson City, TN | W 6–0 | 3,000 | |
| October 29 | East Carolina | College Field; Boone, NC | W 21–17 | 3,500 | |
| November 5 | Guilford | College Field; Boone, NC | W 13–0 | 2,500 | |
| November 12 | at Wofford* | Snyder Field; Spartanburg, SC | L 14–23 | 3,400 | |
| November 26 | at Tampa* | Phillips Field; Tampa, FL | W 22–15 | 3,500 | |
*Non-conference game
