= 1958 Appalachian State Mountaineers football team =

American college football season

1958 Appalachian State Mountaineers football
- Conference: North State Conference
- Record: 6–4 (4–2 NSC)
- Head coach: Bob Broome (3rd season)
- Home stadium: College Field

1958 North State Conference football standings
	Conf.					Overall
Team	W		L		T	W		L		T
Lenoir Rhyne $	6	–	0	–	0	9	–	1	–	0
Appalachian State	4	–	2	–	0	6	–	4	–	0
East Carolina	4	–	2	–	0	6	–	4	–	0
Catawba	2	–	3	–	1	5	–	3	–	2
Elon	2	–	4	–	0	3	–	6	–	0
Western Carolina	1	–	4	–	1	1	–	8	–	1
Guilford	1	–	5	–	0	3	–	6	–	0
$ – Conference champion

The 1958 Appalachian State Mountaineers football team was an American football team that represented Appalachian State Teachers College (now known as Appalachian State University) as a member of the North State Conference during the 1958 NAIA football season. In their third year under head coach Bob Broome, the Mountaineers compiled an overall record of 6–4, with a mark of 4–2 in conference play, and finished second in the NSC.

== Schedule ==
Date	Opponent	Site	Result	Attendance	Source
September 13	East Tennessee State*	College Field; Boone, NC	W 12–0	3,500	
September 27	at Western Carolina	Memorial Stadium; Cullowhee, NC (rivalry)	L 22–32		
October 4	Elon	College Field; Boone, NC	W 32–20		
October 11	at Lenoir Rhyne	Moretz Stadium; Hickory, NC	L 6–28		
October 18	Catawba	College Field; Boone, NC	W 6–0	8,000	
October 25	at Emory & Henry*	Marion H.S. Stadium; Marion, VA	L 0–7	3,500	
November 1	East Carolina	College Field; Boone, NC	W 14–0		
November 8	Guilford	College Field; Boone, NC	W 13–6		
November 15	at Presbyterian*	Bailey Stadium; Clinton, SC	L 0–42		
November 22	at Tampa*	Bryant Field; Lakeland, FL	W 34–26	4,500	
*Non-conference game
