= 1953 East Carolina Pirates football team =

American college football season

1953 East Carolina Pirates football

NSC champion

Elks Bowl, L 0–12 vs Morris Harvey
- Conference: North State Conference
- Record: 8–2 (6–0 NSC)
- Head coach: Jack Boone (2nd season)
- Home stadium: College Stadium

1953 North State Conference football standings
	Conf.					Overall
Team	W		L		T	W		L		T
East Carolina $	6	–	0	–	0	8	–	2	–	0
Catawba	4	–	1	–	1	4	–	5	–	1
Appalachian State	3	–	3	–	0	6	–	4	–	0
Lenoir Rhyne	3	–	3	–	0	4	–	5	–	0
Guilford	2	–	3	–	0	3	–	5	–	0
Elon	1	–	4	–	1	1	–	6	–	1
Western Carolina	0	–	5	–	0	1	–	9	–	0
$ – Conference champion

The 1953 East Carolina Pirates football team was an American football team that represented East Carolina College (now known as East Carolina University) as a member of the North State Conference during the 1953 college football season. In their second season under head coach Jack Boone, the team compiled a 8–2 record and as conference champions.

== Schedule ==
Date	Opponent	Site	Result	Attendance	Source
September 19	Wilson Teachers (DC)*	College Stadium; Greenville, NC	W 41–0		
September 26	Lenoir Rhyne	College Stadium; Greenville, NC	W 34–0	3,500	
October 3	at Catawba	Shuford Stadium; Salisbury, NC	W 13–6		
October 10	Elon	College Stadium; Greenville, NC	W 45–25		
October 17	at Western Carolina	Memorial Stadium; Cullowhee, NC	W 26–7		
October 24	Guilford	College Stadium; Greenville, NC	W 40–0		
October 31	Appalachian State	College Stadium; Greenville, NC	W 40–7		
November 7	at Tampa*	Phillips Field; Tampa, FL	L 13–18		
November 14	at Stetson*	DeLand Municipal Stadium; DeLand, FL	W 40–6		
January 2, 1954	vs. Morris Harvey*	College Stadium; Greenville, NC (Elks Bowl)	L 0–12	5,500	
*Non-conference game
