= 1960 Lenoir Rhyne Bears football team =

American college football season

1960 Lenoir Rhyne Bears football

NAIA national champion NSC champion

Holiday Bowl, W 15–14 vs. Humboldt State
- Conference: North State Conference

Ranking
- Coaches: No. 3 (UPI small college)
- AP: No. 2 (AP small college)
- Record: 11–0–1 (6–0 NSC)
- Head coach: Clarence Stasavich (15th season)
- Home stadium: Lenoir Rhyne College Field

1960 North State Conference football standings
	Conf.					Overall
Team	W		L		T	W		L		T
No. 1/2 Lenoir Rhyne $^	6	–	0	–	0	12	–	0	–	0
Appalachian State	5	–	1	–	0	8	–	2	–	0
East Carolina	4	–	2	–	0	7	–	3	–	0
Western Carolina	2	–	4	–	0	6	–	5	–	0
Elon	2	–	4	–	0	4	–	6	–	0
Catawba	2	–	4	–	0	2	–	9	–	0
Guilford	0	–	6	–	0	1	–	8	–	0
$ – Conference champion; ^ – NAIA playoff participant; Rankings from NAIA poll and AP small college poll

The 1960 Lenoir Rhyne Bears football team was an American football team represented Lenoir Rhyne College (now known as Lenoir–Rhyne University) as a member of the North State Conference (NSC) during the 1960 NAIA football season. In their 15th season under head coach Clarence Stasavich, the team compiled an 11–0–1 record (6–0 against conference opponents) and won the NSC championship. The Bears were ranked No. 2 in the final Associated Press small college poll and No. 3 in the final UPI small college coaches poll. The small college polls included both NCAA and NAIA programs. Both polls were issued before the team's post-season victories.

On December 3, the Bears played Northern Michigan in the NAIA's Eastern Regional playoff. The game ended in a 20–20 tie. NAIA officials decided to award Lenoir Rhyne the Eastern berth in the Holiday Bowl (then the NAIA national championship game) based on total yards gained by in the playoff game.

In the Holiday Bowl, Lenoir Rhyne defeated Humboldt State, 15–14, to win the NAIA national championship. The Bears trailed, 14-12, late in the game after freshman kicker Marion Kirby missed two extra point tries. With 1:35 remaining in the game, Kirby kicked a game-winning field goal.

The team played its home games at Lenoir Rhyne College Field in Hickory, North Carolina.

== Schedule ==
Date	Opponent	Rank	Site	Result	Attendance	Source
September 17	at Wofford*		Snyder Field; Spartanburg, SC	W 30–6		
September 24	at Presbyterian*		Clinton, SC	W 8–0		
October 1	at Newberry*		Newberry, SC	W 34–12		
October 8	Appalachian State	No. 2	Lenoir Rhyne College Field; Hickory, NC	W 26–8	6,400	
October 15	Guilford	No. 2	Lenoir Rhyne College Field; Hickory, NC	W 21–6		
October 22	Western Carolina	No. 1	Lenoir Rhyne College Field; Hickory, NC	W 31–6		
October 29	Georgetown (KY)*	No. 2	Lenoir Rhyne College Field; Hickory, NC	W 63–14		
November 5	East Carolina	No. 3	Lenoir Rhyne College Field; Hickory, NC	W 17–0		
November 12	at Elon	No. 2	Burlington, NC	W 14–0		
November 24	at Catawba	No. 2	Shuford Field; Salisbury, NC	W 56–6	5,500	
December 3	Northern Michigan*	No. 2	Lenoir Rhyne College Field; Hickory, NC (NAIA semifinal)	T 20–20	6,500	
December 10	vs. No. 3 Humboldt State*	No. 2	Stewart Field; St. Petersburg, FL (NAIA championship game—Holiday Bowl)	W 15–14	7,000	
*Non-conference game; Rankings from AP Poll released prior to the game

== Honors and awards ==
The team was led on offense by tailback Lee Farmer. He was selected as the NSC's most valuable player for the second consecutive season. Farmer scored both of Lenoir Rhyne's touchdowns in the Holiday Bowl and was named the game's most valuable player.

Coach Stasavich finished second in the balloting (behind New Mexico State's Warren Woodson) for small college coach of the year.
