= Ken Cooper (American football guard) =

American football player and coach (1923–1997)

No. 33
- Position: Guard

Personal information
- Born: February 26, 1923; Rogersville, Alabama, U.S.
- Died: November 2, 1997 (aged 74); Bexar County, Texas, U.S.
- Listed height: 6 ft 1 in (1.85 m)
- Listed weight: 205 lb (93 kg)

Career information
- High school: Lauderdale County (Rogersville)
- College: Vanderbilt (1942, 1946–1948)
- NFL draft: 1949: 15th round, 143rd overall pick

Career history

Playing
- Baltimore Colts (1949–1950)

Coaching
- Austin Peay (1951–1954) Assistant; Austin Peay (1955–1957) Head coach

Awards and highlights
- Second-team All-SEC (1948)

Career NFL/AAFC statistics
- Games played: 24
- Games started: 12
- Stats at Pro Football Reference

Head coaching record
- Regular season: 11–19–1 (.371)

Kenneth Rousseau Cooper (February 26, 1923 – November 2, 1997) was an American football player and coach. He played professionally as a guard for two seasons with the Baltimore Colts of the All-America Football Conference (AAFC) and the National Football League (NFL). Cooper served as the head football coach at Austin Peay State College—now known as Austin Peay State University—in Clarksville, Tennessee from 1955 to 1957, compiling a record of 11–19–1.

== Head coaching record ==
Year	Team	Overall	Conference	Standing	Bowl/playoffs
Austin Peay Governors (Volunteer State Athletic Conference) (1955–1957)
1955	Austin Peay	2–7–1			
1956	Austin Peay	5–6			
1957	Austin Peay	4–6			
Austin Peay:		11–19–1			
Total:		11–19–1			
