= 1954 Appalachian State Mountaineers football team =

American college football season

1954 Appalachian State Mountaineers football

NSC champion Burley Bowl champion

Burley Bowl, W 28–13 vs. East Tennessee State Elks Bowl, L 13–20 vs. Newberry
- Conference: North State Conference
- Record: 8–3 (6–0 NSC)
- Head coach: E. C. Duggins (7th season)
- Home stadium: College Field

1954 North State Conference football standings
	Conf.					Overall
Team	W		L		T	W		L		T
Appalachian State $	6	–	0	–	0	8	–	3	–	0
Elon	4	–	1	–	1	5	–	3	–	1
East Carolina	3	–	2	–	0	5	–	4	–	1
Western Carolina	2	–	2	–	1	4	–	5	–	1
Catawba	2	–	4	–	0	3	–	8	–	0
Guilford	1	–	3	–	0	1	–	7	–	0
Lenoir Rhyne	0	–	6	–	0	2	–	7	–	1
$ – Conference champion

The 1954 Appalachian State Mountaineers football team was an American football team that represented Appalachian State Teachers College (now known as Appalachian State University) as a member of the North State Conference during the 1954 college football season. In their seventh year under head coach E. C. Duggins, the Mountaineers compiled an overall record of 8–3, with a mark of 6–0 in conference play, and finished as NSC champion. State concluded their season with a victory over East Tennessee State at the Burley Bowl and a loss against Newberry at the Elks Bowl.

== Schedule ==
Date	Opponent	Site	Result	Attendance	Source
September 18	vs. Guilford	Bowman Gray Stadium; Winston-Salem, NC	W 19–6	4,000	
September 25	vs. Western Carolina	Memorial Stadium; Asheville, NC (rivalry)	W 27–7		
October 2	Elon	College Field; Boone, NC	W 20–6		
October 9	at Lenoir Rhyne	Moretz Stadium; Hickory, NC	W 21–14	8,000	
October 16	Catawba	College Field; Boone, NC	W 27–13	2,500	
October 23	at Emory and Henry*	Bristol Municipal Stadium; Bristol, TN	W 21–0		
October 30	East Carolina	College Field; Boone, NC	W 13–7	3,000	
November 13	Presbyterian*	College Field; Boone, NC	L 7–14	4,000	
November 20	at Tampa*	Phillips Field; Tampa, FL	L 20–25	8,500	
November 25	vs. East Tennessee State*	Memorial Stadium; Johnson City, TN (Burley Bowl)	W 28–13	6,000	
December 11	vs. Newberry*	Riddick Stadium; Raleigh, NC (Elks Bowl)	L 13–20	400	
*Non-conference game
