= 1952 East Carolina Pirates football team =

American college football season

1952 East Carolina Pirates football

Lions Bowl, L 6–13 vs. Clarion
- Conference: North State Conference
- Record: 6–3–2 (4–1–1 NSC)
- Head coach: Jack Boone (1st season)
- Home stadium: College Stadium

1952 North State Conference football standings
	Conf.					Overall
Team	W		L		T	W		L		T
Lenoir Rhyne $	6	–	0	–	0	8	–	1	–	0
East Carolina	4	–	1	–	1	6	–	3	–	2
Catawba	4	–	1	–	1	4	–	5	–	1
Appalachian State	2	–	4	–	0	2	–	6	–	1
Western Carolina	1	–	4	–	0	2	–	8	–	0
Guilford	1	–	4	–	0	1	–	7	–	0
Elon	1	–	5	–	0	3	–	6	–	1
$ – Conference champion

The 1952 East Carolina Pirates football team was an American football team that represented East Carolina College (now known as East Carolina University) as a member of the North State Conference during the 1952 college football season. In their first season under head coach Jack Boone, the team compiled a 6–3–2 record.

== Schedule ==
Date	Opponent	Site	Result	Attendance	Source
September 13	Norfolk NAS*	College Stadium; Greenville, NC	L 7–13	7,500	
September 20	The Apprentice School*	College Stadium; Greenville, NC	W 37–6		
September 27	at Lenoir Rhyne	Moretz Stadium; Hickory, NC	L 6–7	7,500	
October 4	Catawba	College Stadium; Greenville, NC	T 7–7		
October 11	at Elon	Burlington Memorial Stadium; Burlington, NC	W 25–9	2,500	
October 18	Western Carolina	College Stadium; Greenville, NC	W 21–7		
October 25	at Guilford	Greensboro Senior H.S. Stadium; Greensboro, NC	W 41–25		
November 1	at Appalachian State	College Field; Boone, NC	W 22–19	5,000	
November 8	at Stetson*	DeLand Municipal Stadium; DeLand, FL	T 19–19	5,000	
November 15	West Virginia Tech*	College Stadium; Greenville, NC	W 34–7	6,500	
December 13	vs. Clarion*	Shuford Stadium; Salisbury, NC (Lions Bowl)	L 6–13	2,700	
*Non-conference game
