= Hal Littleford =

American football player, coach, and politician (1924–2016)

Biographical details
- Born: 1924; Bristol, Tennessee, U.S.
- Died: March 27, 2016 (aged 91–92); Johnson City, Tennessee, U.S.

Playing career

Football
- 1946–1949: Tennessee

Baseball
- 1947–1950: Tennessee
- Position: Halfback (football)

Coaching career (HC unless noted)

Football
- 1951–1953: East Tennessee State (assistant)
- 1954: East Tennessee State

Head coaching record
- Overall: 5–4–1
- Bowls: 1–0

Accomplishments and honors

Awards
- Second-team All-SEC (1948)

Hal Gordon Littleford Jr. (1924 – March 27, 2016) was an American football player, coach, and politician. He was an all–Southeastern Conference (SEC) halfback at the University of Tennessee in 1948. Littleford served as the head football coach at East Tennessee State University in 1954 after three years there as an assistant. After retiring from coaching, he worked in real estate and served as the mayor of Johnson City, Tennessee, from 1967 to 1969.

== Head coaching record ==
Year	Team	Overall	Conference	Standing	Bowl/playoffs
East Tennessee State (Volunteer State Athletic Conference) (1954)
1954	East Tennessee State	5–4–1			L Burley
East Tennessee State:		5–4–1			
Total:		5–4–1			
