= 1952 Appalachian State Mountaineers football team =

American college football season

1952 Appalachian State Mountaineers football
- Conference: North State Conference
- Record: 2–6–1 (2–4 NSC)
- Head coach: E. C. Duggins (5th season)
- Home stadium: College Field

1952 North State Conference football standings
	Conf.					Overall
Team	W		L		T	W		L		T
Lenoir Rhyne $	6	–	0	–	0	8	–	1	–	0
East Carolina	4	–	1	–	1	6	–	3	–	2
Catawba	4	–	1	–	1	4	–	5	–	1
Appalachian State	2	–	4	–	0	2	–	6	–	1
Western Carolina	1	–	4	–	0	2	–	8	–	0
Guilford	1	–	4	–	0	1	–	7	–	0
Elon	1	–	5	–	0	3	–	6	–	1
$ – Conference champion

The 1952 Appalachian State Mountaineers football team was an American football team that represented Appalachian State Teachers College (now known as Appalachian State University) as a member of the North State Conference during the 1952 college football season. In their fifth year under head coach E. C. Duggins, the Mountaineers compiled an overall record of 2–6–1, with a mark of 2–4 in conference play, and finished fifth in the NSC.

== Schedule ==
Date	Opponent	Site	Result	Attendance	Source
September 20	vs. Guilford	Bowman Gray Stadium; Winston-Salem, NC	W 13–12		
September 27	vs. Western Carolina	Memorial Stadium; Asheville, NC (rivalry)	W 20–12	5,000	
October 4	Elon	College Field; Boone, NC	L 7–13		
October 11	at Lenoir Rhyne	Moretz Stadium; Hickory, NC	L 12–14		
October 18	vs. Catawba	Bowman Gray Stadium; Winston-Salem, NC	L 0–3		
October 25	East Tennessee State*	College Field; Boone, NC	T 27–27		
November 1	East Carolina^{†}	College Field; Boone, NC	L 19–22	5,000	
November 8	at Tampa*	Phillips Field; Tampa, FL	L 0–19	7,500	
November 15	Morris Harvey*	College Field; Boone, NC	L 13–34	2,000	
*Non-conference game; ^{†}Homecoming
