= 1961 Appalachian State Mountaineers football team =

American college football season

1961 Appalachian State Mountaineers football
- Conference: Carolinas Conference
- Record: 7–3 (5–1 Carolinas)
- Head coach: Jim Duncan (2nd season)
- Home stadium: College Field

1961 Carolinas Conference football standings
	Conf.					Overall
Team	W		L		T	W		L		T
No. 15 Lenoir Rhyne $	6	–	1	–	0	8	–	1	–	1
Appalachian State	5	–	1	–	0	7	–	3	–	0
Newberry	4	–	2	–	0	5	–	5	–	1
East Carolina	4	–	3	–	0	5	–	4	–	1
Elon	3	–	4	–	0	4	–	6	–	0
Catawba	3	–	4	–	0	3	–	7	–	0
Western Carolina	2	–	5	–	0	4	–	6	–	0
Guilford	0	–	7	–	0	0	–	9	–	0
$ – Conference champion; Rankings from NAIA poll

The 1961 Appalachian State Mountaineers football team was an American football team that represented Appalachian State Teachers College (now known as Appalachian State University) as a member of the Carolinas Conference during the 1961 college football season. In their second year under head coach Jim Duncan, the Mountaineers compiled an overall record of 7–3, with a mark of 5–1 in conference play, and finished second in the Carolinas Conference.

== Schedule ==
Date	Opponent	Site	Result	Attendance	Source
September 16	at Emory & Henry*	Municipal Stadium; Bristol, VA	W 22–6	3,500	
September 23	vs. Western Carolina	Memorial Stadium; Asheville, NC (rivalry)	W 25–12	5,000	
September 30	at Elon	Burlington Municipal Stadium; Burlington, NC	W 23–0	2,000	
October 9	vs. Lenoir Rhyne	American Legion Memorial Stadium; Charlotte, NC	L 6–19	10,025	
October 14	at Catawba	Shuford Stadium; Salisbury, NC	W 13–0	2,500	
October 21	vs. Carson–Newman*	Lenoir, NC	W 22–7	4,500	
October 28	vs. East Carolina	College Field; Hickory, NC	W 16–14	4,000	
November 4	at Guilford	Greensboro, NC	W 22–0	1,000	
November 11	at Presbyterian*	Bailey Stadium; Clinton, SC	L 7–21	2,000	
November 18	at Tampa*	Phillips Field; Tampa, FL	L 0–14	8,500–10,000	
*Non-conference game
