= 1948 All-SEC football team =

American college football all-star team

The 1948 All-SEC football team consists of American football players selected to the All-Southeastern Conference (SEC) chosen by various selectors for the 1948 college football season. Georgia won the conference.

== All-SEC selections ==
=== Ends ===
- Barney Poole, Ole Miss (AP-1, UP-1)
- George Brodnax, Georgia Tech (AP-1, UP-2)
- Jim Powell, Tennessee (AP-2, UP-1)
- Abner Wimberly, LSU (AP-2)
- Rebel Steiner, Alabama (UP-2)
- Wallace Jones, Kentucky (AP-3)
- Richard Sheffield, Tulane (AP-3)

=== Tackles ===
- Norman Meseroll, Tennessee (AP-1, UP-1)
- Paul Lea, Tulane (AP-1, UP-2)
- Porter Payne, Georgia (AP-2, UP-1)
- Bob Gain, Kentucky (AP-2)
- Carl Copp, Vanderbilt (UP-2)
- Wayne Cantrell, Vanderbilt (AP-3)
- William Matthews, Georgia Tech (AP-3)

=== Guards ===
- Bill Healy, Georgia Tech (AP-1, UP-1)
- Jimmy Crawford, Ole Miss (AP-1, UP-1)
- Ken Cooper, Vanderbilt (AP-2)
- Dennis Doyle, Tulane (AP-2)
- Bernie Reid, Georgia (UP-2)
- Wren Worley, LSU (UP-2)
- Homer Hobbs, Georgia (AP-3)
- James Vugrin, Tennessee (AP-3)

=== Centers ===
- John Clark, Vanderbilt (AP-1, UP-2)
- Jimmy Kynes, Florida (UP-1)
- Hal Herring, Auburn (AP-2)
- Ed Claunch, LSU (AP-3)

=== Quarterbacks ===
- John Rauch, Georgia (College Football Hall of Fame) (AP-1, UP-1)
- Farley Salmon, Ole Miss (AP-2, UP-2)

=== Halfbacks ===
- Chuck Hunsinger, Florida (AP-1, UP-1)
- Shorty McWilliams, Miss. St. (AP-1, UP-2)
- Joe Geri, Georgia (AP-3, UP-1)
- Herb Rich, Vanderbilt (AP-2)
- Hal Littleford, Tennessee (AP-2)
- Harper Davis, Miss. St. (AP-3)
- Billy Cadenhead, Alabama (AP-3)
- Bob McCoy, Georgia Tech (AP-3)

=== Fullbacks ===
- Eddie Price, Tulane (College Football Hall of Fame) (AP-1, UP-1)
- Frank Ziegler, Georgia Tech (AP-2, UP-2)

== Key ==
AP = Associated Press.

UP = United Press

Bold = Consensus first-team selection by both AP and UP

== See also ==
- 1948 College Football All-America Team
