= Bob Breitenstein (American football coach) =

American football player and coach (1913–2002)

- Breitenstein pictured in The Rhododendron 1962, Appalachian State yearbook

Biographical details
- Born: July 24, 1913; Cincinnati, Ohio, U.S.
- Died: March 28, 2002 (aged 88); Boone, North Carolina, U.S.

Playing career
- 1935–1936: Miami (OH)
- Position(s): Halfback

Coaching career (HC unless noted)
- 1946–1948: Shaker Heights HS (OH)
- 1949–1955: Miami (FL) (backfield)
- 1957–1958: Appalachian State (assistant)
- 1959: Appalachian State
- 1960–1963: Appalachian State (assistant)

Head coaching record
- Overall: 6–4 (college)

Robert Logan Breitenstein (July 24, 1913 – March 28, 2002) was an American football player and coach. He served as the head football coach at Appalachian State Teachers College—now known as Appalachian State University—for one season in 1959, compiling a record of 6–4.

Breitenstein was a native of Cincinnati, Ohio. He attended Miami University in Oxford, Ohio, where he played college football as a halfback. Breitenstein coached high school football at Shaker Heights High School in Shaker Heights, Ohio. He resigned as head football coach there in 1949 to take a job as backfield coach under Andy Gustafson at the University of Miami in Coral Gables, Florida. In Miami, he coached quarterback George Mira and fullback Don Bosseler. Breitenstein died in 2002.

== Head coaching record ==
=== College ===
Year	Team	Overall	Conference	Standing	Bowl/playoffs
Appalachian State Mountaineers (North State Conference) (1959)
1959	Appalachian State	6–4	5–1	2nd	
Appalachian State:		6–4	5–1		
Total:		6–4			
