= Elks Bowl =

The Elks Bowl was a postseason college football bowl game played after the 1953 and 1954 regular seasons. There was also an earlier playing of the game, at the junior varsity level, in 1952. Each game was held at a different venue in North Carolina. The bowl's name came from the Benevolent and Protective Order of Elks, a fraternal order, with proceeds from the game going to their charitable works. Like some other postseason match-ups of the era, such as the Grape Bowl, Glass Bowl, and Optimist Bowl, results are listed in NCAA records, but the games were not considered NCAA-sanctioned bowls.

== Game results ==
Season	Date	Winner		Loser		Venue	Attendance	References
1952	October 24, 1952	North Carolina†	13	Wake Forest†	7	Memorial Stadium – Burlington, North Carolina	1,600	
1953	January 2, 1954	Morris Harvey	12	East Carolina	0	College Stadium – Greenville, North Carolina	4,500–5,500	
1954	December 11, 1954	Newberry	20	Appalachian State	13	Riddick Stadium – Raleigh, North Carolina	400	

† The 1952 game was played between junior varsity teams.

== Notes ==
- Morris Harvey halfback Jimmy Carr was selected as most valuable player of the January 1954 game.
- For the December 1954 game, Wofford had been invited to face Appalachian State, but were unable to accept due to other commitments; Newberry was then invited and accepted.

== See also ==
- List of college bowl games
