= Pythian Bowl =

Postseason college football bowl game

The Pythian Bowl was a postseason college football bowl game played from 1949 through 1951. In 1952, the game was played under the name of Lions Bowl. The game was played each year in December in Salisbury, North Carolina, at Shuford Stadium on the grounds of Catawba College. The bowl's original name came from the Knights of Pythias, a fraternal organization, with proceeds from the game going to a local orphanage. The 1952 game was named after Lions Clubs International, with game proceeds again being used for charitable works. Like some other postseason match-ups of the era, such as the Grape Bowl, Glass Bowl, and Optimist Bowl, results are listed in NCAA records, but the games were not considered NCAA-sanctioned bowls.

== Game results ==
| Season | Bowl Name | Date | Winner | | Loser | | Attendance | References |
|---|---|---|---|---|---|---|---|---|
| 1949 | Pythian Bowl | December 10, 1949 | Appalachian State | 21 | Catawba | 7 | 2,000 | |
| 1950 | Pythian Bowl | December 9, 1950 | West Liberty | 28 | Appalachian State | 26 | 4,500 | |
| 1951 | Pythian Bowl | December 8, 1951 | Lenoir Rhyne | 13 | California (PA) | 7 | 4,500 | |
| 1952 | Lions Bowl | December 13, 1952 | Clarion | 13 | East Carolina | 6 | 2,700 | |

== Notes ==
- NCAA records list the date of the first Pythian Bowl as "11-26-1949", which is inconsistent with contemporary newspaper reports.
- The 1949 game was listed as the "Olympian Bowl" in some newspapers.
- For the 1952 game, West Chester had been invited and accepted, however the school later withdrew its acceptance due to the bowl not being sanctioned by the NCAA; Clarion was then invited and replaced West Chester.

== See also ==
- List of college bowl games
