= East Carolina Pirates football =

College football team

2026 East Carolina Pirates football team
- First season: 1932; 94 years ago
- Athletic director: Jon Gilbert
- Head coach: Blake Harrell; 3rd season, 16–7 (.696)
- Location: Greenville, North Carolina
- Stadium: Dowdy–Ficklen Stadium (capacity: 51,000)
- Field: Bagwell Field
- NCAA division: Division I FBS
- Conference: American
- Colors: Purple and gold
- All-time record: 477–463–12 (.507)
- Bowl record: 12–11 (.522)

Conference championships
- NSC: 1953 SoCon: 1966, 1972, 1973, 1976 C-USA: 2008, 2009

Division championships
- C-USA East: 2008, 2009, 2012
- Consensus All-Americans: 3
- Rivalries: Marshall (rivalry); NC State (rivalry); UCF

Uniforms
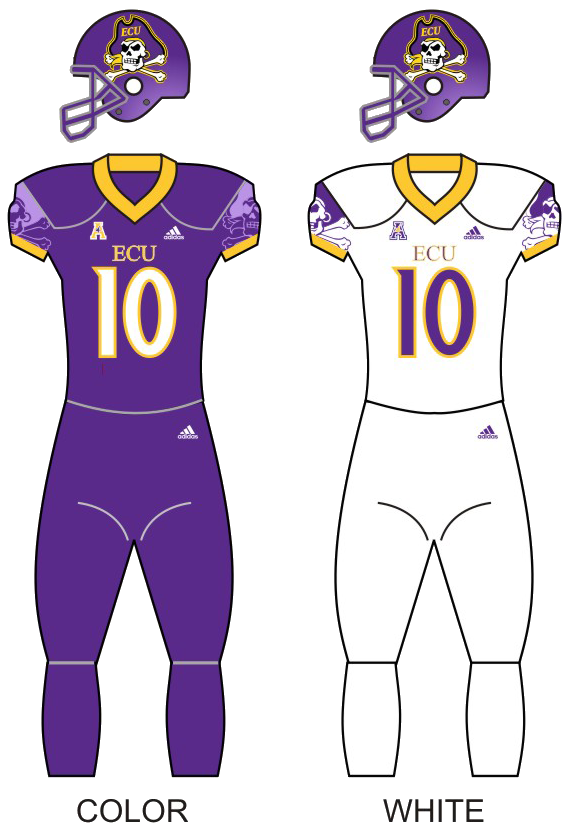
- Fight song: E.C. Victory
- Mascot: PeeDee the Pirate
- Marching band: The Marching Pirates
- Outfitter: Adidas
- Website: ecupirates.com

The East Carolina Pirates are a college football team that represents East Carolina University (variously "East Carolina" or "ECU"). The team is a member of the American Conference, which is in Division I Football Bowl Subdivision (formerly Division I-A) of the National Collegiate Athletic Association (NCAA). Blake Harrell is the head coach.

The Pirates have won seven conference championships and eleven bowl games. The Pirates have 20 All-Americans over their history. Four players have their jerseys retired. Numerous Pirates have played in the NFL, including ten current players.

The team played its inaugural season in 1932. The team played home games at College Stadium on the main campus from the 1949 to the 1962 season. With the exception of the 1999 Miami football game, they have played their home games at Dowdy–Ficklen Stadium every year since 1963. The stadium is located south of East Carolina's main campus near the intersection of South Charles Boulevard and 14th Street. Dowdy-Ficklen underwent an expansion in 2010, raising the capacity of the stadium to 50,000. The Pirates announced a $55 million renovation project to Dowdy-Ficklen in 2016, which added a new tower above the south side stands, among other things.

The coaches and administrative support is located in the Ward Sports Medicine Building, which is located adjacent to the stadium. Strength and conditioning for the players occurs in the Murphy Center, a $13 million indoor training facility which was completed in June 2002 and which is located in the west end zone of Dowdy–Ficklen Stadium. The Pirates also practice and train at the Cliff Moore Practice Facility, which was fully renovated in 2005 and which has two full-length NFL-caliber fields.

== History ==
=== Early history (1932–1973) ===
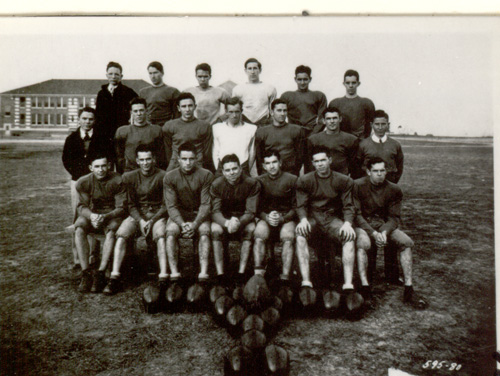
1933 East Carolina football team

East Carolina began organized football in the fall of 1932. The first football coach in school history was Kenneth Beatty. They played under the nickname Teachers because the school was a teacher training school. The team played five games, with two in Greenville. They however did not score a point the whole season, while opponents scored a combined 187 points. The 1933 season started just as they left the 1932 season. The team lost the first four games not scoring a point. The first victory in school history came against Campbell on November 11, 1933. The final score was 6–0. The 1933 team lost their final game against Appalachian St. 14–0. Coach Beatty left after the season. G.L. "Doc" Mathis was appointed the head coach after Coach Beatty left. Before the season, the school decided to change their nickname. The Men's Athletic Association wanted a nickname to inspire "more spirit and enthusiasm." The name was changed from the Teachers to the present Pirates. His first year, the team lost four games. But, they did win against Presbyterian Junior College and tied Old Dominion. The 1935 season included three wins, which was the largest total so far in history. Coach Mathis left after the season.

Bo Farley was introduced as the third head coach. The 1936 season was the first winning season in school history. Coach Farley's team won against Old Dominion, Duke Junior Varsity and Louisburg. He only stayed for one season. J. D. Alexander began coaching in the 1937 season. He had been the head coach at Lincoln Memorial in Tennessee. The season started off badly, losing the first five games, but the team finished on a high note, beating both High Point and Louisburg to finish out the season. The one win in the 1938 season came against Western Carolina. The 1938 team also tied against Guilford. O. A. Hankner coached for only one season at East Carolina. His team managed only 18 points and lost every game. The team had numerous injuries that prevented the team from winning a game. After the disastrous 1939 season, John Christenbury was tapped as the new head coach. His 1940 team had the first winning season since the 1936 season. The team won the first four games, and lost to North Carolina St. Freshmen and High Point. The only undefeated season happened in the 1941 season. The team scored 159 points compared to allowing 20. East Carolina did not field any athletics from 1942 to 1945 because of World War II. Coach Christenbury was killed in an explosion at Port Chicago, California on July 1, 1944. Replacing him at coach was Jim Johnson. Coach Johnson was a 16 letterman while at East Carolina. He was brought in to revitalize the athletic program that was on hiatus because of World War II. His football team went 5–3–1 in 1946. The 1947 season brought East Carolina into the North State Conference, their first conference affiliation. In the first year of conference play, the team had three wins compared to six losses. The next year was even more disastrous; as his team did not win once. Coach Johnson left after the 1948 season.

Bill Dole became the Pirates eighth coach after Coach Johnson left. His teams went 4–5–1 in 1949. That made the third consecutive losing year for East Carolina. The 1950 season turned out better. The team tied the number of wins from the past three years with seven. Coach Dole's last year with the Pirates was in 1951. It was another losing season 4–6. Coach Dole left East Carolina and became the head coach at Davidson. Jack Boone stepped in as the new head coach after Coach Dole left. During his first year, he guided the Pirates to a 1952 regular season record of 6–2–2, and the team was invited to the Lions Bowl, their first bowl game ever. The Pirates came up short against Clarion College, losing 13–6. Coach Boone led the school to another first the next season, as the football team won the North State Conference championship. During the 1953 regular season, the team won eight while losing one en route to this championship. For the second time ever, East Carolina went to a bowl game. The team competed in the Elks Bowl, against Morris Harvey College, losing 12–0. The 1954 season would be the last winning season for four years. Over the four-year span the team won 12, losing 23 and tying twice. Coach Boone stayed at East Carolina for four more years, finally leaving after the 1961 season. He, at the time, was the longest tenured coach. He helped usher the Pirates into a conference and post-season play.

The tenth head coach for the Pirates was Clarence Stasavich. He came to East Carolina after 16 years at Lenoir-Rhyne College. His team went 5–4 his first year. The Pirates went to their first bowl game in nine years in 1963. The team went 9–1 and was invited to the Eastern Bowl. They beat Northeastern, 27–6 in their first ever bowl win. The next two years, the team again went 9–1 and was invited to the Tangerine Bowl. They won both games against Massachusetts, 14–13, in 1964 and Maine, 31–0 in 1965. Also in 1964, Coach Stasavich was named the NAIA Coach of the Year. The 1965 season also marked entering their first conference, the Southern Conference, since the North State/Carolinas Conference. Despite going 4–5–1, Coach Stasavich guided the Pirates to their first conference championship in 13 years. Even though East Carolina won eight games in 1967, they were not invited to a bowl game. The last two seasons for Coach Stasavich were losing seasons. The teams went 4–6 and 2–7. Stasavich departed East Carolina with a 50–27–1 record and was the winningest head coach in ECU football history until Steve Logan surpassed him in 1999.

Mike McGee coached at East Carolina for only the 1970 season. He compiled a 3–8 record. His team recorded wins over Furman, Marshall and Davidson. The victory over Marshall was the final football game for the 75 Marshall players, coaches, and administrators that departed on Southern Airways Flight 932 for Huntington as their plane crashed, leaving no survivors. This tragedy is memorialized in the movie We Are Marshall, and a plaque memorializing the victims is located outside the visitors' locker room at Dowdy–Ficklen Stadium. McGee left for the 1971 season to become head coach at his alma mater, Duke. The 1970 season would also mark the first game in the ECU-NC State series. He was enshrined in the College Football Hall of Fame in 1990. Former NFL wide receiver Sonny Randle, an assistant coach in 1970, was tapped to take over as head coach after McGee left. His first season only saw four victories. But one victory came over instate rival, North Carolina State. The 1972 season accumulated the most wins in a season for the Pirates, since the 1965 season. The team won the Southern Conference Championship, which was the first time since the 1966 season. The only two losses of the season came against North Carolina State and North Carolina. The 1973 season was much like the 1972 season. The team again won nine games, while only losing to North Carolina State and North Carolina. They also won the conference championship. After the 1973 season, Randle left to become the head coach at his alma mater, Virginia. His record at ECU was 22–10.

=== Pat Dye era (1974–1979) ===
East Carolina brought in Alabama linebackers coach Pat Dye as their new head coach in 1974. In his first season, the Pirates won seven games, while losing four. The next year, Coach Dye won even more games. The team started the season with opening losses to North Carolina State and Appalachian State. On October 24, 1975, longtime coach and administrator, Clarence Stasavich died. This was one day before the Pirates beat the UNC Tar Heels for the first time ever, 38–17, with Coach Dye preemptively ending the game and taunting the Tar Heels by downing the ball just yards from goal line late in the game. Two games later, on November 8, East Carolina and Dye faced former ECU coach Sonny Randle, who commented on leaving to the ACC program, that the difference between the Virginia program and the ECU program "was like comparing Apples and Oranges." ECU pelted Virginia 61-10 as ECU fans, including then Chancellor Leo Warren Jenkins, threw tons of apples and oranges onto the field late in the fourth quarter and chanted "We Can Handle, Sonny Randle".

Coach Dye brought the team to the nine win plateau again in 1976. His team also became Southern Conference Champions for the first time under his tenure. It would also be the last time the Pirates ever would become Southern Conference champions. East Carolina left the conference after the 1976 season. The team again became independent. The team had a winning season in 1977. The Pirates won its opener again NC State, 28–23. The next game it went to Durham to play Duke. Former Pirates coach Mike McGee was still the coach. East Carolina beat the Blue Devils 17–16. The team went on to win eight, while losing three for the season. East Carolina began the 1978 season under the new Division I-A moniker. Coach Dye guided the Pirates to an 8–3 record after the season. The team only lost to instate rivals North Carolina and North Carolina State, and Southern Mississippi. With the winning mark, ECU went to their first bowl game in 13 years. They beat Louisiana Tech in the Independence Bowl, 35–13. The 1979 season would be the last for Coach Dye at East Carolina. The team again had a winning season, 7–3–1, but was not invited to a bowl game. He left to serve as head coach at Wyoming for a season, before moving again to Auburn. Dye left ECU after compiling a 48–18–1 record.

=== Ed Emory era (1980–1984) ===
Georgia Tech defensive line coach and recruiting coordinator Ed Emory, an ECU alum, became the Pirates fourteenth head coach. His first two years were lackluster, going 4–7 and 5–6. After a 7-4 campaign in 1982, Emory lead East Carolina to a Pirate first in the 1983 season. That team went 8–3, losing only to Florida State, Florida and Miami. The Pirates lost by a combined 13 points in those three losses. The team was ranked number 20 in the final AP Poll, the first time East Carolina finished ranked in the polls. The next season the team won two games while losing nine. Coach Emory was fired after the season. He left with a 26–29 record.

=== Art Baker era (1985–1988) ===
Florida State quarterbacks coach Art Baker, a former ECU assistant, became the next head coach. He had been the head coach at Furman and The Citadel. Coach Baker led the Pirates to records of 2–9 in 1985, 2–9 in 1986, 5–6 in 1987 and 3–8 in 1988. Baker never had a winning record as head coach at East Carolina. His teams went 12–32 over four years and he was fired after the 1988 season.

=== Bill Lewis era (1989–1991) ===
East Carolina tapped Georgia defensive coordinator and former Wyoming head coach Bill Lewis as Baker's replacement. His first year, Coach Lewis won six games, including wins over Cincinnati and Virginia Tech. This was the first winning season for the Pirates since the 1983 season. The 1990 season was mediocre for the football team, going 5–6. The best winning season for East Carolina occurred in the 1991 season. After losing the opening game to Illinois, 31–38, the Pirates won every other game. Notable wins were South Carolina, Syracuse, Pittsburgh and Virginia Tech. For their accomplishment, the Peach Bowl invited them to play in their 1992 contest. The team played NC State and came from behind to win 37–34. The Pirates finished the season ranked number No. 9 in the AP and Coaches Poll. After the season, Lewis won the 1991 Coach-of-the-Year Award. Lewis left East Carolina with a 21–12–1 record to become the new head coach at Georgia Tech.

=== Steve Logan era (1992–2002) ===
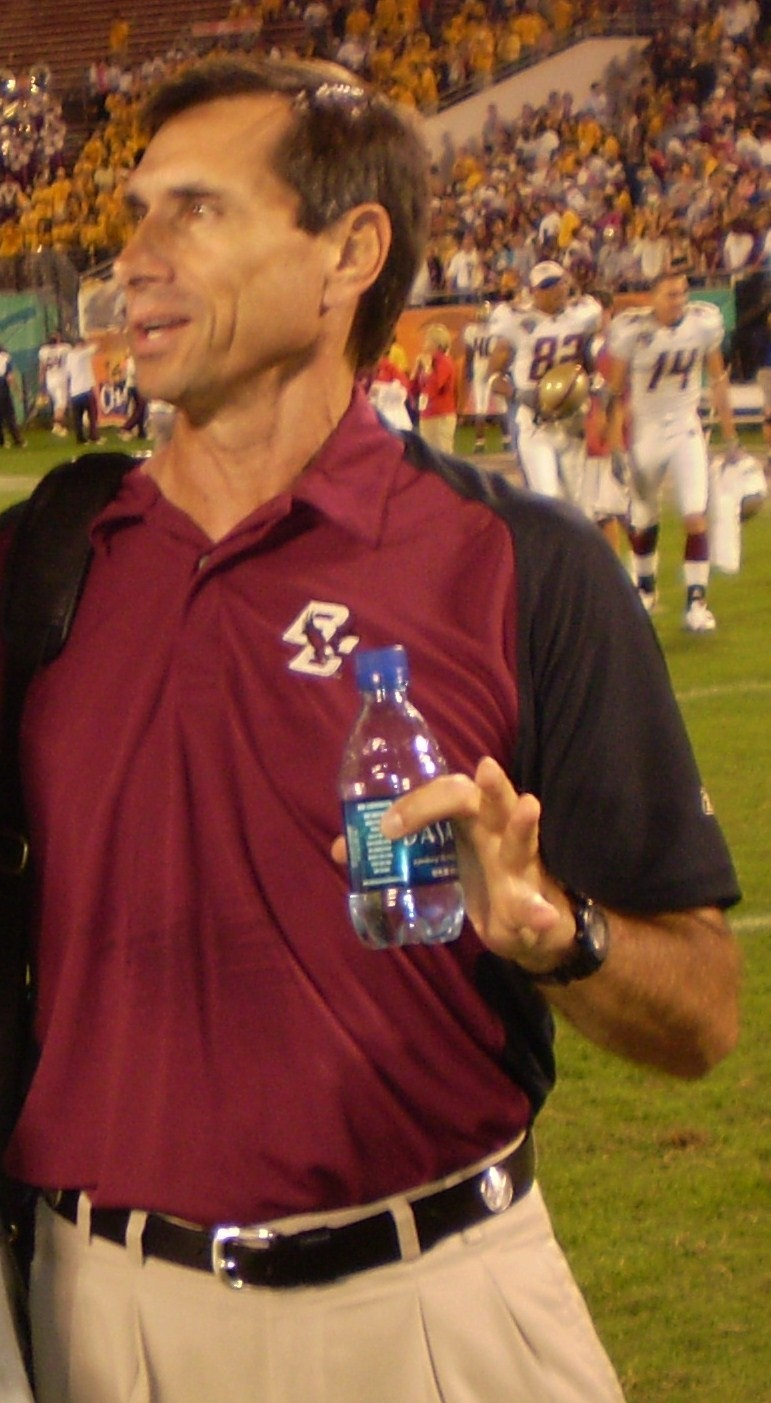
Coach Logan

The Pirates chose their offensive coordinator Steve Logan to succeed Lewis, promoting him to serve as their 17th head football coach. He led East Carolina for eleven seasons, from 1992 to 2002. The 1992 and 1993 seasons were both losing efforts.

In 1994 Coach Logan logged his first winning season as a head coach, with ECU winning seven games and losing four in the regular season. The team was rewarded by being invited to the Liberty Bowl to face Illinois. The Fighting Illini shut out the Pirates 30–0. This was their first bowl game shutout since the Elks Bowl against Morris Harvey in 1954. The Pirates took the momentum from the 1994 season and increased their win count to nine, while losing three in the 1995 season. The only losses were to Tennessee, Illinois and Cincinnati. For their victories, the Pirates were invited again to the Liberty Bowl in Memphis, Tennessee, where they played Stanford and won 19–13. After the bowl game victory, East Carolina was ranked number 23 in the final Coaches Poll of the year.

The 1996 season was another winning year, where they went 8–3 with wins over South Carolina, Miami and NC State. Because they were still Independent, with no bowl tie-ins, the Pirates were left out of post-season play. For the 1997 season, the university was invited to Conference USA. This would be the football team's first year of conference play since they left the Southern Conference in 1976. The team struggled for their first two Conference USA seasons, going 5–6 and 6–5, respectively.

The next three years were more fruitful for the Pirates with quarterback David Garrard. Garrard would go on to a successful NFL career with the Jacksonville Jaguars as well as one season with the New York Jets. The team enjoyed three straight bowls, losing two while winning one. After going 4–8 in 2002, the administration and Logan agreed to part ways. Logan left ECU as the winningest head coach in school history, surpassing Clarence Stasavich during the 1999 season. Logan's record at ECU was 69–58.

=== John Thompson era (2003–2004) ===
Replacing Logan as the Pirates head coach was Florida defensive coordinator John Thompson. Thompson came to ECU with a resume as an assistant coach, working under Lou Holtz at Arkansas, Joe Raymond Peace at Louisiana Tech, Curley Hallman and Jeff Bower at Southern Miss, Houston Nutt at Arkansas and Ron Zook at Florida.

Coach Thompson's tenure set the Pirates back several years, accumulating only three wins over two years, with records of 1–11 in 2003 and 2–9 in 2004. His teams beat only Army both years and Tulane his second year. Amid much fan and administration impatience and frustration with the struggles of the football program, athletics director Terry Holland fired Thompson after the 2004 season. Thompson left with an abysmal 3–20 record.

=== Skip Holtz era (2005–2009) ===
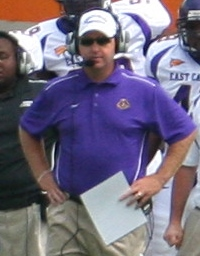
Coach Holtz

In December 2004, Holland brought in former UConn head coach Skip Holtz, son of legendary coach Lou Holtz, to become the Pirates nineteenth head football coach.

In his first season, Coach Holtz helped turn the team around winning five games, two more wins than the John Thompson had accomplished in his entire tenure. His second season marked the Pirates first winning season since 2000, winning seven games, and East Carolina was bowl-eligible for the first time since the 2001 season. The 2006 team had notable wins over Virginia, Southern Miss, Central Florida and North Carolina State. A loss to Rice in the last conference game of the year kept the Pirates out of the Conference USA Championship Game. For the teams winning season, the newly created Papajohns.com Bowl invited the team to play in their contest, where East Carolina lost to former C-USA rival South Florida, 24–7.

In 2007, Holtz' Pirates continued their winning ways. The team won eight regular season games, earning the team their second bowl game in two years. The Pirates played the Boise State in the Hawai'i Bowl, defeating the Broncos by a score of 41–38. The Hawaii Bowl win marked the first for the Pirates since the Galleryfurniture.com Bowl win against Texas Tech in 2000.

On August 30, 2008, the Pirates pulled off a stunning upset against then 17th ranked Virginia Tech 27–22 on a late blocked punt returned for a touchdown by senior wide receiver T.J. Lee. The following week they pulled off an even stronger upset of then 8th ranked West Virginia by the score of 24–3, not allowing a touchdown for the entire game. This was the Pirates third straight victory against a top-25 ranked opponent, counting Boise State from the year before. As a result, East Carolina was awarded with the number 14 ranking in the Associated Press poll and 20th in the USA Today poll, the highest since January 1992 when the Pirates were ranked ninth. The Pirates finished the 2008 regular season at 9–5, winning the Eastern Division of Conference USA and defeating Tulsa in the Championship game. This was the first Conference Championship for ECU since 1976. ECU was then invited to the Auto Zone Liberty bowl to face Kentucky, where the Pirates controlled the first half, but fell to UK 25–19. The next season, East Carolina produced a second Conference USA title with a 38–32 win over Houston, and finished the season at 9–5 after an overtime loss to the Arkansas in the Liberty Bowl.

On January 14, 2010, it was announced that Holtz was leaving his position at East Carolina to take the head football coach position at the South Florida, replacing the recently fired Jim Leavitt. Holtz left ECU with a 38–27 record.

=== Ruffin McNeill era (2010–2015) ===
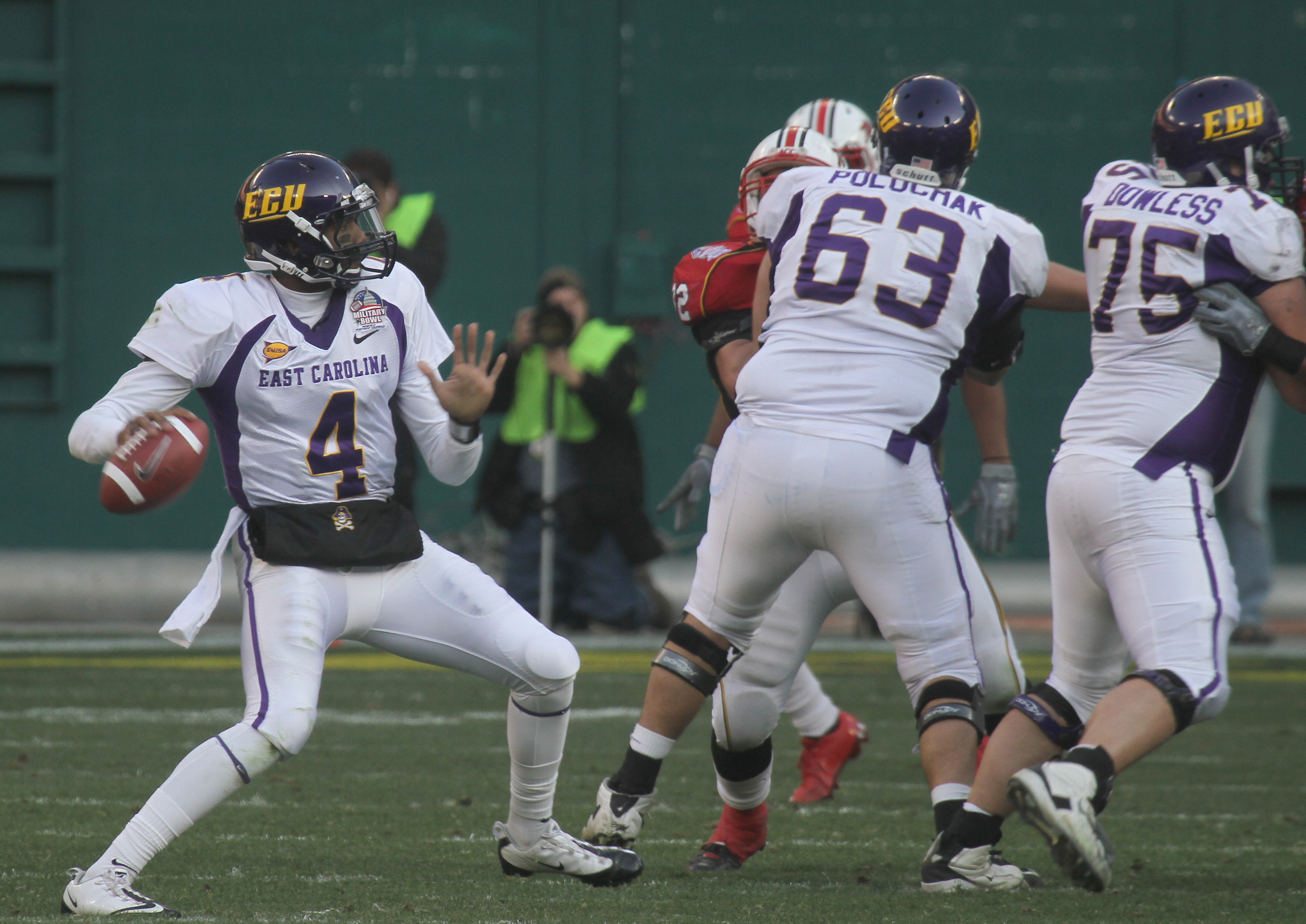
Dominique Davis drops back to pass during the 2010 Military Bowl

On January 21, 2010, it was announced that Texas Tech defensive coordinator Ruffin McNeill would become the 20th head coach of the Pirates. McNeill was a defensive back for the Pirates for four years, three of which he was a starter and two he served as team captain. McNeill graduated from East Carolina University in 1980. McNeill's hiring made him the first African American head coach in ECU football history.

In his first season, the Pirates went 6–6 beating in state rival NC State. They lost to Maryland in the Military Bowl to finish the season at 6–7. 2011 saw the Pirates going 5–7 before bouncing back in 2012 finishing 8–5, losing to Louisiana-Lafayette in the New Orleans Bowl by a score of 43–34.

In 2013, McNeill took the Pirates to a 10–3 season; the second time in school history. The season included a 55–31 win over North Carolina in Chapel Hill, finishing with a bowl win over Ohio in the Beef O' Brady's Bowl. The 2014 campaign started off promising with a 28–21 win at Virginia Tech and a 70–41 win over North Carolina. The momentum would slow down as the Pirates finished 8–4 before losing to Florida in the Birmingham Bowl.

After a 2015 campaign where the Pirates regressed to 5–7 overall and 3–5 in American Athletic Conference play, East Carolina athletics director Jeff Compher announced on December 4, 2015, that the university had fired McNeill. McNeill finished his 6-year tenure at East Carolina with a 42–34 overall record, 30–18 combined Conference USA and American Athletic Conference records, and a 1–3 bowl record.

=== Scottie Montgomery era (2016–2018) ===
On December 13, 2015, athletics director Jeff Compher announced Scottie Montgomery as the 21st head football coach at East Carolina University. Montgomery came to Greenville after a stint as associate head coach and offensive coordinator at Duke under head coach David Cutcliffe. Montgomery had served as wide receivers coach for the NFL's Pittsburgh Steelers under head coach Mike Tomlin, and in that same role at Duke.

In Montgomery's first season, the Pirates compiled a record of 3–9. The Pirates won their first two games of the season, defeating FCS opponent Western Carolina by a margin of 52–7 and archrival NC State by a score of 33–30. However, Montgomery's squad dropped their next five, beginning with a 20–15 loss to South Carolina. On September 24, East Carolina lost to Virginia Tech by a score of 54–17. That was followed by a 47–29 loss to UCF. On October 8, Montgomery's Pirates lost to South Florida by a score of 38–22. The Pirates were scheduled to host Navy on October 13, but due to Hurricane Matthew battering the North Carolina coast that weekend, the game was rescheduled for November 19. After a 31–19 loss to Cincinnati, the Pirates snapped their five-game skid by dominating UConn to the tune of 41–3. East Carolina lost their last four games to finish the season; falling to Tulsa by a score of 45–24, SMU by a margin of 55–31, Navy by a score of 66–31 and Temple by a score of 37–10.

Montgomery was terminated before the 2018 season finale after three seasons.

=== Mike Houston era (2019–2024) ===
On December 3, 2018, ECU announced the hiring of Mike Houston as the 22nd head coach in the program's history. Houston came to ECU after spending the previous 3 seasons as head coach at James Madison University, having won an FCS National Championship with the team in 2016; he won a Southern Conference championship as head coach of The Citadel and had a Division II National Runner-up as head coach at Lenoir–Rhyne.

On October 20, 2024, Houston was fired after a 3-4 start to the season and a 27-38 overall record.

=== Blake Harrell Era (2024-) ===
On October 20, 2024, Harrell was announced to be the interim head coach for East Carolina. After winning 4 straight games as the interim, Harrell was announced to be the programs 23rd Head Coach on November 27, 2024. Harrell had served for 5 years as the program's defensive coordinator.

== Conference affiliations ==
- Independent (1932–1946)
- North State Conference (1947–1961)
- Independent (1962–1964)
- Southern Conference (1965–1976)
- Independent (1977–1996)
- Conference USA (1997–2013)
- American Conference (2014–present)

== Championships ==
=== Conference championships ===
East Carolina has been in a total of four conferences: North State, Southern, Conference USA and the American Athletic Conference. The team were the champions in the North State Conference in 1953. The Pirates won the Southern Conference three times outright, and shared the championship once. On December 5, 2008, East Carolina Defeated Tulsa 27–24 to capture the 2008 Conference USA championship, their first conference title in 32 years. On December 5, 2009, they defeated Houston 38–32 to win their 2nd straight C-USA title.

Season	Coach	Conference	Overall record	Conference record
1953	Jack Boone	North State Conference	8–2	6–0
1966†	Clarence Stasavich	Southern Conference	4–5–1	4–1–1
1972	Sonny Randle	Southern Conference	9–2	6–0
1973	Sonny Randle	Southern Conference	9–2	6–0
1976	Pat Dye	Southern Conference	9–2	4–1
2008	Skip Holtz	Conference USA	9–5	6–2
2009	Skip Holtz	Conference USA	9–5	7–1

† Co-champion

=== Division championships ===
Year	Division	Coach	Opponent	CG result
2008	Conference USA - East	Skip Holtz	Tulsa	W 27–24
2009	Conference USA - East	Skip Holtz	Houston	W 38–32
2012†	Conference USA - East	Ruffin McNeil	N/A lost tiebreaker to UCF	

† Co-champion

== Bowl games ==
The Pirates have participated in 23 bowl games compiling a record of 12–11. The team went to one bowl game twice, the Tangerine Bowl and have been to the Liberty Bowl four times. One bowl game was cancelled.

Season	Coach	Bowl	Opponent	Result
December 13, 1952	Jack Boone	Lions Bowl	Clarion	L 6–13
January 2, 1954	Jack Boone	Elks Bowl	Morris Harvey	L 0–12
December 14, 1963	Clarence Stasavich	Eastern Bowl	Northeastern	W 27–6
December 12, 1964	Clarence Stasavich	Tangerine Bowl	UMass	W 14–13
December 11, 1965	Clarence Stasavich	Tangerine Bowl	Maine	W 31–0
December 16, 1978	Pat Dye	Independence Bowl	Louisiana Tech	W 35–13
January 1, 1992	Bill Lewis	Peach Bowl †	NC State	W 37–34
December 31, 1994	Steve Logan	Liberty Bowl	Illinois	L 0–30
December 30, 1995	Steve Logan	Liberty Bowl	Stanford	W 19–13
December 22, 1999	Steve Logan	Mobile Alabama Bowl	TCU	L 14–28
December 27, 2000	Steve Logan	Galleryfurniture.com Bowl	Texas Tech	W 40–27
December 19, 2001	Steve Logan	GMAC Bowl	Marshall	L 61–64 ^{2OT}
December 23, 2006	Skip Holtz	PapaJohns.com Bowl	South Florida	L 7–24
December 23, 2007	Skip Holtz	Hawaiʻi Bowl	Boise State	W 41–38
January 2, 2009	Skip Holtz	Liberty Bowl	Kentucky	L 19–25
January 2, 2010	Skip Holtz	Liberty Bowl	Arkansas	L 17–20 ^{OT}
December 29, 2010	Ruffin McNeill	Military Bowl	Maryland	L 20–51
December 22, 2012	Ruffin McNeill	New Orleans Bowl	Louisiana	L 34–43
December 23, 2013	Ruffin McNeill	Beef 'O' Brady's Bowl	Ohio	W 37–20
January 3, 2015	Ruffin McNeill	Birmingham Bowl	Florida	L 20–28
December 27, 2021	Mike Houston	Military Bowl	Boston College	Cancelled
December 27, 2022	Mike Houston	Birmingham Bowl	Coastal Carolina	W 53–29
December 28, 2024	Blake Harrell	Military Bowl	NC State	W 26–21
December 27, 2025	Blake Harrell	Military Bowl	Pittsburgh	W 23–17

† New Year's Six

== Head coaches ==
There have been 22 head coaches of the Pirates. Steve Logan is the all-time leader in games coached, years coached, and wins, while John Christenbury leads all coaches in winning percentage with 0.867. O. A. Hankner is statistically the worst coach the Pirates have had in terms of winning percentage, with .000.

== Facilities ==
=== Dowdy–Ficklen Stadium ===
The Pirates play their home games at Bagwell Field at Dowdy–Ficklen Stadium in Greenville, North Carolina. The stadium is located at the intersection of 14th Street and Charles Avenue. It has a maximum capacity of 50,000. Bagwell Field has been recognized as having the second best field design in the nation.

Dr. Leo Jenkins, President of East Carolina, announced his plans to build a new stadium for the Pirates on October 7, 1961. It took a year for Dr. Jenkins to raise $283,387, even though only $200,000 was requested. The James Skinner Ficklen Memorial Stadium was dedicated on September 21, 1963. The stadium included stands on the south side, a press box and a lighting system.

James S. Ficklen, a Greenville tobacco company executive, established the Ficklen Foundation, which is a financial aid foundation. Ronald and Mary Ellen Dowdy, a real estate developer in Orlando, Florida, donated $1 million to the school. For his donation, Ficklen Stadium was renamed the Dowdy–Ficklen Stadium in 1994. Al and Debbie Bagwell of Lake Gaston, Virginia, donated a large gift to the school and the field was named Bagwell Field in their honor in 1995.

Dowdy–Ficklen Stadium has gone through many enhancements over the years. The north side stands were built in 1968, increasing capacity to 20,000. During 1977–1978, seating was increased by 15,000. In 1994, the stadium was renamed Dowdy-Ficklen and roads were improved around the stadium. For the 1996–1998 seasons, the upper deck on the north side was built and improvements were made to the press box on the south side. A new scoreboard was introduced in 1999 and a 12-foot (3.7 m), three ton sculpture of the Pirate was unveiled.

The east end zone has been enclosed, bringing the stadium's capacity to 50,000. An 88 ft x 28 ft HD scoreboard was added to the top of the section, which stands as one of the largest and most advanced scoreboards in the nation.

In May 2016, East Carolina revealed a $55 million renovation project for Dowdy–Ficklen Stadium, which is a portion of its athletic facilities master plan. The project included a four-story tower above the south side stands with over 1,000 new premium seats and boxes, a new press box, and a new field-level club section in the north end zone. It began construction after the 2017 football season. The expansion, known as TowneBank Tower, was completed in August 2019.

=== Cliff Moore Practice Facility ===
The NFL-caliber Cliff Moore Practice Facility is located between Dowdy–Ficklen Stadium and Clark-LeClair Stadium on Charles Boulevard. The facility is a hallmark of the ECU athletic complex and consists of three fields, two natural and one FieldTurf. The natural fields are based on Dowdy-Ficklen field. The fields are Bermuda Tift grass with gravel and sand-based drainage. The fields are parallel to one another and run north to south. The FieldTurf field is perpendicular to the natural grass fields. The field is 78,120 square feet (7,258 m^{2}).

=== Murphy Center ===
The Murphy Center is located in the west endzone at Dowdy–Ficklen Stadium. It is a 52,475-square-foot (4,875.1 m^{2}) multi-purpose building. The building opened its doors to ECU student-athletes in June 2002 and was dedicated on September 13, 2002. On the ground floor is the Walter and Marie Williams Strength and Conditioning Area where athletes train. Also on the ground floor is the Robert and Virginia Maynard Lobby. On the second story is the C. Felix and Margaret Blount Harvey Banquet Hall, the Dick and Susan Jones Academic Enhancement Center and the Bill and Emily Furr Lobby. Located between Harvey Hall and the Jones Academic Enhancement Center is the sport memorabilia area. The building is named for Pete and Lynn Murphy of Rose Hill, North Carolina. The center was built for approximately $13 million.

=== Ward Sports Medicine Building ===
The Ward Sports Medicine Building is located adjacent to the Murphy Center at East Carolina. It is a three-story building that was built in 1989. It is 80,283 square feet (7,458.5 m^{2}) and cost $8 million to build.

On the first floor are football locker rooms, athletic training room, equipment room, and a women's locker room which hosts the ECU softball, women's soccer, and women's tennis teams. Also on the first floor are meeting rooms for the football team. The eight rooms consist of one 107-seat team meeting room, one 55-seat unit room, and six 12 to 15 team positional rooms.

On the second floor are football and basketball offices, the ECU Hall of Fame, and classrooms for students. On the third floor, the Pirate Club, the director of athletics Terry Holland, and other administrative and support officials have offices. The building is named for two alumni, Robert Allen (Bob) and Margaret Ann Cude Ward.

== Rivalries ==
=== Marshall ===
East Carolina and Marshall have a "friendly" rivalry with one another. They are forever bonded in history by the tragic plane crash on November 14, 1970. The Thundering Herd were coming back from Greenville, North Carolina after a 17–14 loss to the Pirates when their plane crashed near Ceredo, West Virginia. The teams have been bonded ever since. East Carolina has since installed a large Marshall Memorial plaque outside of Dowdy–Ficklen Stadium honoring those that passed in the crash.

One of East Carolina and Marshall's most memorable games was the 2001 GMAC Bowl as they combined for a bowl record 125 points. Marshall overcame a 30-point deficit to beat East Carolina 64–61 in double overtime. East Carolina left for the American Conference in 2014, leaving questions as to the future of the series, but the two teams announced a home-and-home series for 2021 and 2023.

East Carolina leads the all-time record over Marshall 11–6. ECU is 6–3 against the Herd from 2005 to 2013 when both schools were in Conference USA.

=== NC State ===
ECU has played N.C. State 32 times since their 1st meeting in 1970. The schools are approximately 85 miles (137 km) apart and are the largest (N.C. State) and third largest (East Carolina) universities in the state. The series started as a yearly occurrence, from 1970 to 1987, but was halted after ECU fans rioted and stormed the NC State field in 1987. The next time the two teams played was in the 1992 Peach Bowl, when the Pirates came from behind to win 37–34. The Wolfpack's first trip to Greenville occurred in 1999 when No. 23 East Carolina beat State 23–6. In the 2006 season, the Wolfpack and Pirates agreed to a five-year home-and-home series to revive the rivalry.

2007 brought the creation of the football rivalry trophy, The Victory Barrel, created in a collaborative effort by both schools' Student Governments. East Carolina and N.C. State will extend the series with games added in 2025 and 2028. NC State leads the overall series 20–14 through the 2025 season.

=== UCF ===
A rivalry that became intense in the 2010s is ECU's rivalry with the UCF Knights. Considered one of the more entertaining rivalries during UCF's time in the American Athletic Conference, the teams have met 21 times from 1991 to 2022. After taking a 1-year hiatus in 2013, the teams both continued to meet annually as members of the East Division of the American Conference till UCF's move to the Big 12 Conference in 2023. East Carolina leads the series 11–10, with ECU winning the last meeting 34–13.

The most notable matchup of the rivalry was the 2014 iteration, an ESPN primetime Thursday night game that saw East Carolina score 21 unanswered points in the 4th quarter to take the lead, only to fall to a 51-yard Hail Mary touchdown from Justin Holman to Breshad Perriman with time expiring.

=== Charlotte ===
The Pirates’ newest rivals are the Charlotte 49ers, With the two teams first meeting in 2023, a 10–7 victory for the 49ers. Charlotte and East Carolina are slated to be annual rivals as members of the American Athletic Conference, unveiled in scheduling plans in November 2023. Charlotte was slated to play ECU when the Pirates were members of Conference USA, but ECU left before Charlotte’s new football team could pass the 2-year transition period from FCS to FBS in 2015. Pirates head coach Mike Houston was offered to be the 49ers head coach in November 2018, before turning around accepting the Pirates Job instead on December 3, with Charlotte hiring Will Healy instead. After a 55-24 loss to the 49ers in October 2024, the 49ers lead the series 2–1.

=== North Carolina ===
East Carolina and North Carolina is the 11th-most played series for ECU since 1978. Because both are large state schools, East Carolina being the third largest and North Carolina being the second largest, many fans and alumni live close to one another. The series began in 1972; the two played eight times between 1972 and 1981 (all in Chapel Hill), and ten times since 2001. Overall, UNC officially leads the series 11-5-1 (12-5-1 including the vacated 2009 game). ECU has won the last three contests by large margins (55-31 in 2013, 70–41 in 2014, and 41–19 in 2018).

The ECU-UNC football series is also political in nature. In 1973, then ECU Chancellor Leo Warren Jenkins approached the North Carolina General Assembly and UNC system President William Friday about establishing a four-year medical school at ECU. At the time, North Carolina's only public medical school was in Chapel Hill and had been since 1879. ECU had a smaller program where students completed one year in Greenville and then transferred to finish their medical education at the larger school in Chapel Hill. Friday was concerned that the state could not afford to fund two medical schools, and refused to recommend to the General Assembly that ECU be granted a full-time four-year medical school. The 1973 game in Chapel Hill resulted in a 28-27 UNC victory, but the underdog Pirates' competitiveness with the state's flagship university stunned the media and fans assembled at Kenan Stadium. In 1974, President Friday changed his mind on Chancellor Jenkins' request to establish a four-year medical school at ECU, and, today, the Brody School of Medicine operates alongside its sister school in Chapel Hill as the state's only publicly funded medical schools.

== Traditions ==
- Colors – The Pirates official colors are old gold and royal purple. Helmets are metallic purple with the skull and crossbones logo. Uniforms are either all purple, purple and white, or all white. In 2013, ECU also released an alternate black uniform for the September 5th game against FAU. Since the debut of the all black uniform, ECU now also wears variations of purple and black as well as black and white.
- Songs – The fight song, known as E.C. Victory, is played after every touchdown or big play. The football players sing the alma mater with the students after every home game. The Jimi Hendrix song Purple Haze plays as the players run onto the field before kickoff.
- Nicknames – East Carolina football teams have had several nicknames over the years including the Teachers, Buccaneers, or EC. Originally, the sports teams were called the Teachers. In 1934, the Men's Athletic Association decided they wanted a new nickname to inspire "more spirit and enthusiasm." The Pirate was chosen, and is the official nickname.
- Mascots – The Pirate is the official mascot of the university. It was formerly known as PeeDee the Pirate, from its inception in 1983 until December 1985, when Chancellor Howell dropped PeeDee from the name. The university once again adopted the name PeeDee the Pirate after the unveiling of an updated look for the Pirate in the 2008 homecoming football game against the Marshall Thundering Herd. The first official mascot was Buc, a Great Dane. He was the mascot from 1958, until his death in 1961. Other mascots included Pete, a dog who was a mascot in the 1970s and a live wildcat from 1930 to 1931.
- Game day traditions – Many game weekend traditions occur each home football game. Each Friday is Purple and Gold Day, or Paint it Purple Fridays. Supporters of the university are encouraged to wear colors and insignias of the university the day before the game. Before each game, the Pirate Walk occurs. The football players walk from the North side of the stadium to the locker room and fans come by to show support to the team. When ECU takes the field, they run through purple smoke, before huddling up and running onto the field. A cannon is fired when the players run onto the field and after every score. During the intermission between the third and fourth quarter a new flag is raised. The normal jolly roger flag with a black background is lowered and replaced with a No Quarter flag. The No Quarter flag is a jolly roger flag with a burgundy background, to symbolize soaked blood. Below the jolly roger are the words No Quarter.

== Players of note ==
=== All-Americans ===
Every year, several publications release lists of their ideal "team". The athletes on these lists are referred to as All-Americans. The NCAA recognizes five All-American lists. They are the Associated Press, American Football Coaches Association, Football Writers Association of America, The Sporting News, and the Walter Camp Football Foundation. Some of these also have levels such as a first team All-American, or second team, or third team. A consensus All-American is determined using a point system; three points if the player was selected for the first team, two points for the second team, and one point for the third team. East Carolina has had 27 All-Americans (three consensus) in its history.

1955	Lou Hallow – Lineman
1964	Bill Cline – QB
1965	Dave Alexander – FB
1974	Danny Kepley – LB
1975	Jim Bolding – DB
1976	Jim Bolding – DB
	Cary Godette – DE
1979	Wayne Inman – OL
1981	Tootie Robbins – OL

1982	Jody Schulz – DE
1983	Terry Long – OL
1989	Junior Robinson – DB, KR
1990	Robert Jones – LB
1991	Jeff Blake – QB
	Dion Johnson – WR, KR
	Robert Jones – LB
1992	Tom Scott – OL
1993	Carlester Crumpler Jr. – TE

1999	Andrew Bayes – P
2001	Pernell Griffin – LB
	Leonard Henry – FB
2007	Chris Johnson – RB, KR
2009	Matt Dodge – P
2014	Justin Hardy – WR
2016	Zay Jones – WR
2018	Nate Harvey – LB
2021	Ja'Quan McMillian – DB

=== NCAA records ===
2016 – Wide receiver Zay Jones became the NCAA Division I football single season leader in receptions with 158 for the 2016 season, breaking the record of 155 set by Freddie Barnes of Bowling Green in 2009.

2016 – Wide receiver Zay Jones became the NCAA Division I football career leader in receptions with 399 receptions from 2013 to 2016, breaking the record of 387 held by his former ECU Pirate teammate Justin Hardy.

2016 – With a 33–30 victory over rival North Carolina State on September 9, 2016, ECU became the first "Non-Power" program to defeat a single "Power Conference" (vs. ACC) six-consecutive times from 2013 to 2016, thereby breaking a four-way tie with TCU (vs. BIG XII), Boise State (vs. PAC-12), and BYU (vs. PAC-12) all of which each had previously established five-game winning streaks against a single "Power Conference." ECU defeated regional rivals Virginia Tech, North Carolina, and North Carolina State two-consecutive times each respectively during the Pirates' six-game winning streak against the ACC.

2014 – Wide receiver Justin Hardy became the NCAA Division I football career leader in receptions with 387 receptions from 2010 to 2014, breaking the record of 349 held by Ryan Broyles of the University of Oklahoma.

2011 – Quarterback Dominique Davis became the NCAA Division I football career leader in consecutive completions in a single game with 26 completions against the Naval Academy on October 22, 2011, breaking the record of 23 straight completions set in 1998 by Tee Martin of Tennessee against South Carolina and tied in 2004 by Aaron Rodgers of California versus Southern California.

2011 – Quarterback Dominique Davis became the NCAA Division I football career leader in consecutive completions in one or more games with 36 completions, last 10 attempts vs. Memphis, Oct. 15, 2011 and first 26 vs. Navy, Oct. 22, 2011, breaking the NCAA mark of 26 set in 2004 by Aaron Rodgers.

2007 – Chris Johnson set an NCAA bowl record with 408 all-purpose yards in a 41–38 victory over No. 24 Boise State in the Hawaii Bowl on December 23, 2007.

=== Individual honors ===
2014 – Quarterback Shane Carden was named the American Athletic Conference Offensive Player of the Year.

2013 – Quarterback Shane Carden was named the Conference USA Most Valuable Player.

2010 – Wide receiver Dwayne Harris was named the Conference USA Most Valuable Player.

1991 – Head Coach Bill Lewis was named the AFCA Division I-A Coach of the Year.

1991 – Quarterback Jeff Blake was named ECAC Division I-A Player-of-the-Year after leading Pirates to No. 9 national ranking (Blake also finished seventh in the 1991 Heisman Trophy balloting).

=== NFL draft ===
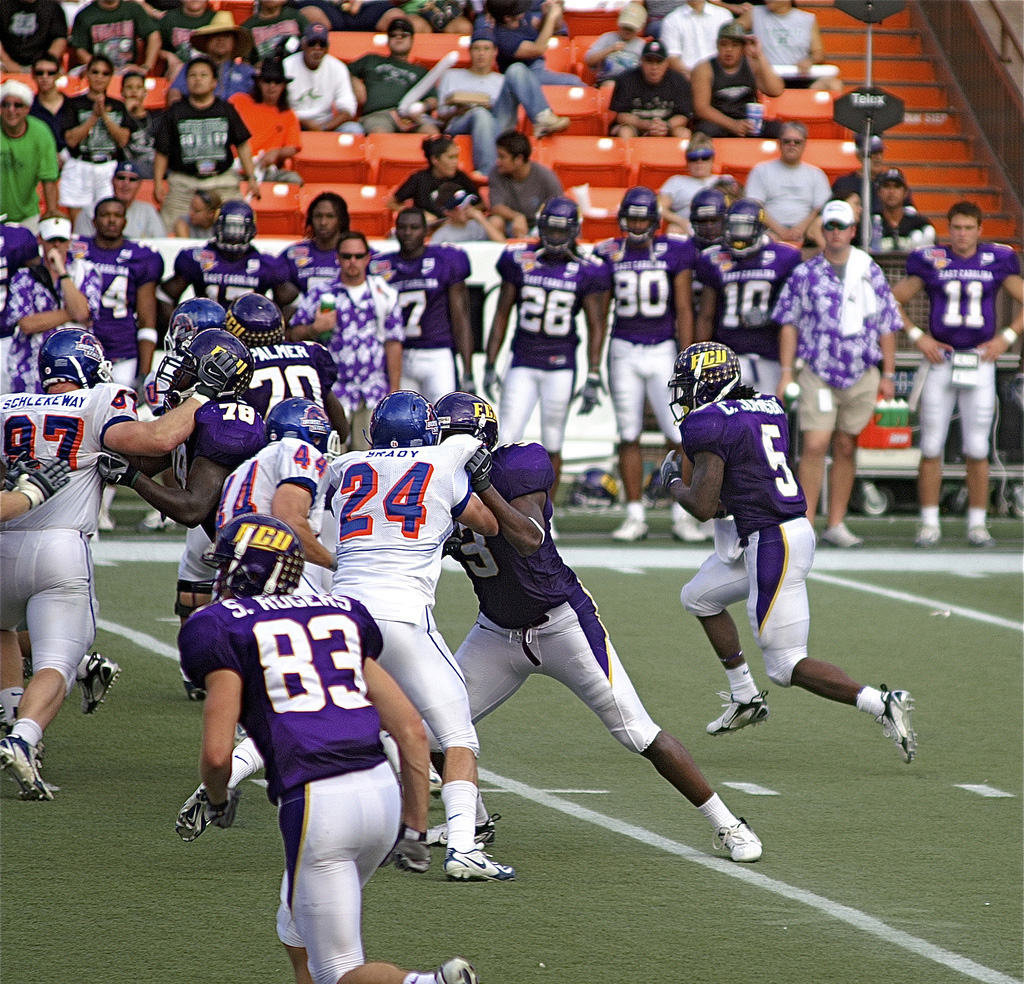
Chris Johnson, the 24th overall pick in the 2008 NFL draft

East Carolina has had 67 players picked in the NFL draft as of 2022. Their first ever selection was Roger Thrift, a blocker that was picked by the Cleveland Browns, in the 1951 NFL draft. In the 1992 NFL draft, linebacker Robert Jones was picked in the first round (#24 overall) and in the 2008 NFL draft, running back Chris Johnson, was picked by the Tennessee Titans (#24 overall).

=== Retired numbers ===
East Carolina have retired four jerseys for their football team. Two players died while on the team, Robert Farris and Norman Swindell, and the two other players, James Speight and Roger Thrift, set record while playing for the Pirates.

East Carolina Pirates retired numbers
No.	Player	Pos.	Tenure	Ref.
16	Robert Farris ^{†}	K	?–1967	
18	Norman Swindell ^{†}	FB	1963–1965	
29	James Speight	RB	1955–1959	
36	Roger Thrift	QB	1949–1950	

Notes

† = Posthumous honor

== Future non-conference opponents ==
Announced schedules as of October 20, 2026

2027	2028	2029	2030	2031	2032	2033	2034
Western Carolina	NC State	vs. Appalachian State (Note: Duke's Mayo Classic at Bank of America Stadium in Charlotte, NC)	Norfolk State	Old Dominion	Coastal Carolina	at Coastal Carolina	at Clemson
at Northwestern	Coastal Carolina	Old Dominion	at South Carolina	at Coastal Carolina			
Georgia State	Charleston Southern	Liberty	at Old Dominion				
at Coastal Carolina	at Wake Forest		Coastal Carolina				
