= College Stadium =

Stadium in Greenville, North Carolina, US

- Full name: College Stadium
- Former names: Athletic Field
- Location: Greenville, North Carolina
- Owner: East Carolina Teachers College; East Carolina College
- Operator: East Carolina Teachers College; East Carolina College
- Capacity: 2,000
- Surface: Grass

Construction
- Groundbreaking: 1949
- Built: 1949
- Opened: September 21, 1949
- Closed: 1962
- Demolished: 1962
- Cost: $25,730

Tenant
- East Carolina Pirates football (NCAA) 1949–1962

College Stadium was the stadium for the East Carolina Pirates football team. It was built in 1949 for $25,000 (equivalent to $338,000 in 2025). The facility sat 2,000 spectators. The complex was razed in 1962 once Ficklen Memorial Stadium was built. It replaced Guy Smith Stadium as the primary football field.

== History ==
In November 1948, President Messick and boosters of the school met to discuss building a stadium on campus. Boosters at that meeting pledged $8,000 that night. It was decided $25,000 was needed to construct the complex. After a fund raising drive, $25,730 was raised from 1,500 individuals and 227 businesses. It was dedicated on September 21, 1949. The Pirates beat Cherry Point in the first game 24–0. It was located on the east side of the Main Campus approximately where the Brewster Building is today.
