= Guilford Quakers football =

- First season: 1893; 133 years ago
- Athletic director: Bill Foti
- Head coach: Brad Davis; 6th season, 8–35 (.186)
- Location: Greensboro, North Carolina
- Stadium: Armfield Athletic Center (capacity: 2,200 +)
- Conference: ODAC
- Colors: Crimson and gray
- All-time record: 341–641–26 (.351)
- Fight song: On Brave Ol’ Guilford Team

The Guilford Quakers football team represents Guilford College in the sport of college football. The NCAA Division III team first competed in 1893.

Head coach Bear Bryant won his first career game against the Quakers as a coach with Maryland in 1945.

On September 13, 2018, Guilford faced the Davidson Wildcats, a Division I FCS team. The game was initially set for Saturday, September 15, but was rescheduled due to Hurricane Florence. The final score was 91–61, with several records shattered, such as the record for total offensive yards, which reached 964 — surpassing Weber State's 27-year-old record of 876 yards.
