= List of Appalachian State Mountaineers football seasons =

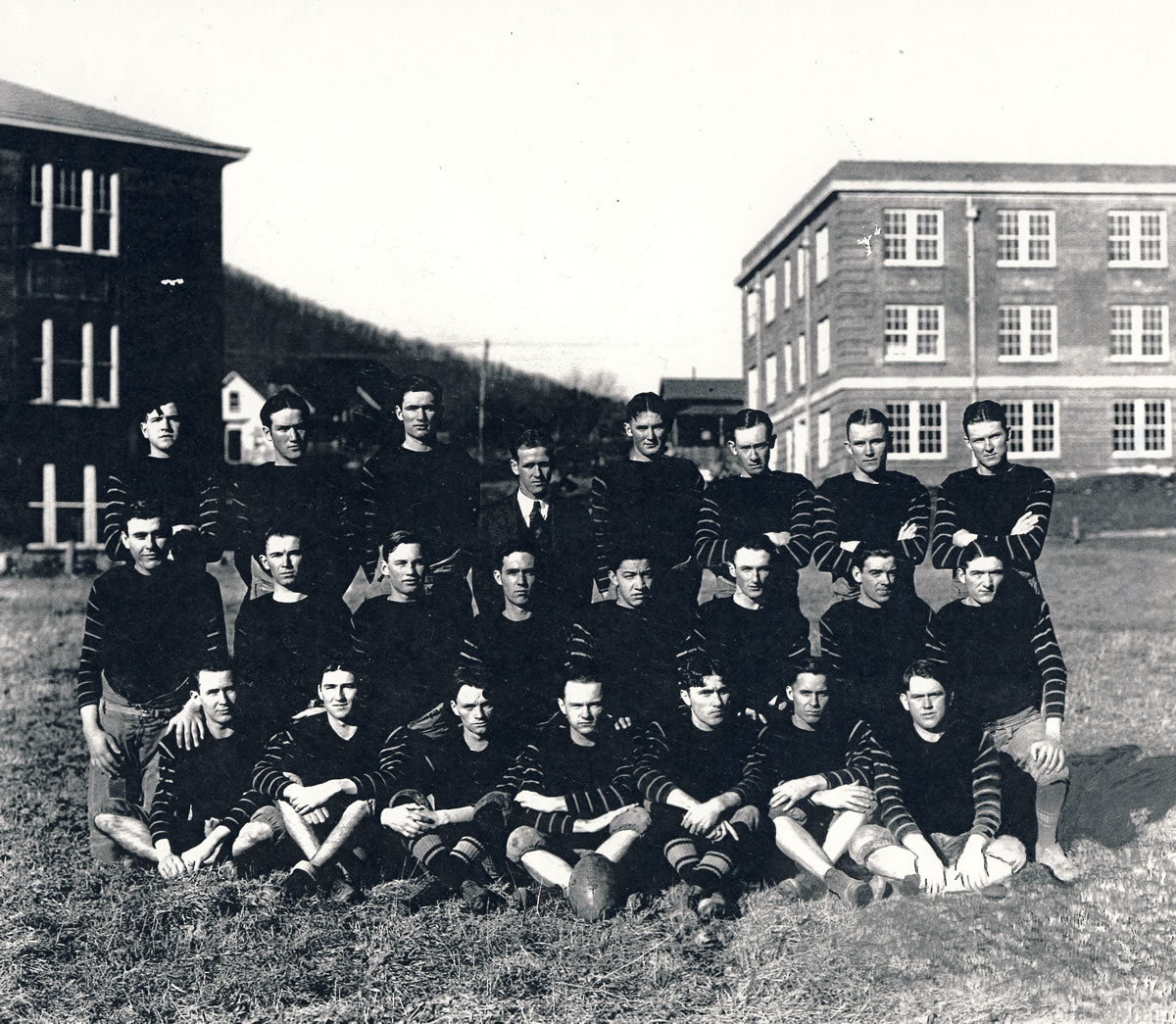
Graydon Eggers, pictured with his 1928 Appalachian State Normal School football team, was the first coach in school history.

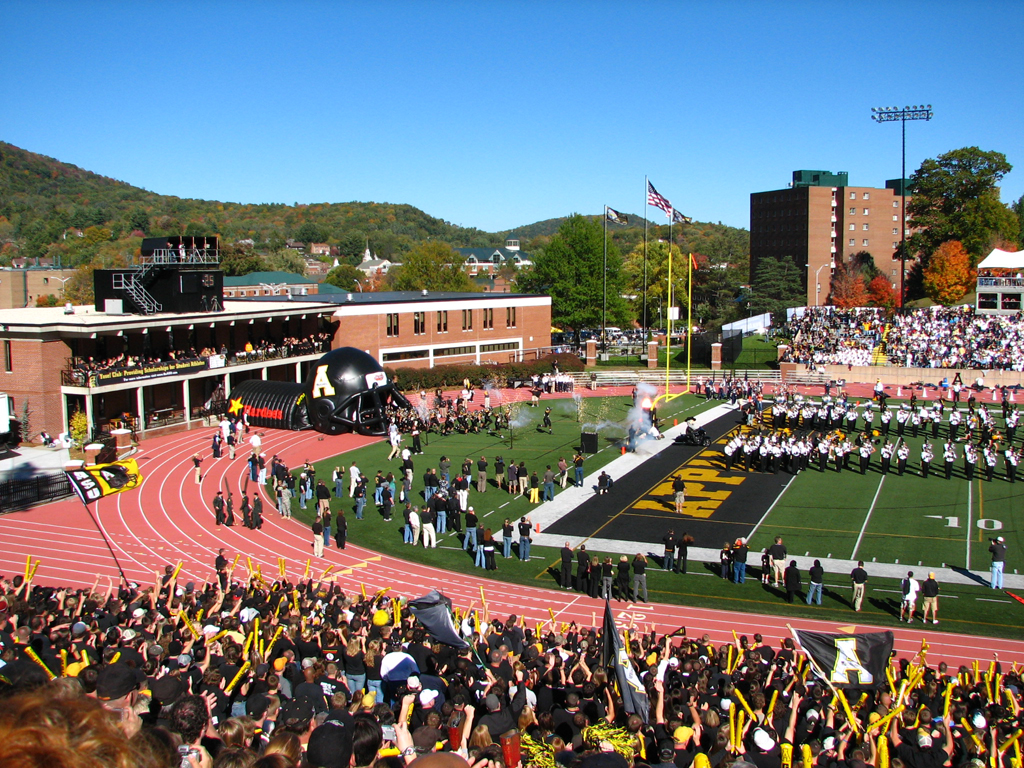
The Mountaineer football team rushes the field prior to kickoff against the Georgia Southern Eagles on October 20, 2007.

The Appalachian State Mountaineers football team competes as part of the National Collegiate Athletic Association (NCAA) Division I Football Bowl Subdivision (FBS), representing Appalachian State University in the East Division of the Sun Belt Conference. The team's current head coach is Dowell Loggains.

The Mountaineers fielded their first team in 1928 under coach Graydon Eggers. From 1928 to 1969, Appalachian State participated in the National Association of Intercollegiate Athletics (NAIA) and spent time playing in the North State Conference/Carolinas Conference, the Smoky Mountain Conference, and as an independent. The Mountaineers transitioned to NCAA Division I in 1971, joining the Southern Conference in 1972. Appalachian State, along with the rest of the Southern Conference, began competing at the I-AA (later known as the Football Championship Subdivision, or FCS) level in 1981. The Mountaineers transitioned to the FBS in 2014, joining the Sun Belt Conference alongside longtime Southern Conference rival Georgia Southern.

The Mountaineers have played 89 seasons of football, compiling a record of 616–337–28 and winning 21 conference championships (6 in the North Star Conference, 12 in the Southern Conference, and 3 in the Sun Belt Conference). The Mountaineers appeared in 9 bowl games during their time in the NAIA, compiling a 3–6 record, and they appeared in the FCS playoffs 20 times, winning three national championships (2005, 2006, and 2007). In their five seasons since joining the FBS in 2014, the Mountaineers have recorded a record of 48–16, five consecutive winning seasons, four consecutive bowl wins, and three straight conference titles.

In 1931 the Mountaineers joined the North State Conference and finished in first place under coach C. B. Johnson. Kidd Brewer took over coaching duties of the Mountaineers from 1935 to 1938, winning another North State Conference championship. An All-American at Duke, Brewer's 1937 squad is best remembered for going unbeaten and unscored upon during the regular season, outscoring opponents 206–0 before losing a postseason game to the Southern Miss Golden Eagles 7–0. In 1967, Appalachian State became an independent team for four years. Jim Brakefield was hired as head coach in 1971, vacating the same position he held at Wofford. A year later, in 1972, Appalachian State accepted an invitation into the Southern Conference. Credited as overseeing the transition into Division I football, Brakefield had his most successful season in 1975, guiding the Mountaineers to an 8–3 record with wins over East Carolina, Wake Forest, and South Carolina.

Appalachian State won two Southern Conference championships in 1986 and 1987 under Sparky Woods. After Woods left to coach South Carolina, Jerry Moore was hired to replace him. Moore went on to become the longest-tenured and winningest coach in team history; the Mountaineers recorded a losing season only once in Moore's 24 seasons as head coach. The Mountaineers recorded a record of 215–87–23 during Moore's venture, making 19 playoff appearances and winning 10 Southern Conference championships. The Mountaineers won three consecutive FCS national championships from 2005 to 2007, becoming the first FCS program to ever win three straight titles and the first team from North Carolina to win a football national championship at any NCAA division level. In addition to winning a national championship in 2007, the Mountaineers recorded one of the biggest upsets in United States sports history when they defeated the fifth-ranked Michigan Wolverines 34–32. The win helped Appalachian State become the first FCS team to ever receive votes in the final Associated Press (AP) college football poll on January 8, 2008.

Following Moore's departure in 2012, the Mountaineers hired Scott Satterfield as head coach. After finishing 4–8 in 2013, their first losing season since 1993 and only 5th since 1980, the Mountaineers began play in the FBS. The Mountaineers have since recorded the most successful FBS transition in NCAA history; they have recorded eight consecutive winning seasons, five consecutive bowl wins (from 2015 to 2020), and four consecutive Sun Belt Championships (from 2016 to 2019), and have won the East Division 3 times over a four-year span (2018–2021). In 2019, after the Conference Championship game but before the New Orleans Bowl, Satterfield left Appalachian State to take the Head Coaching position at Louisville. Satterfield was replaced the following season by Eli Drinkwitz, who left before the 2019 bowl season. Appalachian State coach and Alumni Shawn Clark was hired on December 13, 2019, in time for the 2019 New Orleans Bowl, and coached the Mountaineers until December 2, 2024. On December 9, 2024, Dowell Loggains was announced as the 23rd head coach in program history.

== Seasons ==
=== NAIA (1928–1969) ===
Conference champions	Bowl game berth

Season	Team	Coach	Conference	Season results				Bowl result	Final ranking	
Season	Team	Coach	Conference	Conference finish	Wins	Losses	Ties	Bowl result	AP Poll	Coaches Poll
1928	1928	Graydon Eggers	Independent	—	3	6	0	—	—	—
1929	1929	C. B. Johnson	Independent	—	4	1	3	—	—	—
1930	1930	C. B. Johnson	Independent	—	8	2	1	—	—	—
1931	1931	C. B. Johnson	North State	1st	9	2	2	Won Charlotte Charity Game vs. Catawba, 15–7	—	—
1932	1932	C. B. Johnson	North State	2nd	5	4	1	—	—	—
1933	1933	Eugene Garbee	North State	N/A (Note: The 1933 North State Conference records list no conference champion.)	7	2	0	—	—	—
1934	1934	Eugene Garbee	North State	N/A (Note: The 1934 North State Conference records list no conference champion.)	3	4	1	—	—	—
1935	1935	Kidd Brewer	North State; Smoky Mountain (Note: Appalachian State played in both the North State Conference and the Smoky Mountain Conference from 1935 to 1937.)	N/A (Note: The 1935 North State Conference records list no conference champion.)/3rd	5	2	2	—	—	—
1936	1936	Kidd Brewer	North State; Smoky Mountain	2nd/2nd	8	1	0	—	—	—
1937	1937	Kidd Brewer	North State; Smoky Mountain	1st/2nd	8	1	1	Lost Doll & Toy Charity Game vs. Mississippi State Teachers, 7–0	—	—
1938	1938	Kidd Brewer	North State	3rd	9	1	0	Won Charlotte Charity Game vs. Moravian, 20–0	—	—
1939	1939	Flucie Stewart	North State	1st	7	1	2	—	—	—
1940	1940	R. W. "Red" Watkins	North State	3rd	6	4	0	—	—	—
1941	1941	R. W. "Red" Watkins	North State	4th	4	5	0	—	—	—
1942	1942	Beattie Feathers	North State	3rd	5	2	1	—	—	—
1943	Appalachian State did not play football during the 1943 and 1944 seasons because of World War II									
1944	Appalachian State did not play football during the 1943 and 1944 seasons because of World War II									
1945	1945	Francis Hoover	North State	3rd	1	6	0	—	—	—
1946	1946	Flucie Stewart	North State	2nd	6	3	0	—	—	—
1947	1947	E. C. Duggins	North State	2nd	9	1	0	—	—	—
1948	1948	E. C. Duggins	North State	1st	8	1	1	Lost Burley Bowl vs. West Chester, 7–2	—	—
1949	1949	E. C. Duggins	North State	2nd	9	3	0	Won Pythian Bowl vs. Catawba, 21–7	—	—
1950	1950	E. C. Duggins	North State	1st	9	2	1	Lost Burley Bowl vs. Emory & Henry, 26–6; Lost Pythian Bowl vs. West Liberty, 28–26	—	—
1951	1951	Press Mull	North State	4th	6	3	0	—	—	—
1952	1952	E. C. Duggins	North State	5th	2	6	1	—	—	—
1953	1953	E. C. Duggins	North State	4th	6	4	0	—	—	—
1954	1954	E. C. Duggins	North State	1st	8	3	0	Won Burley Bowl vs. East Tennessee State, 27–13; Lost Elks Bowl vs. Newberry, 20–13	—	—
1955	1955	E. C. Duggins	North State	4th	6	5	0	Lost Burley Bowl vs. East Tennessee State, 7–0	—	—
1956	1956	Bob Broome	North State	3rd	3	6	0	—	—	—
1957	1957	Bob Broome	North State	5th	4	6	0	—	—	—
1958	1958	Bob Broome	North State	2nd	6	4	0	—	—	—
1959	1959	Bob Breitenstein	North State	2nd	6	4	0	—	—	—
1960	1960	Jim Duncan	North State	2nd	8	2	0	—	—	—
1961	1961	Jim Duncan	Carolinas (Note: The North State Conference was renamed the Carolinas Conference in 1961.)	2nd	7	3	0	—	—	—
1962	1962	Jim Duncan	Carolinas	3rd	4	4	2	—	—	—
1963	1963	Jim Duncan	Carolinas	3rd	6	3	0	—	—	—
1964	1964	Jim Duncan	Carolinas	3rd	6	3	0	—	—	—
1965	1965	Carl Messere	Carolinas	5th	5	5	0	—	—	—
1966	1966	Carl Messere	Carolinas	7th	3	6	1	—	—	—
1967	1967	Carl Messere	Carolinas	2nd	7	3	0	—	—	—
1968	1968	Carl Messere	Independent	—	8	2	0	—	—	—
1969	1969	Carl Messere	Independent	—	6	5	0	—	—	—
1970	1970	Carl Messere	Independent	—	5	5	0	—	—	—

=== NCAA Division I/I-A (1971–1981) ===
Conference champions	Bowl game berth

Season	Team	Coach	Conference	Season results				Bowl result	Final ranking	
Season	Team	Coach	Conference	Conference finish	Wins	Losses	Ties	Bowl result	AP Poll	Coaches Poll
1971	1971	Jim Brakefield	Independent	—	7	3	1	—	—	—
1972	1972	Jim Brakefield	Southern	8th	5	5	1	—	—	—
1973	1973	Jim Brakefield	Southern	5th	3	7	1	—	—	—
1974	1974	Jim Brakefield	Southern	2nd	6	5	0	—	—	—
1975	1975	Jim Brakefield	Southern	3rd	8	3	0	—	—	—
1976	1976	Jim Brakefield	Southern	3rd	6	4	1	—	—	—
1977	1977	Jim Brakefield	Southern	6th	2	9	0	—	—	—
1978	1978	Jim Brakefield	Southern	3rd	7	4	0	—	—	—
1979	1979	Jim Brakefield	Southern	5th	3	8	0	—	—	—
1980	1980	Mike Working	Southern	3rd	6	4	1	—	—	—
1981	1981	Mike Working	Southern	7th	3	7	1	—	—	—

=== NCAA Division I-AA/FCS (1982–2013) ===
National champions	Conference champions	Playoff berth

Season	Team	Coach	Conference	Season results				Playoff result	Final ranking	
Season	Team	Coach	Conference	Conference finish	Wins	Losses	Ties	Playoff result	TSN Poll	Coaches Poll (Note: The FCS Coaches Poll Archived 2008-08-28 at the Wayback Machine was introduced in 2007.)
1982	1982	Mike Working	Southern	4th	4	7	0	—	—	—
1983	1983	Mack Brown	Southern	4th	6	5	0	—	—	—
1984	1984	Sparky Woods	Southern	7th	4	7	0	—	—	—
1985	1985	Sparky Woods	Southern	2nd	8	3	0	—	—	—
1986	1986	Sparky Woods	Southern	1st	9	2	1	Lost First Round vs. Nicholls State, 28–26	5	—
1987	1987	Sparky Woods	Southern	1st	11	3	0	Won First Round vs. Richmond, 20–3; Won Quarterfinal vs. Georgia Southern, 19–0; Lost Semifinal vs. Marshall, 24–10	2	—
1988	1988	Sparky Woods	Southern	4th	6	4	1	—	—	—
1989	1989	Jerry Moore	Southern	2nd	9	3	0	Lost First Round vs. Middle Tennessee, 24–21	7	—
1990	1990	Jerry Moore	Southern	2nd	6	5	0	—	—	—
1991	1991	Jerry Moore	Southern	1st	8	4	0	Lost First Round vs. Eastern Kentucky, 14–13	10	—
1992	1992	Jerry Moore	Southern	2nd	7	5	0	Lost First Round vs. Middle Tennessee, 35–10	16	—
1993	1993	Jerry Moore	Southern	4th	4	7	0	—	—	—
1994	1994	Jerry Moore	Southern	2nd	9	4	0	Won First Round vs. New Hampshire, 17–10 (OT); Lost Quarterfinal vs. Boise State, 17–14	9	—
1995	1995	Jerry Moore	Southern	1st	12	1	0	Won First Round vs. James Madison, 31–24; Lost Quarterfinal vs. Stephen F. Austin, 27–17	5	—
1996	1996	Jerry Moore	Southern	4th	7	4	0 (Note: College football introduced overtime in 1996, ending the possibility of ties.)	—	22	—
1997	1997	Jerry Moore	Southern	2nd	7	4	0	—	22	—
1998	1998	Jerry Moore	Southern	2nd	10	3	0	Won First Round vs. Tennessee State, 45–31; Lost Quarterfinal vs. Northwestern State, 31–20	6	—
1999	1999	Jerry Moore	Southern	T–1st	9	3	0	Lost First Round vs. Florida A&M, 44–29	T–9	—
2000	2000	Jerry Moore	Southern	2nd	10	4	0	Won First Round vs. Troy State, 33–30; Won Quarterfinal vs. Western Kentucky, 17–14; Lost Semifinal vs. Montana, 19–16 (OT)	4	—
2001	2001	Jerry Moore	Southern	2nd	9	4	0	Won First Round vs. William & Mary, 40–27; Lost Quarterfinal vs. Georgia Southern, 38–24	4	—
2002	2002	Jerry Moore	Southern	2nd	8	4	0	Lost First Round vs. Maine, 14–13	10	—
2003	2003	Jerry Moore	Southern	2nd	7	4	0	—	—	—
2004	2004	Jerry Moore	Southern	T–3rd	6	5	0	—	—	—
2005	2005	Jerry Moore	Southern	1st	12	3	0	Won First Round vs. Lafayette, 34–23; Won Quarterfinal vs. Southern Illinois, 38–24; Won Semifinal vs. Furman, 29–23; Won Championship vs. Northern Iowa, 21–16	1	—
2006	2006	Jerry Moore	Southern	1st	14	1	0	Won First Round vs. Coastal Carolina, 45–28; Won Quarterfinal vs. Montana State, 38–17; Won Semifinal vs. Youngstown State, 49–24; Won Championship vs. UMass, 28–17	1	—
2007	2007	Jerry Moore	Southern	T–1st	13	2	0	Won First Round vs. James Madison, 28–27; Won Quarterfinal vs. Eastern Washington, 38–35; Won Semifinal vs. Richmond, 55–35; Won Championship vs. Delaware, 49–21	1	1
2008	2008	Jerry Moore	Southern	1st	11	3	0	Won First Round vs. South Carolina State, 37–21; Lost Quarterfinal vs. Richmond, 33–13	5	5
2009	2009	Jerry Moore	Southern	1st	11	3	0	Won First Round vs. South Carolina State, 20–13; Won Quarterfinal vs. Richmond, 35–31; Lost Semifinal vs. Montana, 24–17	3	3
2010	2010	Jerry Moore	Southern	T–1st	10	3	0	Won Second Round vs. Western Illinois, 42–14; Lost Quarterfinal vs. Villanova, 42–24	4	4
2011	2011	Jerry Moore	Southern	T–2nd	8	4	0	Lost Second Round vs. Maine, 34–12	12	11
2012	2012	Jerry Moore	Southern	T–1st	8	4	0	Lost Second Round vs. Illinois State, 38–37 (OT)	9	8
2013	2013	Scott Satterfield	Southern	4th	4	8	0	Ineligible (Note: Appalachian State was ineligible for a conference title or playoff appearance as they were in the first year of their transition to the FBS.)	—	—

=== NCAA Division I-FBS (2014–present) ===
Conference champions	Division champions	Bowl game berth

Season	Team	Coach	Conference	Season results				Bowl result	Final ranking	
Season	Team	Coach	Conference	Conference finish	Division finish	Wins	Losses	Bowl result	AP Poll	Coaches Poll
2014	2014	Scott Satterfield	Sun Belt	3rd	—	7	5	Ineligible (Note: Appalachian State was ineligible for a bowl appearance as they were in the second and final year of their transition to the FBS; a waiver request was denied.)	—	—
2015	2015	Scott Satterfield	Sun Belt	2nd	—	11	2	Won Camellia Bowl vs. Ohio, 31–29	—	—
2016	2016	Scott Satterfield	Sun Belt	T–1st	—	10	3	Won Camellia Bowl vs. Toledo, 31–28	—	—
2017	2017	Scott Satterfield	Sun Belt	T–1st	—	9	4	Won Dollar General Bowl vs. Toledo, 34–0	—	—
2018	2018 (Note: Scott Satterfield resigned as head coach before the New Orleans Bowl to take the head coaching job at Louisville. Mark Ivey was the interim coach for the bowl game.)	Scott Satterfield	Sun Belt	1st	T–1st	11	2	Won New Orleans Bowl vs. Middle Tennessee 45–13	—	—
2019	2019 (Note: Eliah Drinkwitz resigned as head coach before the New Orleans Bowl to take the head coaching job at Missouri. Shawn Clark was hired as head coach prior to the game.)	Eliah Drinkwitz	Sun Belt	1st	T–1st	13	1	Won New Orleans Bowl vs. UAB 31–17	19	18
2020	2020	Shawn Clark	Sun Belt	3rd	2nd	9	3	Won Myrtle Beach Bowl vs. North Texas 56–28	—	—
2021	2021	Shawn Clark	Sun Belt	2nd	1st	10	4	Lost Boca Raton Bowl vs. Western Kentucky 38–59	—	—
2022	2022	Shawn Clark	Sun Belt	—	5th	6	6	Ineligible (Note: Although Appalachian State had a 6–6 record, they were not bowl eligible as they had more than one win against FCS level teams. Only one win against an FCS opponent may count towards bowl eligibility under NCAA rules.)	—	—
2023	2023	Shawn Clark	Sun Belt	—	2nd	9	5	Won Cure Bowl vs. Miami (OH) 13–9	—	—
2024	2024	Shawn Clark	Sun Belt	—	6th	5	6	Ineligible (Note: Appalachain State only played 11 games in the 2024 season due to the home game against the Liberty Flames being canceled in the aftermath of Hurricane Helene.)	—	—
2025	2025	Dowell Loggains	Sun Belt	—	6th	5	8		—	—

== See also ==
- History of Appalachian State Mountaineers football
