= Gene McMurray =

American sports coach (1902–1971)

Biographical details
- Born: July 25, 1902; Huntington, Indiana, U.S.
- Died: January 2, 1971; Oxford, Mississippi, U.S.

Playing career

Football
- 1922–1925: Maryville

Coaching career (HC unless noted)

Football
- 1929–1931: Milligan
- 1932–1946: East Tennessee State

Basketball
- 1933–1947: East Tennessee State

Baseball
- 1934–1937: East Tennessee State

Administrative career (AD unless noted)
- 1929–1932: Milligan

Head coaching record
- Overall: 62–39–11 (football); 90–84 (basketball)

Accomplishments and honors

Championships
- Football; 1 Smoky Mountain (1938)

Jean Gordon "Gene" McMurray (July 25, 1902 – January 2, 1971) was an American football, basketball, and baseball coach. He served as the head football coach at Milligan College—now known as Milligan University—in Milligan College, Tennessee, from 1929 to 1931 and East Tennessee State College—now known as East Tennessee State University—in Johnson City, Tennessee, from 1932 to 1946. McMurray was also the head basketball coach at East Tennessee State from 1933 to 1947.

A native of Huntington, Indiana, McMurray was a graduate of Maryville College in Maryville, Tennessee. He earned a master's degree from Peabody College and Vanderbilt University and a doctorate in physical education from New York University. McMurray resigned from his coaching post at East Tennessee State in 1947 to head the physical education department at the University of Mississippi (Ole Miss). He died on January 2, 1971, in Oxford, Mississippi, after an apparent heart attack.

== Head coaching record ==
=== College football ===
| Year | Team | Overall | Conference | Standing | Bowl/playoffs |
|---|---|---|---|---|---|
Milligan Buffaloes (Smoky Mountain Conference) (1929–1931)
| 1929 | Milligan | 6–1–1 | 3–1–1 | 2nd | |
| 1930 | Milligan | 4–4–1 | 1–2–1 | 5th | |
| 1931 | Milligan | 2–2–4 | 0–1–3 | 6th | |
| Milligan: | | 12–7–6 | 4–4–5 | | |
East Tennessee State Teachers Buccaneers (Smoky Mountain Conference) (1932–1945)
| 1932 | East Tennessee State Teachers | 3–3–1 | 0–2 | 5th | |
| 1933 | East Tennessee State Teachers | 6–1–2 | 3–1–1 | 2nd | |
| 1934 | East Tennessee State Teachers | 3–3–2 | 2–2–1 | T–3rd | |
| 1935 | East Tennessee State Teachers | 5–3 | 4–3 | 2nd | |
| 1936 | East Tennessee State Teachers | 6–2 | 4–3 | 4th | |
| 1937 | East Tennessee State Teachers | 4–5 | 4–4 | 4th | |
| 1938 | East Tennessee State Teachers | 6–2 | 5–1 | 1st | |
| 1939 | East Tennessee State Teachers | 5–3 | 4–2 | T–2nd | |
| 1940 | East Tennessee State Teachers | 4–4 | 3–3 | 3rd | |
| 1941 | East Tennessee State Teachers | 2–5 | 0–3 | 4th | |
| 1942 | No team—World War II | | | | |
| 1943 | No team—World War II | | | | |
| 1944 | No team—World War II | | | | |
| 1945 | No team—World War II | | | | |
East Tennessee State Buccaneers (Independent) (1946)
| 1946 | East Tennessee State | 7–1 | | | |
| East Tennessee State Teachers / East Tennessee State: | | 50–32–5 | 29–24–2 | | |
| Total: | | 62–39–11 | | | |
National championship Conference title Conference division title or championship game berth
