= 1932 East Tennessee State Teachers football team =

American college football season

1932 East Tennessee State Teachers football
- Conference: Smoky Mountain Conference
- Record: 3–3–1 (0–2 Smoky Mountain)
- Head coach: Gene McMurray (1st season)

1932 Smoky Mountain Conference football standings
	Conf.					Overall
Team	W		L		T	W		L		T
Carson–Newman $	3	–	0	–	0	5	–	2	–	1
King	4	–	1	–	0	5	–	2	–	1
Tusculum	3	–	2	–	0	5	–	2	–	0
Maryville (TN)	1	–	2	–	0	4	–	5	–	0
East Tennessee State Teachers	0	–	2	–	0	3	–	3	–	1
Milligan	0	–	4	–	0	0	–	6	–	0
$ – Conference champion

The 1932 East Tennessee State Teachers football team was an American football team that represented East Tennessee State Teacher's College, Johnson City—now known as East Tennessee State University (ETSU)—as a member of the Smoky Mountain Conference in the 1932 college football season. They were led by first-year head coach Gene McMurray, who was a graduate of Maryville College. He was one of few coaches in the South to hold a doctorate. Prior to coaching for the school, he coached at Erwin and Rockwood High Schools, and also spent three years at Milligan College. For the first time since 1928, the Teachers did not have a losing record, finishing 3–3–1. The highlight of the season was a 26–0 victory over Western Carolina.

== Schedule ==
Date	Opponent	Site	Result
October 8	Union (KY)*	Johnson City, TN	W 12–6
October 15	Hiwassee*	Johnson City, TN	L 6–8
October 29	at Western Carolina*	Cullowhee, NC	W 26–0
November 5	Bluefield*	Johnson City, TN	T 6–6
November 12	Rutherford*	Johnson City, TN	W 19–7
November 19	at King	Bristol, TN	L 0–12
November 25	at Tusculum	Greeneville, TN	L 6–7
*Non-conference game
