= 1937 East Tennessee State Teachers Buccaneers football team =

American college football season

1937 East Tennessee State Teachers Buccaneers football
- Conference: Smoky Mountain Conference
- Record: 4–5 (4–4 Smoky Mountain)
- Head coach: Gene McMurray (6th season)
- Captain: Walter Clark

1937 Smoky Mountain Conference football standings
	Conf.					Overall
Team	W		L		T	W		L		T
Carson–Newman $	6	–	0	–	1	7	–	1	–	1
Appalachian State	4	–	0	–	1	8	–	2	–	1
Maryville (TN)	4	–	1	–	0	5	–	2	–	1
East Tennessee State Teachers	4	–	4	–	0	4	–	5	–	0
King	2	–	3	–	1	4	–	6	–	1
Milligan	2	–	3	–	0	5	–	3	–	1
Cumberland (TN)	1	–	4	–	0	2	–	6	–	1
Tusculum	0	–	5	–	2	0	–	5	–	3
Western Carolina	0	–	3	–	1	1	–	6	–	2
$ – Conference champion

The 1937 East Tennessee State Teachers Buccaneers football team was an American football team that represented State Teachers College, Johnson City—now known as East Tennessee State University (ETSU)—as a member of the Smoky Mountain Conference in the 1937 college football season. They were led by sixth-year head coach Gene McMurray. The 1937 team had their first losing season in six years.

== Schedule ==
Date	Opponent	Site	Result	Attendance	Source
September 25	at Morehead State*	Morehead, KY	L 0–19	2,500	
October 2	Western Carolina	Johnson City, TN	W 12–0		
October 9	at King	Bristol Municipal Stadium; Bristol, TN	L 6–7		
October 16	at Appalachian State	College Field; Boone, NC	L 0–28		
October 23	Tusculum	Johnson City, TN	W 19–0		
October 30	at Carson–Newman	Jefferson City, TN	L 0–13		
November 6	Cumberland (TN)	Johnson City, TN	W 7–6		
November 13	Maryville (TN)	Johnson City, TN	W 13–10		
November 25	Milligan	Johnson City, TN	L 6–18		
*Non-conference game
