= List of Appalachian State Mountaineers head football coaches =

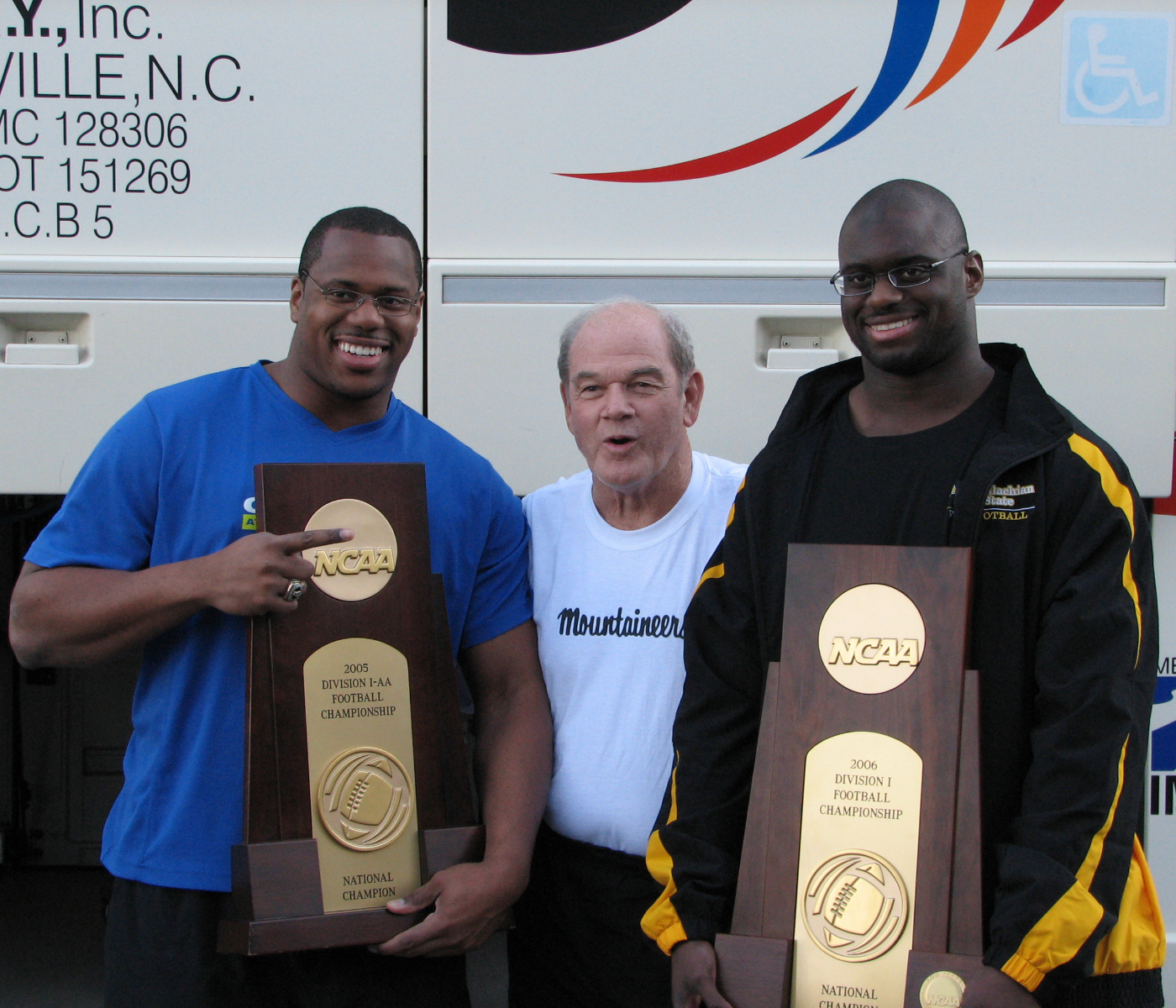
Jerry Moore was the 19th and most successful head football coach in Appalachian State history

This is a complete list of Appalachian State Mountaineers head football coaches. Fielding its first organized football team in 1928, the Appalachian State Mountaineers have had 23 coaches. Flucie Stewart and E. C. Duggins have each served twice as head coach of the Mountaineers. Jerry Moore is the only three-time winner of the American Football Coaches Association (AFCA) Coach of the Year award. Moore also has the most Southern Conference Coach of the Year awards with seven. Scott Satterfield was named as Appalachian's 20th head coach on December 14, 2012. The current head coach of the Mountaineers is Dowell Loggains, who was hired in December 2024. As of the end of the 2025 season, Appalachian State has an all-time record of 674 wins, 368, losses, and 29 ties (.643 all-time winning percentage).

== Key ==
Key to symbols in coaches list
General		Overall		Conference		Postseason (Note: Although the first Rose Bowl Game was played in 1902, it has been continuously played since the 1916 game, and is recognized as the oldest bowl game by the NCAA. "—" indicates any season prior to 1916 when postseason games were not played.)	
No.	Order of coaches (Note: A running total of the number of head coaches, with coaches who served separate tenures being counted only once. Interim head coaches are represented with "Int" and are not counted in the running total. "—" indicates the team played but either without a coach or no coach is on record. "X" indicates an interim year without play.)	GC	Games coached	CW	Conference wins	PW	Postseason wins
DC	Division championships	OW	Overall wins	CL	Conference losses	PL	Postseason losses
CC	Conference championships	OL	Overall losses	CT	Conference ties	PT	Postseason ties
NC	National championships	OT	Overall ties (Note: Overtime rules in college football were introduced in 1996, making ties impossible in the period since.)	C%	Conference winning percentage		
†	Elected to the College Football Hall of Fame	O%	Overall winning percentage (Note: When computing the win–loss percentage, a tie counts as half a win and half a loss.)				

== Coaches ==
List of head football coaches showing season(s) coached, overall records, conference records (Note: Appalachian State has been a member of Sun Belt Conference since the 2014 season.), postseason records, championships and selected awards (Note: Statistics correct as of the end of the 2025 NCAA Division I FBS football season.)
No.	Name	Season(s)	GC	OW	OL	OT	O%	CW	CL	CT	C%	PW	PL	PT	DCs	CCs	NCs	Awards
1	Graydon Eggers	1928	9	3	6	0	0.333	—	—	—	—	—	—	—	—	—	0	—
2	C. B. Johnston	1929–1932	42	26	9	7	0.702	5	1	0	0.833	—	—	—	—	1	0	—
3	Eugene Garbee	1933–1934	17	10	6	1	0.618	2	2	0	0.500	—	—	—	—	0	0	—
4	Kidd Brewer	1935–1938	38	30	5	3	0.829	23	4	2	0.828	0	1	0	—	1	0	—
5	Flucie Stewart	1939; 1946	19	13	4	2	0.737	7	1	1	0.833	0	0	0	—	1	0	—
6	R. W. "Red" Watkins	1940–1941	19	10	9	0	0.526	4	5	0	0.444	0	0	0	—	0	0	—
7	Beattie Feathers^{†}	1942	8	5	2	1	0.688	2	2	0	0.500	0	0	0	—	0	0	—
8	Francis Hoover	1945	7	1	6	0	0.143	1	3	0	0.250	0	0	0	—	0	0	—
9	E. C. Duggins	1947–1950; 1952–1955	85	57	25	3	0.688	40	13	2	0.745	2	5	0	—	3	0	—
10	Pres Mull	1951	9	6	3	0	0.667	3	3	0	0.500	0	0	0	—	0	0	—
11	Bob Broome	1956–1958	29	13	16	0	0.448	9	9	0	0.500	0	0	0	—	0	0	—
12	Bob Breitenstein	1959	10	6	4	0	0.600	5	1	0	0.833	0	0	0	—	0	0	—
13	Jim Duncan	1960–1964	48	31	15	2	0.667	20	6	2	0.750	0	0	0	—	0	0	—
14	Carl Messere	1965–1970	61	34	26	1	0.566	10	10	0	0.500	0	0	0	—	0	0	—
15	Jim Brakefield	1971–1979	99	47	48	4	0.495	19	20	2	0.488	0	0	0	—	0	0	—
16	Mike Working	1980–1982	33	13	18	2	0.424	8	11	2	0.429	0	0	0	—	0	0	—
17	Mack Brown^{†}	1983	11	6	5	0	0.545	4	3	0	0.571	0	0	0	—	0	0	—
18	Sparky Woods	1984–1988	59	38	19	2	0.661	25	9	1	0.729	2	2	0	—	2	0	Southern Conference Coach of the Year (1985, 1986, 1987)
19	Jerry Moore^{†}	1989–2012	302	215	87	0	0.712	146	40	0	0.785	22	15	0	—	10	3 – 2005; 2006; 2007	Eddie Robinson Award(2006); AFCA Football Championship Subdivision Coach of the Year (2005, 2006, 2007); AFCA FCS Regional Coach of the Year (1994, 1995, 2005, 2006, 2008, 2009); Southern Conference Coach of the Year (1991, 1994, 1995, 2005, 2006, 2008, 2009, 2010); Southern Conference Hall of Fame (2014)
20	Scott Satterfield	2013–2018	75	51	24	—	0.680	38	10	—	0.792	3	0	—	1	3	0	Sun Belt Conference Coach of the Year (2018)
Int.	Mark Ivey	2018	1	1	0	—	1.000	0	0	—	–	1	0	—	0	0	0	—
21	Eliah Drinkwitz	2019	13	12	1	—	0.923	8	1	—	0.889	0	0	—	1	1	0	—
22	Shawn Clark	2019–2024	64	40	24	—	0.625	25	15	—	0.625	3	1	—	2	0	0	—
23	Dowell Loggains	2025–present	13	5	8	—	0.385	2	6	—	0.250	0	1	—	0	0	0	—
