= 1936 East Tennessee State Teachers Buccaneers football team =

American college football season

1936 East Tennessee State Teachers Buccaneers football
- Conference: Smoky Mountain Conference
- Record: 6–2 (5–2 Smoky Mountain)
- Head coach: Gene McMurray (5th season)

1936 Smoky Mountain Conference football standings
	Conf.					Overall
Team	W		L		T	W		L		T
Carson–Newman $	7	–	0	–	0	10	–	0	–	0
Appalachian State $	4	–	0	–	0	8	–	1	–	0
Maryville (TN)	4	–	2	–	0	5	–	5	–	0
East Tennessee State Teachers	4	–	3	–	0	5	–	3	–	0
Milligan	3	–	3	–	0	5	–	4	–	0
King	3	–	3	–	0	5	–	5	–	0
Cumberland (TN)	1	–	3	–	0	3	–	6	–	1
Tusculum	0	–	6	–	0	2	–	7	–	0
Western Carolina	0	–	6	–	0	2	–	7	–	0
$ – Conference champion

The 1936 East Tennessee State Teachers Buccaneers football team was an American football team that represented State Teachers College, Johnson City—now known as East Tennessee State University (ETSU)—as a member of the Smoky Mountain Conference in the 1936 college football season. They were led by fifth-year head coach Gene McMurray.

== Schedule ==
Date	Opponent	Site	Result	Source
	Lees–McRae*	Johnson City, TN	W 46–0	
	Western Carolina	Johnson City, TN	W 2–0	
	Carson–Newman	Johnson City, TN	W 2–0	
	King	Johnson City, TN	W 6–0	
October 24	at Tusculum	Greeneville, TN	W 13–0	
	Maryville (TN)	Johnson City, TN	W 2–0	
November 14	Appalachian State	Johnson City, TN	L 7–23	
	Milligan	Johnson City, TN	L 6–7	
*Non-conference game
