= 1933 East Tennessee State Teachers football team =

American college football season

1933 East Tennessee State Teachers football
- Conference: Smoky Mountain Conference
- Record: 6–1–2 (3–1–1 Smoky Mountain)
- Head coach: Gene McMurray (2nd season)
- Captain: Dean Chase Bailey

1933 Smoky Mountain Conference football standings
	Conf.					Overall
Team	W		L		T	W		L		T
Carson–Newman $	6	–	0	–	0	7	–	1	–	0
East Tennessee State Teachers	3	–	1	–	1	6	–	1	–	2
Maryville (TN)	3	–	2	–	0	4	–	5	–	1
Tusculum	1	–	2	–	2	2	–	3	–	2
King	1	–	4	–	0	4	–	6	–	0
Milligan	0	–	4	–	1	2	–	6	–	1
Cumberland (TN)	0	–	1	–	0	7	–	3	–	0
$ – Conference champion

The 1933 East Tennessee State Teachers football team was an American football team that represented East Tennessee State Teacher's College, Johnson City—now known as East Tennessee State University (ETSU)—as a member of the Smoky Mountain Conference in the 1933 college football season. They were led by second-year head coach Gene McMurray. The 1933 team had by far best record of any team in the program's history with a 6–1–2 mark against the "hardest schedule ever attempted by the school".

== Schedule ==
Date	Opponent	Site	Result
September 30	at Union (KY)*	Barbourville, KY	W 14–0
October 6	Morehead State*	Johnson City, TN	W 7–6
October 14	at Carson–Newman	Jefferson City, TN	L 7–20
October 21	at Eastern Kentucky*	Richmond, KY	T 0–0
October 28	Western Carolina*	Johnson City, TN	W 26–0
November 3	Maryville (TN)	Johnson City, TN	W 32–13
November 18	King	Johnson City, TN	W 20–0
November 24	Tusculum	Johnson City, TN	T 6–6
November 30	Milligan	Johnson City, TN	W 19–0
*Non-conference game
