= 1938 East Tennessee State Teachers Buccaneers football team =

American college football season

1938 East Tennessee State Teachers Buccaneers football

Smokey Mountain champion
- Conference: Smoky Mountain Conference
- Record: 6–2 (5–1 Smoky Mountain)
- Head coach: Gene McMurray (7th season)
- Home stadium: College Stadium

1938 Smoky Mountain Conference football standings
	Conf.					Overall
Team	W		L		T	W		L		T
East Tennessee State Teachers $	5	–	1	–	0	6	–	2	–	0
Appalachian State	3	–	0	–	0	9	–	1	–	0
King	3	–	1	–	1	5	–	1	–	3
Carson–Newman	3	–	3	–	1	5	–	4	–	1
Maryville (TN)	3	–	3	–	0	4	–	5	–	1
Milligan	1	–	2	–	2	5	–	3	–	2
Cumberland (TN)	1	–	4	–	0	2	–	8	–	0
Tusculum	0	–	5	–	0	0	–	8	–	1
$ – Conference champion

The 1938 East Tennessee State Teachers Buccaneers football team was an American football team that represented State Teachers College, Johnson City—now known as East Tennessee State University (ETSU)—as a member of the Smoky Mountain Conference in the 1938 college football season. Led by seventh-year head coach Gene McMurray, the Buccaneers compiled an overall record of 6–2 with a mark of 5–1 in conference play, winning the Smoky Mountain Conference title for the first time since joining the conference in 1929. McMurray was assisted by former team captain, Walter Clark.

== Schedule ==
Date	Time	Opponent	Site	Result	Source
September 24		at at Union (KY)*	Barbourville, KY	W 31–13	
September 30		at Cumberland (TN)	Lebanon, TN	W 12–6	
October 8	2:30 p.m.	Eastern Kentucky*	College Stadium; Johnson City, TN	L 0–19	
October 15		King	Johnson City, TN	L 0–7	
October 27		at Tusculum	Greeneville, TN	W 19–6	
November 5		Carson–Newman	Johnson City, TN	W 12–6	
November 11		Maryville (TN)	Johnson City, TN	W 20–13	
November 19		Milligan	Johnson City, TN	W 19–6	
*Non-conference game; All times are in Eastern time
