= 1939 East Tennessee State Teachers Buccaneers football team =

American college football season

1939 East Tennessee State Teachers Buccaneers football
- Conference: Smoky Mountain Conference
- Record: 5–3 (4–2 Smoky Mountain)
- Head coach: Gene McMurray (8th season)
- Home stadium: College Stadium

1939 Smoky Mountain Conference football standings
	Conf.					Overall
Team	W		L		T	W		L		T
Carson–Newman $	4	–	1	–	2	4	–	3	–	2
Milligan	4	–	2	–	0	6	–	3	–	0
East Tennessee State Teachers	4	–	2	–	0	5	–	3	–	0
Maryville (TN)	2	–	3	–	1	4	–	5	–	1
Cumberland (TN)	1	–	5	–	0	2	–	7	–	0
Tusculum	0	–	5	–	0	0	–	7	–	1
Appalachian State *	2	–	0	–	0	7	–	1	–	2
King *	3	–	2	–	1	7	–	3	–	1
$ – Conference champion; * Appalachian State and King were ruled ineligible for conference competition.

The 1939 East Tennessee State Teachers Buccaneers football team was an American football team that represented State Teachers College, Johnson City—now known as East Tennessee State University (ETSU)—as a member of the Smoky Mountain Conference in the 1939 college football season. Led by eighth-year head coach Gene McMurray, the Buccaneers compiled an overall record of 5–3 with a mark of 4–2 in conference play, tying for second place in the Smoky Mountain Conference. King's 19–7 win over East Tennessee State was forfeited to the Buccaneers in December 1939 when the Smokey Mountain Conference commissioner, William O. Lowe, determined that King had used 14 ineligible players in the game.

East Tennessee was ranked at No. 400 in the final Litkenhous Ratings for 1939.

== Schedule ==
Date	Time	Opponent	Site	Result	Attendance	Source
September 22	8:00 p.m.	at Emory and Henry*	Fullerton Field; Emory, VA	L 0–12		
September 30		at Union (KY)*	Barbourville, KY	W 13–7	3,000	
October 7	2:30 p.m.	Cumberland (TN)^{†}	College Stadium; Johnson City, TN	W 8–6	3,000	
October 19	8:00 p.m.	at King	Bristol Municipal Stadium; Bristol, TN	W 7–19 (forfeit win)		
October 25	2:30 p.m.	Tusculum	College Stadium; Johnson City, TN	W 13–6		
November 4		at Carson–Newman	Jefferson City, TN	L 0–13		
November 11		Maryville (TN)	College Stadium; Johnson City, TN	W 20–7		
November 18		Milligan	Johnson City, TN	L 0–14		
*Non-conference game; ^{†}Homecoming; All times are in Eastern time
