= 1935 East Tennessee State Teachers Buccaneers football team =

American college football season

1935 East Tennessee State Teachers Buccaneers football
- Conference: Smoky Mountain Conference
- Record: 5–3 (4–3 Smoky Mountain)
- Head coach: Gene McMurray (4th season)

1935 Smoky Mountain Conference football standings
	Conf.					Overall
Team	W		L		T	W		L		T
Cumberland (TN) $	5	–	0	–	0	7	–	3	–	0
Carson–Newman	6	–	1	–	0	7	–	3	–	0
Appalachian State	3	–	2	–	0	5	–	2	–	2
East Tennessee State Teachers	4	–	3	–	0	5	–	3	–	0
Maryville (TN)	2	–	2	–	1	4	–	5	–	1
Milligan	2	–	3	–	1	2	–	5	–	1
King	1	–	3	–	1	2	–	5	–	2
Tusculum	0	–	5	–	1	2	–	5	–	1
Western Carolina	0	–	4	–	0	1	–	10	–	0
$ – Conference champion

The 1935 East Tennessee State Teachers Buccaneers football team was an American football team that represented State Teachers College, Johnson City—now known as East Tennessee State University (ETSU)—as a member of the Smoky Mountain Conference in the 1935 college football season. They were led by fourth-year head coach Gene McMurray. The 1935 team marks the first time the football team was called the Buccaneers, which McMurray is credited with coining.

== Schedule ==
Date	Opponent	Site	Result	Source
September 28	Lees–McRae*	Johnson City, TN	W 19–0	
October 12	at Carson–Newman	Jefferson City, TN	L 0–12	
October 19	Western Carolina	Johnson City, TN	W 13–0	
October 26	Tusculum	Johnson City, TN	W 19–6	
November 2	at Appalachian State	College Field; Boone, NC	W 19–12	
November 9	Maryville (TN)	Johnson City, TN	L 0–6	
November 16	Cumberland (TN)	Johnson City, TN	L 0–26	
November 28	Milligan	Johnson City, TN	W 9–6	
*Non-conference game
