= 1934 East Tennessee State Teachers football team =

American college football season

1934 East Tennessee State Teachers football
- Conference: Smoky Mountain Conference
- Record: 3–3–2 (2–2–1 Smoky Mountain)
- Head coach: Gene McMurray (3rd season)
- Captain: Dean Pryor Hunt

1934 Smoky Mountain Conference football standings
| | Conf. | | | | | Overall |
| Team | W | | L | | T | W | | L | | T |
|---|---|---|---|---|---|---|---|---|---|---|
| Milligan $ | 3 | – | 1 | – | 1 | 6 | – | 2 | – | 1 |
| Tusculum | 3 | – | 2 | – | 1 | 5 | – | 2 | – | 1 |
| Cumberland (TN) | 1 | – | 1 | – | 0 | 7 | – | 3 | – | 0 |
| King | 2 | – | 2 | – | 1 | 5 | – | 3 | – | 1 |
| Carson–Newman | 2 | – | 2 | – | 2 | 4 | – | 3 | – | 2 |
| East Tennessee State Teachers | 2 | – | 2 | – | 1 | 3 | – | 3 | – | 2 |
| Maryville (TN) | 2 | – | 3 | – | 0 | 4 | – | 6 | – | 0 |
| Appalachian State | 0 | – | 2 | – | 0 | 3 | – | 5 | – | 0 |
$ – Conference champion

The 1934 East Tennessee State Teachers football team was an American football team that represented East Tennessee State Teacher's College, Johnson City—now known as East Tennessee State University (ETSU)—as a member of the Smoky Mountain Conference in the 1934 college football season. They were led by third-year head coach Gene McMurray. The 1934 team had a total of 40 players with 13 returning lettermen. Despite a 3–3–2 record, they finished third in the conference. One of the most memorable moments was the Thanksgiving afternoon game with Milligan before a record-setting crowd at the new Roosevelt Stadium, though East Tennessee lost 14–0. Seniors Pryor Hunt and Lynn Massengill were considered "best players to ever play their positions at T.C." according to Berney Burelson.

== Schedule ==
| Date | Opponent | Site | Result | Source |
|---|---|---|---|---|
| October 5 | King | Johnson City, TN | L 7–12 | |
| October 13 | Carson–Newman | Johnson City, TN | T 6–6 | |
| October 20 | at Western Carolina* | Cullowhee, NC | W 6–2 | |
| October 26 | Maryville (TN) | Johnson City, TN | W 19–6 | |
| November 3 | Union (KY)* | Johnson City, TN | T 0–0 | |
| November 10 | at Morehead State* | Morehead, KY | L 12–13 | |
| November 23 | Tusculum | Johnson City, TN | W 6–0 | |
| November 29 | Milligan | Roosevelt Stadium; Johnson City, TN | L 0–14 | |
*Non-conference game
