= Steve Lacy (coach) =

American college sports coach, educator, and political adviser

Biographical details
- Born: October 24, 1908; Sullivan County, Tennessee, U.S.
- Died: February 3, 2000 (aged 91); Johnson City, Tennessee, U.S.

Playing career

Football
- 1928–1930: Milligan

Basketball
- c. 1930: Milligan
- Position: Guard (basketball)

Coaching career (HC unless noted)

Football
- 1931–1932: Mary Hughes HS (TN)
- 1933–1941: Milligan
- 1942: Milligan (advisory coach)

Basketball
- 1931–1933: Mary Hughes HS (TN)

Baseball
- ?: Milligan

Administrative career (AD unless noted)
- 1931–1933: Mary Hughes HS (TN)
- 1933–1943: Milligan

Head coaching record
- Overall: 45–28–6 (college football)

Accomplishments and honors

Championships
- Football; 2 Smoky Mountain (1934, 1940)

Stephen Barnes Lacy (October 24, 1908 – February 3, 2000) was an American college sports coach, educator, and political adviser. He served as the head football coach at Milligan College—now known as Milligan University—in Milligan College, Tennessee from 1933 to 1942.

A native of Sullivan County, Tennessee, Lacy entered Milligan College in 1927. Even though he had never seen football played before coming to Milligan, he made the varsity Milligan Buffaloes football team in 1928 and was team captain as a senior in 1930. In basketball, Lacy twice earned all-Smoky Mountain Conference honors as a guard, in 1929 and 1930. He graduated from Milligan in 1931 with cum laude honors.

Lacy began his coaching and teaching career at Mary Hughes High School in Piney Flats, Tennessee, where he was athletic director, coach, teacher, and principal for two years. In 1933, he was hired as athletic director and head coach of football and baseball at his alma mater, Milligan.

Lacy, known as "Mr. Democrat", was an influential member of the Tennessee Democratic Party, serving as an adviser to Al Gore, United States Senator and Vice President of the United States, Ned McWherter, Governor of Tennessee, and Jim Sasser, United States Senator. He died on February 3, 2000, at Johnson City Medical Center, in Johnson City, Tennessee.

== Head coaching record ==
=== College football ===
Year	Team	Overall	Conference	Standing	Bowl/playoffs
Milligan Buffaloes (Smoky Mountain Conference) (1933–1941)
1933	Milligan	2–6–1	0–4–1	6th	
1934	Milligan	6–2–1	3–1–1	1st	
1935	Milligan	2–5–1	2–3–1	6th	
1936	Milligan	5–4	3–3	T–5th	
1937	Milligan	5–3–1	2–3	6th	
1938	Milligan	5–3–2	1–2–2	6th	
1939	Milligan	6–3	4–2	T–2nd	
1940	Milligan	9–0	5–0	1st	
1941	Milligan	5–2	2–1	2nd	
Milligan:		45–28–6	22–19–5		
Total:		45–28–6			
National championship Conference title Conference division title or championship game berth
