= 1940 Milligan Buffaloes football team =

American college football season

1940 Milligan Buffaloes football

Smoky Mountain champion
- Conference: Smoky Mountain Conference
- Record: 9–0 (5–0 Smoky Mountain)
- Head coach: Steve Lacy (8th season)
- Home stadium: Roosevelt Stadium

1940 Smoky Mountain Conference football standings
| | Conf. | | | | | Overall |
| Team | W | | L | | T | W | | L | | T |
|---|---|---|---|---|---|---|---|---|---|---|
| Milligan $ | 5 | – | 0 | – | 0 | 9 | – | 0 | – | 0 |
| Carson–Newman | 4 | – | 1 | – | 0 | 4 | – | 4 | – | 0 |
| East Tennessee State Teachers | 3 | – | 3 | – | 0 | 4 | – | 4 | – | 0 |
| Maryville | 2 | – | 3 | – | 0 | 5 | – | 5 | – | 0 |
| Cumberland (TN) | 1 | – | 4 | – | 0 | 1 | – | 9 | – | 0 |
| Tusculum | 0 | – | 4 | – | 0 | 1 | – | 7 | – | 0 |
$ – Conference champion

The 1940 Milligan Buffaloes football team was an American football team that represented Milligan University as a member of the Smoky Mountain Conference during the 1940 college football season. In their eighth year under head coach Steve Lacy, the Buffaloes compiled a perfect 9–0 record (5–0 in conference games), won the Smoky Mountain Conference championship, shut out six of nine opponents, and outscored all opponents by a total of 179 to 33.

Four Milligan players were first-team picks for the 1940 All-Smoky Mountain Conference football team: Big Bill Showalter at fullback; Charlie D'Agata at end; Frank Spraker at tackle; and James Riggs at guard. Three others were named to the second team: Hope Burton at halfback; Hugh Blessing at end; and Fred Dellinger at guard.

The team played its home games at Roosevelt Stadium in Johnson City, Tennessee.

== Schedule ==
| Date | Opponent | Site | Result | Attendance | Source |
|---|---|---|---|---|---|
| September 14 | Austin Peay* | Roosevelt Stadium; Johnson City, TN | W 12–0 | 1,500 | |
| September 20 | at Cumberland (TN) | Lebanon, TN | W 13–0 | | |
| September 28 | East Tennessee State Teachers | Roosevelt Stadium; Johnson City, TN | W 6–0 | | |
| October 4 | Maryville^{†} | Roosevelt Stadium; Johnson City, TN | W 20–6 | 500 | |
| October 19 | Carson–Newman | Roosevelt Stadium; Johnson City, TN | W 19–0 | | |
| October 26 | Emory & Henry* | Roosevelt Stadium; Johnson City, TN | W 34–0 | | |
| November 1 | at Tusculum | Greenville, TN | W 20–0 | | |
| November 8 | King* | Roosevelt Stadium; Johnson City, TN | W 13–6 | 1,500 | |
| November 21 | at Bluefield* | Bluefield, WV | W 42–21 | | |
*Non-conference game; ^{†}Homecoming
