= 1941 East Tennessee State Teachers Buccaneers football team =

American college football season

1941 East Tennessee State Teachers Buccaneers football
- Conference: Smoky Mountain Conference
- Record: 2–5 (0–3 Smoky Mountain)
- Head coach: Gene McMurray (10th season)
- Captains: Buck Hunt; Bill Mitchell

1941 Smoky Mountain Conference football standings
	Conf.					Overall
Team	W		L		T	W		L		T
King $	1	–	0	–	1	5	–	3	–	1
Milligan	2	–	1	–	0	5	–	2	–	0
Carson–Newman	2	–	1	–	1	3	–	5	–	1
East Tennessee State Teachers	0	–	3	–	0	2	–	5	–	0
$ – Conference champion

The 1941 East Tennessee State Teachers Buccaneers football team was an American football team that represented State Teachers College, Johnson City—now known as East Tennessee State University (ETSU)—as a member of the Smoky Mountain Conference during the 1941 college football season. Led by tenth-year head coach Gene McMurray, the Buccaneers compiled an overall record of 2–5 with a mark of 0–3 in conference play, placing last out of four teams in the Smoky Mountain Conference. Jim Mooney, the head baseball coach, stepped in to assist with the football team. Buck Hunt and Bill Mitchell served as team co-captains. East Tennessee State did not field another football team until 1946, after the end of World War II.

== Schedule ==
Date	Opponent	Site	Result
September 20	at Emory and Henry*	Emory, VA	L 0–6
September 27	Milligan	Johnson City, TN	L 0–26
October 4	Carson–Newman	Johnson City, TN	L 0–7
October 11	Emory and Henry*	Johnson City, TN	W 8–6
October 17	Tusculum*	Johnson City, TN	W 13–9
October 25	Carson–Newman	Johnson City, TN	L 0–18
November 8	Maryville (TN)*	Johnson City, TN	L 0–13
*Non-conference game
