= 1937 Appalachian State Mountaineers football team =

American college football season

1937 Appalachian State Mountaineers football

NSC champion

Doll & Toy Charity Game, L 0–7 vs. Mississippi State Teachers
- Conference: North State Conference, Smoky Mountain Conference
- Record: 8–1–1 (5–0 NSC, 4–0–1 SMC)
- Head coach: Kidd Brewer (3rd season)
- Home stadium: College Field

1937 North State Conference football standings
	Conf.					Overall
Team	W		L		T	W		L		T
Appalachian State $	5	–	0	–	0	8	–	1	–	1
Elon	3	–	1	–	0	7	–	1	–	0
Catawba	3	–	2	–	0	8	–	2	–	0
Lenoir Rhyne	2	–	3	–	0	4	–	5	–	2
Western Carolina	0	–	3	–	0	1	–	6	–	2
Guilford	0	–	3	–	0	1	–	7	–	0
$ – Conference champion

1937 Smoky Mountain Conference football standings
	Conf.					Overall
Team	W		L		T	W		L		T
Carson–Newman $	6	–	0	–	1	7	–	1	–	1
Appalachian State	4	–	0	–	1	8	–	2	–	1
Maryville (TN)	4	–	1	–	0	5	–	2	–	1
East Tennessee State Teachers	4	–	4	–	0	4	–	5	–	0
King	2	–	3	–	1	4	–	6	–	1
Milligan	2	–	3	–	0	5	–	3	–	1
Cumberland (TN)	1	–	4	–	0	2	–	6	–	1
Tusculum	0	–	5	–	2	0	–	5	–	3
Western Carolina	0	–	3	–	1	1	–	6	–	2
$ – Conference champion

The 1937 Appalachian State Mountaineers football team was an American football team that represented Appalachian State Teachers College (now known as Appalachian State University) as a member of the North State Conference and the Smoky Mountain Conference during the 1937 college football season. In their third year under head coach Kidd Brewer, the Mountaineers compiled an overall record of 8–1–1, with a mark of 5–0 in NSC and 4–0–1 in SMC conference play. Appalachian State was NSC champion and lost to Mississippi State Teachers at the Doll & Toy Charity Game.

== Schedule ==
Date	Opponent	Site	Result	Source
September 24	Cumberland (TN)	College Field; Boone, NC	W 39–0	
October 1	at Lenoir Rhyne	Moretz Stadium; Hickory, NC	W 12–0	
October 9	Carson–Newman	College Field; Boone, NC	T 0–0	
October 16	East Tennessee State	College Field; Boone, NC	W 28–0	
October 23	Elon	College Field; Boone, NC	W 31–0	
October 29	at Tusculum	Pioneer Field; Tusculum, TN	W 37–0	
November 6	at Western Carolina	Cullowhee, NC (rivalry)	W 14–0	
November 13	at Guilford	Greensboro, NC	W 37–0	
November 19	vs. Catawba	Moretz Stadium; Hickory, NC	W 6–0	
December 3	vs. Mississippi State Teachers*	Gulfport, MS (Doll & Toy Charity Game)	L 0–7	
*Non-conference game
