= 1934 Appalachian State Mountaineers football team =

American college football season

1934 Appalachian State Mountaineers football
- Conference: North State Conference, Smoky Mountain Conference
- Record: 3–5 (1–0 NSC, 0–2 SMC)
- Head coach: Eugene Garbee (2nd season)
- Home stadium: College Field

1934 North State Conference football standings
| | Conf. | | | | | Overall |
| Team | W | | L | | T | W | | L | | T |
|---|---|---|---|---|---|---|---|---|---|---|
| Elon $ | 3 | – | 0 | – | 1 | 6 | – | 2 | – | 1 |
| Catawba | 2 | – | 0 | – | 2 | 5 | – | 2 | – | 3 |
| Appalachian State * | 1 | – | 0 | – | 0 | 3 | – | 4 | – | 1 |
| Lenoir Rhyne | 2 | – | 1 | – | 1 | 5 | – | 4 | – | 1 |
| Guilford | 1 | – | 3 | – | 0 | 2 | – | 7 | – | 0 |
| Western Carolina | 0 | – | 5 | – | 0 | 3 | – | 7 | – | 0 |
$ – Conference champion; * – Appalachian State was ineligible for championship because of limited conference schedule.

1934 Smoky Mountain Conference football standings
| | Conf. | | | | | Overall |
| Team | W | | L | | T | W | | L | | T |
|---|---|---|---|---|---|---|---|---|---|---|
| Milligan $ | 3 | – | 1 | – | 1 | 6 | – | 2 | – | 1 |
| Tusculum | 3 | – | 2 | – | 1 | 5 | – | 2 | – | 1 |
| Cumberland (TN) | 1 | – | 1 | – | 0 | 7 | – | 3 | – | 0 |
| King | 2 | – | 2 | – | 1 | 5 | – | 3 | – | 1 |
| Carson–Newman | 2 | – | 2 | – | 2 | 4 | – | 3 | – | 2 |
| East Tennessee State Teachers | 2 | – | 2 | – | 1 | 3 | – | 3 | – | 2 |
| Maryville (TN) | 2 | – | 3 | – | 0 | 4 | – | 6 | – | 0 |
| Appalachian State | 0 | – | 2 | – | 0 | 3 | – | 5 | – | 0 |
$ – Conference champion

The 1934 Appalachian State Mountaineers football team was an American football team that represented Appalachian State Teachers College (now known as Appalachian State University) as a member of the North State Conference and the Smoky Mountain Conference during the 1934 college football season. In their second year under head coach Eugene Garbee, the Mountaineers compiled an overall record of 3–5, with marks of 1–0 against North State opponents and 0–2 in Smoky Mountain Conference play.

== Schedule ==
| Date | Opponent | Site | Result | Source |
|---|---|---|---|---|
| September 28 | at Milligan | Cherokee Field; Elizabethton, TN | L 0–12 | |
| October 5 | Erskine* | College Field; Boone, NC | L 0–2 | |
| October 13 | Western Carolina^{†} | College Field; Boone, NC (rivalry) | W 6–0 | |
| October 20 | East Carolina* | College Field; Boone, NC | W 27–6 | |
| October 26 | at South Georgia Teachers* | Statesboro, GA (rivalry) | L 13–22 | |
| November 3 | at Concord State* | Athens, WV | L 6–20 | |
| November 17 | Tusculum | College Field; Boone, NC | L 0–10 | |
| November 23 | at Southern College* | Lakeland, FL | W 7–6 | |
*Non-conference game; ^{†}Homecoming
