= 1935 Appalachian State Mountaineers football team =

American college football season

1935 Appalachian State Mountaineers football
- Conference: North State Conference, Smoky Mountain Conference
- Record: 5–2–2 (1–0–1 NSC, 3–2 SMC)
- Head coach: Kidd Brewer (1st season)
- Home stadium: College Field

1935 North State Conference football standings
	Conf.					Overall
Team	W		L		T	W		L		T
Elon $	3	–	0	–	0	6	–	3	–	0
Appalachian State	1	–	0	–	1	5	–	2	–	2
Catawba	3	–	1	–	0	8	–	2	–	0
Lenoir Rhyne	2	–	2	–	1	4	–	4	–	1
Guilford	1	–	3	–	0	1	–	9	–	0
Western Carolina	0	–	4	–	0	1	–	10	–	0
$ – Conference champion

1935 Smoky Mountain Conference football standings
	Conf.					Overall
Team	W		L		T	W		L		T
Cumberland (TN) $	5	–	0	–	0	7	–	3	–	0
Carson–Newman	6	–	1	–	0	7	–	3	–	0
Appalachian State	3	–	2	–	0	5	–	2	–	2
East Tennessee State Teachers	4	–	3	–	0	5	–	3	–	0
Maryville (TN)	2	–	2	–	1	4	–	5	–	1
Milligan	2	–	3	–	1	2	–	5	–	1
King	1	–	3	–	1	2	–	5	–	2
Tusculum	0	–	5	–	1	2	–	5	–	1
Western Carolina	0	–	4	–	0	1	–	10	–	0
$ – Conference champion

The 1935 Appalachian State Mountaineers football team was an American football team that represented Appalachian State Teachers College (now known as Appalachian State University) as a member of the North State Conference and the Smoky Mountain Conference during the 1935 college football season. In their first year under head coach Kidd Brewer, the Mountaineers compiled an overall record of 5–2–2, with a marks of 1–0–1 against North State opponents and 0–2 in Smoky Mountain Conference play.

== Schedule ==
Date	Opponent	Site	Result	Source
September 27	at Lenoir Rhyne	Moretz Stadium; Hickory, NC	T 0–0	
October 5	Piedmont*	College Field; Boone, NC	W 13–0	
October 12	Cumberland (TN)	College Field; Boone, NC	L 7–26	
October 18	at Milligan	Cherokee Field; Elizabethton, TN	W 20–13	
October 26	at Western Carolina	Cullowhee, NC (rivalry)	W 12–0	
November 2	East Tennessee State	College Field; Boone, NC	L 12–19	
November 9	South Georgia Teachers*	College Field; Boone, NC (rivalry)	T 0–0	
November 16	at Tusculum	Pioneer Field; Tusculum, TN	W 6–0	
November 23	at East Carolina*	Greenville, NC	W 14–6	
*Non-conference game
