= 1938 Appalachian State Mountaineers football team =

American college football season

1938 Appalachian State Mountaineers football
- Conference: North State Conference, Smoky Mountain Conference
- Record: 9–1 (3–1 NSC, 3–0 SMC)
- Head coach: Kidd Brewer (4th season)
- Home stadium: College Field

1938 North State Conference football standings
	Conf.					Overall
Team	W		L		T	W		L		T
Catawba +	4	–	1	–	0	7	–	2	–	1
Elon +	4	–	1	–	0	6	–	3	–	0
Appalachian State	3	–	1	–	0	9	–	1	–	0
Lenoir Rhyne	4	–	2	–	0	4	–	3	–	2
Guilford	0	–	3	–	1	1	–	5	–	2
High Point	0	–	4	–	1	2	–	4	–	1
Western Carolina	0	–	3	–	0	0	–	7	–	1
+ – Conference co-champions

1938 Smoky Mountain Conference football standings
	Conf.					Overall
Team	W		L		T	W		L		T
East Tennessee State Teachers $	5	–	1	–	0	6	–	2	–	0
Appalachian State	3	–	0	–	0	9	–	1	–	0
King	3	–	1	–	1	5	–	1	–	3
Carson–Newman	3	–	3	–	1	5	–	4	–	1
Maryville (TN)	3	–	3	–	0	4	–	5	–	1
Milligan	1	–	2	–	2	5	–	3	–	2
Cumberland (TN)	1	–	4	–	0	2	–	8	–	0
Tusculum	0	–	5	–	0	0	–	8	–	1
$ – Conference champion

The 1938 Appalachian State Mountaineers football team was an American football team that represented Appalachian State Teachers College (now known as Appalachian State University) as a member of the North State Conference and the Smoky Mountain Conference during the 1938 college football season. In their fourth year under head coach Kidd Brewer, the Mountaineers compiled an overall record of 9–1, with a mark of 3–1 in NSC and 3–0 in SMC conference play.

== Schedule ==
Date	Opponent	Site	Result	Source
October 1	Newberry*	College Field; Boone, NC	W 7–0	
October 8	at Carson–Newman	Jefferson City, TN	W 26–0	
October 15	High Point	College Field; Boone, NC	W 41–2	
October 21	vs. Elon	World War Memorial Stadium; Greensboro, NC	L 6–7	
October 29	Western Carolina	College Field; Boone, NC (rivalry)	W 27–0	
November 5	Tusculum	College Field; Boone, NC	W 67–0	
November 11	at Lenoir Rhyne	Moretz Stadium; Hickory, NC	W 7–0	
November 19	at East Carolina*	Greenville, NC	W 18–6	
November 24	at Cumberland (TN)	Lebanon, TN	W 22–0	
December 3	vs. Moravian*	Bowman Gray Stadium; Winston-Salem, NC	W 20–0	
*Non-conference game
