= 1941 King Tornado football team =

American college football season

1941 King Tornado football

Smoky Mountain champion
- Conference: Smoky Mountain Conference
- Record: 5–3–1 (1–0–1 Smoky Mountain)
- Head coach: Jack Young (4th season)
- Home stadium: Bristol Municipal Stadium

1941 Smoky Mountain Conference football standings
	Conf.					Overall
Team	W		L		T	W		L		T
King $	1	–	0	–	1	5	–	3	–	1
Milligan	2	–	1	–	0	5	–	2	–	0
Carson–Newman	2	–	1	–	1	3	–	5	–	1
East Tennessee State Teachers	0	–	3	–	0	2	–	5	–	0
$ – Conference champion

The 1941 King Tornado football team represented King College—now known as King University as a member of the Smoky Mountain Conference during the 1941 college football season. Led by Jack Young in his fourth and final season as head coach, the Tornado compiled an overall record of 5–3–1 with a mark of 1–0–1 in conference play, winning the Smoky Mountain Conference title. King played home games at Bristol Municipal Stadium in Bristol, Tennessee.

King Tornado football was suspended during World War II and never resumed after the war.

== Schedule ==
Date	Time	Opponent	Site	Result	Attendance	Source
September 20	8:00 p.m.	Concord*	Bristol Municipal Stadium; Bristol, TN	L 6–7		
September 26	8:30 p.m.	at Catawba*	Shuford Field; Salisbury, NC	W 14–6	1,200	
October 4		at Appalachian State*	College Field; Boone, NC	W 15–2		
October 11		Maryville (TN)*	Bristol Municipal Stadium; Bristol, TN	W 35–0		
October 18	2:00 p.m.	at Eastern Kentucky*	Hanger Stadium; Richmond, KY	L 0–21		
November 1		Roanoke*^{†}	Bristol Municipal Stadium; Bristol, TN	W 14–0		
November 8	8:15 p.m.	Milligan	Bristol Municipal Stadium; Bristol, TN	W 20–0		
November 14	8:00 p.m.	at Elon*	Elon, NC	L 0–13		
November 27	2:30 p.m.	Carson–Newman	Bristol Municipal Stadium; Bristol, TN	T 0–0		
*Non-conference game; ^{†}Homecoming; All times are in Eastern time
