= 1936 Appalachian State Mountaineers football team =

American college football season

1936 Appalachian State Mountaineers football
- Conference: North State Conference, Smoky Mountain Conference
- Record: 8–1 (3–1 NSC, 4–0 SMC)
- Head coach: Kidd Brewer (2nd season)
- Home stadium: College Field

1936 North State Conference football standings
	Conf.					Overall
Team	W		L		T	W		L		T
Elon $	3	–	0	–	0	6	–	5	–	0
Appalachian State	3	–	1	–	0	5	–	2	–	2
Catawba	3	–	2	–	0	5	–	5	–	0
Lenoir Rhyne	2	–	3	–	0	3	–	6	–	1
Western Carolina	1	–	2	–	0	2	–	7	–	0
Guilford	0	–	4	–	0	2	–	7	–	0
$ – Conference champion

1936 Smoky Mountain Conference football standings
	Conf.					Overall
Team	W		L		T	W		L		T
Carson–Newman $	7	–	0	–	0	10	–	0	–	0
Appalachian State $	4	–	0	–	0	8	–	1	–	0
Maryville (TN)	4	–	2	–	0	5	–	5	–	0
East Tennessee State Teachers	4	–	3	–	0	5	–	3	–	0
Milligan	3	–	3	–	0	5	–	4	–	0
King	3	–	3	–	0	5	–	5	–	0
Cumberland (TN)	1	–	3	–	0	3	–	6	–	1
Tusculum	0	–	6	–	0	2	–	7	–	0
Western Carolina	0	–	6	–	0	2	–	7	–	0
$ – Conference champion

The 1936 Appalachian State Mountaineers football team was an American football team that represented Appalachian State Teachers College (now known as Appalachian State University) as a member of the North State Conference and the Smoky Mountain Conference during the 1936 college football season. In their second year under head coach Kidd Brewer, the Mountaineers compiled an overall record of 8–1, with a mark of 3–1 in NSC and 4–0 in SMC conference play.

== Schedule ==
Date	Opponent	Site	Result	Source
September 26	Piedmont*	College Field; Boone, NC	W 105–0	
October 3	at Lenoir Rhyne	Moretz Stadium; Hickory, NC	W 14–0	
October 10	Guilford	College Field; Boone, NC	W 52–0	
October 17	Western Carolina	College Field; Boone, NC (rivalry)	W 20–2	
October 24	South Georgia Teachers*	College Field; Boone, NC (rivalry)	W 27–0	
October 31	Tusculum	College Field; Boone, NC	W 45–0	
November 6	at Catawba	Shuford Stadium; Salisbury, NC	L 0–14	
November 14	at East Tennessee State	Johnson City, TN	W 23–7	
November 20	at Cumberland (TN)	Lebanon, TN	W 10–6	
*Non-conference game
