= 1933 Appalachian State Mountaineers football team =

American college football season

1933 Appalachian State Mountaineers football
- Conference: North State Conference
- Record: 7–2 (1–0 NSC)
- Head coach: Eugene Garbee (1st season)
- Home stadium: College Field

1933 North State Conference football standings
	Conf.					Overall
Team	W		L		T	W		L		T
Elon $	2	–	0	–	1	5	–	3	–	1
Appalachian State	1	–	0	–	0	7	–	2	–	0
Lenoir Rhyne	2	–	1	–	1	3	–	3	–	3
Catawba	1	–	1	–	1	2	–	5	–	2
Guilford	1	–	1	–	1	2	–	7	–	1
Western Carolina	0	–	4	–	0	1	–	7	–	1
$ – Conference champion

The 1933 Appalachian State Mountaineers football team was an American football team that represented Appalachian State Teachers College (now known as Appalachian State University) as a member of the North State Conference during the 1933 college football season. In their first year under head coach Eugene Garbee, the Mountaineers compiled an overall record of 7–2, with a mark of 1–0 in conference play.

== Schedule ==
Date	Opponent	Site	Result	Source
September 22	at Erskine*	Due West, SC	L 7–13	
September 29	at Milligan*	A.B.G.A.A. Field; Elizabethton, TN	W 13–0	
October 7	Glenville State*	College Field; Boone, NC	L 7–14	
October 14	at Western Carolina	Cullowhee, NC (rivalry)	W 15–0	
October 21	Piedmont*	College Field; Boone, NC	W 44–0	
October 28	vs. King*	Memorial Stadium; Asheville, NC	W 14–0	
November 4	Concord State*	College Field; Boone, NC	W 12–0	
November 17	at Tusculum*	Pioneer Field; Tusculum, TN	W 20–3	
November 24	at East Carolina*	Greenville, NC	W 14–0	
*Non-conference game
