= 1940 East Tennessee State Teachers Buccaneers football team =

American college football season

1940 East Tennessee State Teachers Buccaneers football
- Conference: Smoky Mountain Conference
- Record: 4–4 (3–3 Smoky Mountain)
- Head coach: Gene McMurray (9th season)
- Captains: Bud Carpenter; Frank Parsely

1940 Smoky Mountain Conference football standings
	Conf.					Overall
Team	W		L		T	W		L		T
Milligan $	5	–	0	–	0	9	–	0	–	0
Carson–Newman	4	–	1	–	0	4	–	4	–	0
East Tennessee State Teachers	3	–	3	–	0	4	–	4	–	0
Maryville	2	–	3	–	0	5	–	5	–	0
Cumberland (TN)	1	–	4	–	0	1	–	9	–	0
Tusculum	0	–	4	–	0	1	–	7	–	0
$ – Conference champion

The 1940 East Tennessee State Teachers Buccaneers football team was an American football team that represented State Teachers College, Johnson City—now known as East Tennessee State University (ETSU)—as a member of the Smoky Mountain Conference during the 1940 college football season. Led by ninth-year head coach Gene McMurray, the Buccaneers compiled an overall record of 4–4 with a mark of 3–3 in conference play, placing third in the Smoky Mountain Conference. Bud Carpenter and Frank Parsely were named co-captains for the year. The team played Carson–Newman and Emory and Henry each twice, losing both games to Carson-Newman and splitting with Emory and Henry.

East Tennessee State was ranked at No. 461 (out of 697 college football teams) in the final rankings under the Litkenhous Difference by Score system for 1940.

== Schedule ==
Date	Opponent	Site	Result
September 21	Emory and Henry*	Johnson City, TN	L 14–19
September 28	Milligan	Johnson City, TN	L 0–6
October 5	Carson–Newman	Johnson City, TN	L 6–16
October 12	at Emory and Henry*	Emory, VA	W 13–7
October 19	at Tusculum	Greeneville, TN	W 13–0
October 26	at Maryville (TN)	Maryville, TN	W 6–0
November 2	Carson–Newman	Johnson City, TN	L 0–12
November 9	Cumberland (TN)	Johnson City, TN	W 13–0
*Non-conference game
