= Steve Lacy (disambiguation) =

Steve Lacy (born 1998) is an American singer-songwriter, guitarist, and record producer.

Steve Lacy may also refer to:

- Steve Lacy (coach) (1908–2000), American college sports coach, educator, and political adviser
- Steve Lacy (saxophonist) (1934–2004), American jazz saxophonist and composer
- Steve Lacy (businessman) (born 1954), American magazine and media company executive
- Steve Lacy (runner) (born 1956), American Olympic athlete

== See also ==
- Stephen Lacey (disambiguation)
