= Emmanuel Christian Seminary =

Theological seminary of Milligan University

Emmanuel Christian Seminary at Milligan (formerly Emmanuel School of Religion) is the graduate theological seminary of Milligan University. The school is located near Johnson City, Tennessee, United States in Elizabethton, Tennessee city limits and in the community of Milligan. The seminary was founded in 1965 as a freestanding institution, though closely related to Milligan University, but became one of the graduate schools of the university in July 2015. It was founded by church leaders and scholars within the Christian churches and churches of Christ and the Christian Church (Disciples of Christ) who recognized the need for a seminary rooted in the heritage of the Stone-Campbell wing of the Reformed tradition while still engaging in theological preparation for ministers. The seminary's campus is located on a hill overlooking the Appalachian Mountains of northeast Tennessee.

The school offers four degrees: the Master of Theological Studies (M.T.S.), the Master Arts in Christian Ministries (M.A.C.M.), the Master of Divinity (M.Div.), and the Doctor of Ministry (D.Min.). It is accredited by the Southern Association of Colleges and Schools and the Association of Theological Schools in the United States and Canada to award masters and doctoral degrees. Support for the school comes primarily from churches and individuals related to the Stone-Campbell tradition who believe in the school's mission of ministerial preparation. It has long enjoyed a strong relationship with all three streams of the movement to which it is related and has produced pastors, scholars, and leaders for all three streams as well as for the wider church.

Emmanuel has graduated alumni serving in colleges and seminaries across the United States and worldwide. The majority of Emmanuel's graduates serve as ministers in contexts such as parish pastors, professors, missionaries, campus ministers, children and youth ministers, church planters, and chaplains in hospitals and the military.

== Campus ==
Emmanuel's main building, the B.D. Phillips Memorial building is located at the top of a hill that overlooks the Milligan University campus and the Appalachian Mountains. It is in the Phillips Memorial Building that students attend classes and chapel. The building also contains Emmanuel's library of over 181,000 volumes, and which houses the Restoration Archives, a collection of materials chronicling the history and theology of the Stone-Campbell wing of the Reformed tradition. The administrative offices are located on the first floor.

The Thompson Community Center is located within walking distance of the main building. The Thompson Center has lodging available for guests who wish to stay on campus. Students study in the Fife Fireside Room or in the Ashworth Alumni Hall. The Itha Pratt Conference Room houses seminar and conference rooms. The offices of the Emmanuel Institutes, which host seminars and continuing education classes for ministers throughout the year, are also located here.

The Emmanuel Village is the on-campus housing for students and their families. The village consists of 42 "English cottage" style townhomes within walking distance of the classrooms. The Delno Brown Walking Trail and the Dana Gohn Prayer Garden are nearby, as is a children's playground. The Algrhim Carriage House is the campus maintenance facility in the Village.

== Student body ==
The student body is composed of approximately 110 students, mostly pursuing master's degrees and many coming from the Christian Churches and Churches of Christ, the Christian Church (Disciples of Christ), and the Churches of Christ, though an increasing number of students from the Episcopal Church, Presbyterian Church (U.S.A.), Baptist Churches, and the United Methodist Church have studied there in recent years.

== Bibliography ==
- Foster, DA; Blowers, Paul; Dunnavant, AL; et al., eds. (2012), The Encyclopedia of the Stone-Campbell Movement, William B Eerdmans, ISBN 978-0-8028-6975-3
