= John Preston McConnell =

John Preston McConnell (February 22, 1866 – October 13, 1941) was born in Scott County, Virginia. Before serving as Radford University's first president from 1911 to 1937, McConnell had served for nine years as dean and professor of history and economics at Emory and Henry College.

He received both his Bachelor and Master of Arts degrees from Milligan College and pursued his Ph.D. at the University of Virginia. He met and married his wife, Clara Louise Lucas, while at Milligan. Though his beliefs were unfashionable at the time, McConnell was a strong supporter of the need for quality education for women. His career at Radford was marked by efforts to ensure equal access to information, courses and materials for female students. McConnell Library, bearing his name, is a testament to his undying quest for excellent facilities on Radford's campus. McConnell was an ordained minister in the Christian Church (Disciples of Christ) and served as one of the pastors of First Christian Church (Disciples of Christ) in Radford, just across the street from the main administration building of the university. His views on the equality of genders were deeply rooted in his faith. He died on 13 October 1941 in Henrico County, Virginia at the age of 75, and was buried in Fairlawn, Pulaski, Virginia, United States.

Information courtesy of Radford University:
