= Warren Eugene Brandon =

California painter and photographer

Warren Eugene Brandon (November 2, 1916 – September 11, 1977) was a California painter and photographer who was born in San Francisco.

== Biography ==
California Field Workers, oil on canvas painting by Warren Eugene Brandon

He studied art at Milligan College and with Jack Davis, Ralph Ledesma, Jack Feldman, Raymond Brose, and Eliot O'Hara. In the 1950s and 1960s, he cruised the Pacific Ocean on the Matson Line teaching on ships, as well as in Hawaii. Other than this, Brandon was a lifelong resident of San Francisco. In 1964, he was one of four Americans named "Life Fellows" of Britain's Royal Society of Artists, and thereafter appended "FRSA" to his signature. Brandon founded the San Francisco Artist Cooperative. He committed suicide in San Francisco on September 11, 1977.
