= Nasir Player =

American football player (born 1997)

Profile
- Position: Defensive end

Personal information
- Born: March 29, 1997 (age 29)
- Listed height: 6 ft 5 in (1.96 m)
- Listed weight: 271 lb (123 kg)

Career information
- High school: Ridge View HS (Columbia, South Carolina)
- College: East Tennessee State (2015-2019)
- NFL draft: 2020: undrafted

Career history
- Tampa Bay Buccaneers (2020)*; Alphas (2021); Pittsburgh Maulers (2022–2023); Michigan Panthers (2024)*; Memphis Showboats (2025)
- * Offseason or practice squad member only

Nasir Player (born March 29, 1997) is an American professional football defensive end. He played college football for the East Tennessee State Buccaneers.

== Early life ==
Player grew up in Germany and returned to the US when he was twelve. Player attended high school at Ridge View High School. He didn't play on the varsity football team until his senior year, where he had 88 tackles and nine sacks. He also played one season of lacrosse.

== College career ==
Player played college football for the East Tennessee State Buccaneers. He redshirted the 2015 season. In the 2016 season, he played in nine games starting seven, recording 27 tackles and one sack while being selected to the Southern Conference All-Freshman Team. In his sophomore season, he started 11 games, totaling 67 tackles and seven sacks; he was selected First Team All-SoCon.

In his junior season, he played and started in 11 games, during which he recorded 43 tackles and seven sacks. He was awarded with First Team All-SoCon Defense. In the 2019 season, he played 12 games and started in 11, recording 45 tackles and 4.5 sacks. He was again selected First Team All-SoCon.

== Professional career ==
=== Tampa Bay Buccaneers ===
Player went undrafted in the 2020 NFL draft. He signed as an undrafted free agent with the Tampa Bay Buccaneers on April 30, 2020. In August 2020, he was waived, along with wide receiver Spencer Schnell. He played in the 2021 The Spring League season for The Alphas.

=== Pittsburgh Maulers ===
Player was drafted in the 2022 USFL draft in the third round by the Pittsburgh Maulers. He played for the Maulers in the 2022 USFL season and 2023 USFL season. In November 2024, he re-signed for the 2024 season, but the Maulers were folded after the USFL and XFL merger a month later.

=== Michigan Panthers ===
Player was chosen in the 2024 UFL dispersal draft by the Michigan Panthers. He was waived on March 23, 2024, as part of the final roster cuts.

=== Memphis Showboats ===
In November 2024, he signed to the Memphis Showboats with Eli Walker, with whom he played two seasons at Pittsburgh.
