= Stephen Lacey =

Steve, Steven or Stephen Lacey may refer to:

- Stephen Lacey, rediscoverer of the Comb sort algorithm
- Steve Lacey, singer in Gold City
- Steven Lacey, racing driver in the 2012 Australian Sports Sedan season
- Steve Lacey (sailor), see Soling North American Championship results (1980–1989) etc.

== See also ==
- Steve Lacy (disambiguation)
