= 1945 Appalachian State Mountaineers football team =

American college football season

1945 Appalachian State Mountaineers football
- Conference: North State Conference
- Record: 1–6 (1–3 NSC)
- Head coach: Francis Hoover (1st season)
- Home stadium: College Field

1945 North State Conference football standings
| | Conf. | | | | | Overall |
| Team | W | | L | | T | W | | L | | T |
|---|---|---|---|---|---|---|---|---|---|---|
| High Point + | 5 | – | 0 | – | 0 | 5 | – | 0 | – | 1 |
| Catawba + | 2 | – | 0 | – | 0 | 10 | – | 1 | – | 0 |
| Appalachian State | 1 | – | 3 | – | 0 | 1 | – | 6 | – | 0 |
| Western Carolina | 0 | – | 2 | – | 0 | 1 | – | 3 | – | 0 |
| Guilford | 0 | – | 3 | – | 0 | 0 | – | 7 | – | 0 |
+ – Conference co-champions

The 1945 Appalachian State Mountaineers football team was an American football team that represented Appalachian State Teachers College (now known as Appalachian State University) as a member of the North State Conference during the 1945 college football season. In their only year under head coach Francis Hoover, the Mountaineers compiled an overall record of 1–6, with a mark of 1–3 in conference play, and finished 3rd in the NSC.

== Schedule ==
| Date | Opponent | Site | Result | Source |
|---|---|---|---|---|
| September 28 | at Milligan* | Roosevelt Field; Elizabethton, TN | L 7–26 | |
| October 13 | Milligan* | College Field; Boone, NC | L 7–9 | |
| October 20 | Oak Ridge Military Police* | College Field; Boone, NC | L 7–27 | |
| October 27 | High Point | College Field; Boone, NC | L 12–13 | |
| November 3 | at Guilford | Greensboro, NC | W 7–6 | |
| November 10 | vs. Catawba | Bowman Gray Stadium; Winston-Salem, NC | L 0–55 | |
| November 17 | at High Point | Albion Millis Stadium; High Point, NC | L 13–31 | |
*Non-conference game
