= 1940 Appalachian State Mountaineers football team =

American college football season

1940 Appalachian State Mountaineers football
- Conference: North State Conference
- Record: 6–4 (2–2 NSC)
- Head coach: R. W. "Red" Watkins (1st season)
- Home stadium: College Field

1940 North State Conference football standings
	Conf.					Overall
Team	W		L		T	W		L		T
Catawba $	4	–	0	–	0	8	–	1	–	0
Elon	5	–	1	–	0	5	–	2	–	1
Lenoir Rhyne	4	–	2	–	0	6	–	3	–	0
Appalachian State	2	–	2	–	0	6	–	4	–	0
High Point	2	–	3	–	0	5	–	4	–	1
Western Carolina	1	–	4	–	0	2	–	5	–	1
Guilford	0	–	6	–	0	0	–	9	–	0
$ – Conference champion

The 1940 Appalachian State Mountaineers football team was an American football team that represented Appalachian State Teachers College (now known as Appalachian State University) as a member of the North State Conference during the 1940 college football season. In their first year under head coach R. W. "Red" Watkins, the Mountaineers compiled an overall record of 6–4, with a mark of 2–2 in conference play, and finished 4th in the NSC.

Appalachian was ranked at No. 279 (out of 697 college football teams) in the final rankings under the Litkenhous Difference by Score system for 1940.

== Schedule ==
Date	Opponent	Site	Result	Source
September 14	Tampa*	College Field; Boone, NC	W 13–6	
September 21	at North Carolina*	Kenan Memorial Stadium; Chapel Hill, NC	L 6–56	
September 28	at Carson–Newman*	Jefferson City, TN	W 23–6	
October 5	Elon	College Field; Boone, NC	L 0–7	
October 11	at Western Carolina	Cullowhee, NC (rivalry)	W 40–8	
October 19	Newberry*	College Field; Boone, NC	W 9–7	
October 25	King*	College Field; Boone, NC	W 28–3	
November 2	at Rollins*	Orlando Stadium; Orlando, FL	L 0–30	
November 8	at Lenoir Rhyne	Moretz Stadium; Hickory, NC	L 9–13	
November 15	vs. Guilford	Morganton, NC	W 28–0	
*Non-conference game
