= Eugene Garbee =

American sports coach and college administrator (1907–1996)

- Garbee pictured in The Rhododendron 1942, Appalachian State yeabook

Biographical details
- Born: May 29, 1907; Billings, Missouri, U.S.
- Died: November 8, 1996 (aged 89); Winslow, Arizona, U.S.

Playing career

Football
- 1929–1930: Southwest Missouri State

Coaching career (HC unless noted)

Football
- 1933–1934: Appalachian State

Basketball
- 1934–1935: Appalachian State

Administrative career (AD unless noted)
- 1933–1934: Appalachian State

Head coaching record
- Overall: 10–6–1 (football); 8–11 (basketball)

Eugene Emmett Garbee (May 29, 1907 – November 8, 1996) was an American football and basketball coach and college administrator. He was the third head football coach and the first head basketball coach at Appalachian State Teachers College—now known as Appalachian State University—located in Boone, North Carolina.

Garbee was born on May 29, 1907, in Billings, Missouri. He graduated from Southwest Missouri State Teacher's College–now known as Missouri State University–in 1931 with a bachelor's degree. He later earned a master's degree from George Peabody College—now Peabody College, a division of Vanderbilt University—and a doctorate from New York University. He taught health and physical education at Drake University from 1949 to 1952. Garbee was president of Upper Iowa University from 1952 to 1970. He died on November 8, 1996, in Winslow, Arizona.

== Head coaching record ==
=== Football ===
Year	Team	Overall	Conference	Standing	Bowl/playoffs
Appalachian State Mountaineers (North State Conference) (1933)
1933	Appalachian State	7–2	1–0	2nd	
Appalachian State Mountaineers (North State Conference / Smoky Mountain Conference) (1933)
1934	Appalachian State	3–4–1	1–0 / 0–2	3rd / 8th	
Appalachian State:		10–6–1	2–2		
Total:		10–6–1			

=== Basketball ===
Record table
Season	Team	Overall	Conference	Standing	Postseason
Appalachian State Mountaineers (North State Conference) (1934–1935)
1934–35	Appalachian State	8–11			
Total:		8–11			
