= 1941 Appalachian State Mountaineers football team =

American college football season

1941 Appalachian State Mountaineers football
- Conference: North State Conference
- Record: 4–5 (2–3 NSC)
- Head coach: R. W. "Red" Watkins (2nd season)
- Home stadium: College Field

1941 North State Conference football standings
	Conf.					Overall
Team	W		L		T	W		L		T
Elon $	6	–	0	–	0	8	–	1	–	0
Catawba	4	–	1	–	0	8	–	3	–	0
Lenoir Rhyne	3	–	3	–	0	4	–	6	–	0
Western Carolina	2	–	2	–	0	3	–	5	–	0
Appalachian State	2	–	3	–	0	4	–	5	–	0
High Point	1	–	5	–	0	2	–	7	–	0
Guilford	0	–	4	–	0	0	–	7	–	0
$ – Conference champion

The 1941 Appalachian State Mountaineers football team was an American football team that represented Appalachian State Teachers College (now known as Appalachian State University) as a member of the North State Conference during the 1941 college football season. In their second year under head coach R. W. "Red" Watkins, the Mountaineers compiled an overall record of 4–5, with a mark of 2–3 in conference play, and finished 4th in the NSC.

== Schedule ==
Date	Opponent	Site	Result	Source
September 19	at Newberry*	Setzler Field; Newberry, SC	W 14–12	
September 27	Arkansas A&M*	College Field; Boone, NC	W 67–0	
October 4	King*	College Field; Boone, NC	L 2–15	
October 11	Western Carolina	College Field; Boone, NC (rivalry)	W 35–0	
October 18	vs. Catawba	Bowman Gray Stadium; Winston-Salem, NC	L 19–20	
October 24	at Lenoir Rhyne	Moretz Stadium; Hickory, NC	L 6–20	
November 7	at Tampa*	Phillips Field; Tampa, FL	L 6–10	
November 15	at High Point	Albion Millis Stadium; High Point, NC	W 26–0	
November 27	at Elon	Burlington Memorial Stadium; Burlington, NC	L 6–26	
*Non-conference game
