= Kidd Brewer =

American football player, coach, and administrator (1908–1991)

- Kidd Brewer pictured in The Rhododendron 1936, Appalachian State yearbook

Biographical details
- Born: May 5, 1908; Winston-Salem, North Carolina, U.S.
- Died: November 22, 1991 (aged 83); Raleigh, North Carolina, U.S.

Playing career
- 1929–1931: Duke
- Positions: Quarterback, fullback

Coaching career (HC unless noted)
- 1935–1938: Appalachian State

Administrative career (AD unless noted)
- 1935–1938: Appalachian State

Head coaching record
- Overall: 30–5–3
- Bowls: 0–1

Accomplishments and honors

Championships
- 1 North State (1937)

Pierce Oliver "Kidd" Brewer (May 5, 1908 – November 22, 1991) was an American football player, coach, and college athletics administrator. He served as the head football coach and athletic director at Appalachian State Teachers College—now known as Appalachian State University—from 1935 to 1938. Brewer's 1937 football squad went unbeaten and unscored upon during the regular season, outscoring their opponents 206–0. Brewer was an All-American at Duke University before coaching at Appalachian. Kidd Brewer Stadium, Appalachian State's home football venue, was named in his honor on September 3, 1988.

After leaving the Mountaineers, Brewer started a sales career before enlisting in the United States Navy during World War II. After the war Brewer served as secretary and administrative assistant to United States Senators Josiah Bailey and William B. Umstead, respectively. He gained significant wealth by purchasing land that was used later for roads. In 1963, Brewer was sentenced to 18 months in state prison for bid rigging.

He ran for Lieutenant Governor of North Carolina in 1956 and for Governor in 1964, losing in the Democratic Party primary each time.

== Property ownership ==
In the 1960s, Brewer purchased a large parcel of land in Raleigh. Part of the land was sold to developers who built Crabtree Mall and KiddsHill Plaza. A large 8000 square foot home was built on the rest of the land became Kidd Brewer's place of residence until the 1980s. He named it Belle Acres after his mother, even though friends teased him by calling it Belly Achers.

In its heyday, KiddsHill Plaza featured several stores including Brendles, Pizza Hut, Steak and Ale, and Food Lion. In 1995, Brendles went out of business and that building continued to be used over the next decade for various purposes including a mail order warehouse and a church on Sunday mornings. In 2003, a developer purchased KiddsHill Plaza and terminated all of the leases of the tenants except for Pizza Hut and Steak and Ale. However, following these closures, the Pizza Hut closed due to lackluster sales and the Steak and Ale closed after the franchise filed for bankruptcy. With all of the buildings vacated, the land developer tore them all down and planned on replacing them with an elaborate new shopping center in its place. However, after the destruction of KiddsHill Plaza, the recession hit and it has since become an undeveloped lot that has changed hands several times over the years. As of Summer 2016, the land appears to finally be on track to be built into a blend of condos and shops.

In the 1980s, Belle Acres became Crossroads Restaurant, which was a popular place for high schoolers to take prom dates to. In the late 1990s, Crossroads closed and it became Prime Only Steakhouse. At some point before 2006, Prime Only moved to a new location and Belle Acres became an unoccupied building. It was rumored to be inhabited by vagrants during this time. In 2006, it caught fire and the concrete skeletal foundation was all that remained. For many years, there was speculation that it would eventually get torn down to make way for a shopping center. In late 2013, this became a reality and the remains of Belle Acres got bulldozed. As of summer 2016, the new shopping center is in progress.

== Family ==
Brewer's son, Pierce Oliver "Kidd" Brewer Jr., was a professional diver, who appeared in the James Cameron films Piranha II: The Spawning and The Abyss. The younger Brewer committed suicide in May 1990. The special edition of The Abyss is dedicated to his memory.

== Head coaching record ==
| Year | Team | Overall | Conference | Standing | Bowl/playoffs |
|---|---|---|---|---|---|
Appalachian State Mountaineers (North State Conference / Smoky Mountain Conference) (1935–1938)
| 1935 | Appalachian State | 5–2–2 | 1–0–1 / 3–2 | 2nd / 3rd | |
| 1936 | Appalachian State | 8–1 | 3–1 / 4–0 | 2nd / 2nd | |
| 1937 | Appalachian State | 8–1–1 | 5–0 / 4–0–1 | 1st / 2nd | L Doll and Toy Charity Game |
| 1938 | Appalachian State | 9–1 | 3–1 / 3–0 | 3rd / 2nd | |
| Appalachian State: | | 30–5–3 | 23–4–2 | | |
| Total: | | 30–5–3 | | | |
National championship Conference title Conference division title or championship game berth
