= East Tennessee State Buccaneers football =

Intercollegiate American football team

2026 East Tennessee State Buccaneers football team
- First season: 1920; 106 years ago
- Athletic director: Richard Sander
- Head coach: Will Healy; 1st season, 7–5 (.583)
- Location: Johnson City, Tennessee
- Stadium: William B. Greene Jr. Stadium (capacity: 7,694)
- NCAA division: Division I FCS
- Conference: Southern
- Colors: Navy blue and gold
- All-time record: 399–463–27 (.464)
- Bowl record: 4–2 (.667)

Conference championships
- Smoky Mountain: 1938 OVC: 1962, 1969 SoCon: 2018, 2021
- Rivalries: Chattanooga (rivalry); Western Carolina (rivalry)
- Mascot: Bucky
- Website: etsubucs.com/football

The East Tennessee State Buccaneers football program is the intercollegiate American football team for East Tennessee State University (ETSU) located in Johnson City, Tennessee. The team was dormant from the end of the 2003 season until being reinstated for the 2015 season. They played all of their 2015 home games and all but one of their 2016 home games at Kermit Tipton Stadium before the opening of the new William B. Greene Jr. Stadium for the 2017 season. The remaining 2016 home game, against Western Carolina on September 17, was played at nearby Bristol Motor Speedway, which was already set up for football due to a game the prior week between the University of Tennessee and Virginia Tech. Before ETSU dropped football, it competed in NCAA Division I as a Southern Conference (SoCon) football program. The revived program played as an independent in 2015 before returning to the SoCon in 2016.

== History ==
East Tennessee State Normal School fielded its first football team in 1920. Navy blue and old gold, chosen in 1911, were the school colors. The team only played five games that year including two against local high school teams. W.R. Windes was the head coach for the first two seasons. In 1925, the school's name was changed to East Tennessee State Teachers College. The athletic teams were named "The Teachers". John Robinson was the head coach for the next 5 years.

In 1930, the school's name changed again to State Teachers College, Johnson City. In 1932, Gene McMurray was named the head coach. He coached for 10 straight seasons until the school stopped playing due to World War II. He came back to coach the team in 1946. His winning percentage during his 11 seasons was the highest in the history of Buc football. During his tenure, the team won the Smoky Mountain Conference championship in 1938 and the team's name changed to the "Buccaneers" (1935).

In 1943, the school's name changed to East Tennessee State College. In 1952, Star Wood became head coach. He led the team for 13 seasons; 1952 to 1953 and then 1955 to 1965. Coach Wood tops the list of total wins with 64. From 1952 to 1956, the team made five consecutive appearances in the Burley Bowl, compiling a 3–2 record. East Tennessee State College joined the Ohio Valley Conference in 1957.

In 1963, the college gained university status to become East Tennessee State University. Coach John Robert Bell led the team to a 10–0–1 record in 1969. They won the Ohio Valley Conference Championship and defeated Louisiana Tech, led by quarterback Terry Bradshaw, in the Grantland Rice Bowl. The Memorial Center opened in 1977 and was nicknamed the "Mini-Dome". The football team played their homes games indoors until the program was discontinued. In 1978, ETSU joined the Southern Conference.

The 1996 ETSU football team led by Coach Mike Cavan had a record of 10–3 and participated for the first time in the NCAA Division I-AA playoffs, defeating Villanova in a first-round game.

In 2003, ETSU decided to discontinue the football team due to financial reasons. The last game was played at home on November 22, 2003, against The Citadel. ETSU won the game 16–13 with a last second field goal. The school further left the Southern Conference.

On January 29, 2013, the Student Government Association voted 22–5 to a $125 per semester fee increase that would fund the re-instatement of the football program. University President Dr. Brian Noland, who was in attendance for the vote, said that fee would be sufficient to support football and Title IX requirements that support additional women's athletics. Noland crafted a football proposal to submit to the Tennessee Board of Regents (TBR). The Regents passed it in March 2013.

On March 29, 2013, the TBR approved a $125 fee increase to reinstate football at ETSU. It had also become widely known across the campus that the Mini-Dome would not host home games. ETSU built a brand new football stadium to play host to all of its home games. On May 30, 2013, ETSU accepted an invitation to rejoin the Southern Conference in 2014 and reinstated football, with operations beginning shortly thereafter and the first class signed in 2014 in preparation for the first game in the 2015 season.

=== The Carl Torbush era ===
Veteran coach Carl Torbush was chosen to helm the rebuilding of the program, and signed the first class in 2014 in preparation for the 2015 season debut. For the first two years, they played home games at Kermit Tipton Stadium/Steve Spurrier Field located on the campus of Science Hill High School in Johnson City. It was announced on February 6, 2015, that ETSU would play Tennessee at Neyland Stadium on September 8, 2018, the first meeting between the two schools. ETSU will receive a $500,000 payment for the game. The Carl Torbush era began on September 3, 2015, as the Bucs took on the Kennesaw State Owls. On July 15, 2015, it was announced that the first game against Kennesaw State and the homecoming game against Emory & Henry had sold out, and that standing-only tickets were then available. Torbush and the fledgling Bucs finished the 2015 season with a 2–9 record, with the wins over Warner and Kentucky Wesleyan. Torbush then lead a much improved Bucs team to a 5–6 (2–6 SoCon) in 2016 including a revenge win against Kennesaw State, a win over Western Carolina at Bristol Motor Speedway (the most attended game in the program's history), and an upset against then 18th-ranked Samford. In 2017, the Bucs returned on campus to William B. Greene Jr. Stadium, where they were mostly successful. However, the Bucs finished with a disappointing 4–7 record. After the season, Torbush decided to retire on December 8, 2017, citing his age as key factor in not signing a contract In three years as the Buccaneers head coach, Torbush finished with an 11–22 (4–12 SoCon) record.

=== The Randy Sanders era ===
On December 17, 2017, following the retirement of Carl Torbush earlier in the month, the East Tennessee State Buccaneers named, former Florida State Seminoles football offensive coordinator, Randy Sanders as their eighteenth head coach. On September 1, 2018, Sanders won his first game as a head coach defeating Mars Hill 28–7. On September 4, 2021, Sanders led the Buccaneers to their first FBS win since 1987, defeating Vanderbilt 23–3. The season ended with a loss to North Dakota State in the Quarterfinals.

== Conference history ==
=== Classifications ===
- 1952–1956: NAIA
- 1957–1972: NCAA College Division
- 1973–1977: NCAA Division II
- 1978–2003: NCAA Division I–AA (now FCS)
- 2004–2014: No team
- 2015–present: NCAA Division I FCS

=== Conference memberships ===
- 1920–1929, 1946–1948: Independent
- 1930–1941, 1949–1951: Smoky Mountain Conference
- 1949–1957: Volunteer State Athletic Conference
- 1957–1978: Ohio Valley Conference
- 1979–2003: Southern Conference
- 2004–2014: No team
- 2015: FCS independent
- 2016–present: Southern Conference

Note: ETSU was a full member of the Southern Conference in the 2015–16 school year, but played the 2015 football season as an FCS independent.

== Conference championships ==
The Buccaneers have won five conference championships, with one coming in the Smoky Mountain Conference, two in the Ohio Valley Conference and two in the Southern Conference.

Season	Conference	Coach	Overall record	Conference record
1938	Smoky Mountain Conference	Gene McMurray	6–2	5–1
1962†	Ohio Valley Conference	Star Wood	8–2	4–2
1969	Ohio Valley Conference	John Robert Bell	10–0–1	6–0–1
2018†	Southern Conference	Randy Sanders	8–4	6–2
2021	Southern Conference	Randy Sanders	11–1	7–1

† Co-champions

== Division I-AA/FCS Playoffs results ==
The Buccaneers have appeared in the I-AA/FCS playoffs three times with an overall record of 2–3.

Year	Round	Opponent	Result
1996	First Round; Quarterfinals	Villanova; Montana	W 35–29; L 14–44
2018	First Round	Jacksonville State	L 27–34
2021	Second Round; Quarterfinals	Kennesaw State; North Dakota State	W 32–31; L 3–27

== Notable former players ==
Notable alumni include:

- Donnie Abraham
- Nate Adkins
- Chris Beatty
- Jorge Cimadevilla
- Jamey Chadwell
- Mack Cummings
- Dave Ewart
- Earl Ferrell
- Thane Gash
- Austin Herink
- Alijah Huzzie
- Steven Jackson
- Maurice Kelly
- Jerry Kirk
- Dennis Law
- George Litton
- Jerry Mynatt
- Steve Parker
- Nasir Player
- Dalton Ponchillia
- Marcus Satterfield
- Jacob Saylors
- Gerald Sensabaugh
- Dainon Sidney
- Sam Streiter
- Mike Smith
- Tony Tiller
- Jack Vest
- Van Williams

== Yearly results ==
Year	Coach	Win	Loss	Tie	Pct.	PF	PA	Delta
1920	William R. Windes	3	2	0	.600	18	85	-67
1921	William R. Windes	4	3	0	.571	95	137	-42
1922	James Karl Luck	6	3	0	.667	142	152	-10
1923	James Karl Luck	3	6	0	.333	105	343	-238
1924	James Karl Luck	3	4	1	.437	79	158	-79
1925	John Robinson	3	4	0	.428	57	109	-52
1926	John Robinson	3	4	1	.437	65	163	-98
1927	John Robinson	1	7	0	.125	26	162	-136
1928	John Robinson	4	3	0	.571	65	113	-48
1929	John Robinson	2	5	1	.312	31	116	-85
1930	Jack S. Batey	0	7	0	.000	13	161	-148
1931	Jack S. Batey	1	4	2	.285	42	106	-64
1932	Gene McMurray	3	3	1	.500	74	56	18
1933	Gene McMurray	6	1	2	.778	131	45	86
1934	Gene McMurray	4	3	1	.562	56	47	9
1935	Gene McMurray	5	3	0	.625	80	68	12
1936	Gene McMurray	5	3	0	.625	82	32	50
1937	Gene McMurray	5	5	0	.500	77	107	-30
1938	Gene McMurray	6	2	0	.750	112	75	37
1939	Gene McMurray	5	3	0	.625	61	83	-22
1940	Gene McMurray	4	4	0	.500	65	61	4
1941	Gene McMurray	2	5	0	.285	21	85	-64
1946	Gene McMurray	7	1	0	.875	125	56	69
1947	Loyd Roberts	5	4	0	.555	148	130	18
1948	Loyd Roberts	6	2	1	.722	98	73	25
1949	Loyd Roberts	5	4	0	.555	125	135	-10
1950	Loyd Roberts	3	5	1	.389	126	125	1
1951	Loyd Roberts	4	5	0	.444	115	148	-33
1952	Star Wood	5	2	2	.667	188	125	63
1953	Star Wood	5	4	0	.555	220	164	56
1954	Hal Littleford	5	4	1	.550	165	160	5
1955	Star Wood	6	3	1	.650	145	111	34
1956	Star Wood	4	5	0	.444	108	133	-25
1957	Star Wood	5	6	0	.454	160	151	9
1958	Star Wood	5	4	0	.555	133	120	13
1959	Star Wood	6	3	0	.667	135	119	16
1960	Star Wood	3	4	2	.444	126	120	6
1961	Star Wood	3	7	0	.300	136	214	-78
1962	Star Wood	7	3	0	.700	182	102	80
1963	Star Wood	7	2	0	.777	167	121	46
1964	Star Wood	5	5	0	.500	135	139	-4
1965	Star Wood	2	6	1	.277	129	208	-79
1966	John Robert Bell	3	6	0	.333	112	119	-7
1967	John Robert Bell	3	6	1	.350	133	145	-12
1968	John Robert Bell	5	5	0	.500	151	170	-19
1969	John Robert Bell	10	0	1	.954	219	114	105
1970	John Robert Bell	7	1	2	.800	161	81	80
1971	John Robert Bell	0	9	1	.050	108	242	-134
1972	John Robert Bell	3	7	0	.300	203	221	-18
1973	Roy Frazier	4	7	0	.363	244	263	-19
1974	Roy Frazier	4	6	1	.409	125	152	-27
1975	Roy Frazier	2	8	1	.227	157	239	-82
1976	Roy Frazier	3	7	0	.300	112	204	-92
1977	Roy Frazier	3	8	0	.272	233	356	-123
1978	Jack Carlisle	4	7	0	.363	230	272	-42
1979	Jack Carlisle	7	4	0	.636	278	150	128
1980	Jack Carlisle	2	9	0	.181	144	250	-106
1981	Jack Carlisle	6	5	0	.545	191	242	-51
1982	Jack Carlisle	2	9	0	.181	123	217	-94
1983	Buddy Sasser	3	8	0	.272	173	178	-5
1984	Buddy Sasser	6	5	0	.545	144	167	-23
1985	Mike Ayers	0	10	1	.045	150	271	-121
1986	Mike Ayers	6	5	0	.545	264	266	-2
1987	Mike Ayers	5	6	0	.454	232	244	-12
1988	Don Riley	3	8	0	.272	180	363	-183
1989	Don Riley	4	7	0	.363	218	325	-107
1990	Don Riley	2	9	0	.181	240	330	-90
1991	Don Riley	1	10	0	.090	183	396	-213
1992	Mike Cavan	5	6	0	.454	219	313	-94
1993	Mike Cavan	5	6	0	.454	213	222	-9
1994	Mike Cavan	6	5	0	.545	306	266	40
1995	Mike Cavan	4	7	0	.363	224	305	-81
1996	Mike Cavan	10	3	0	.769	378	286	92
1997	Paul Hamilton	7	4	0	.636	340	242	98
1998	Paul Hamilton	4	7	0	.363	269	340	-71
1999	Paul Hamilton	6	5	0	.545	272	251	21
2000	Paul Hamilton	6	5	0	.545	282	267	15
2001	Paul Hamilton	6	5	0	.545	193	226	-33
2002	Paul Hamilton	4	8	0	.333	167	286	-119
2003	Paul Hamilton	5	7	0	.416	270	233	37
2015	Carl Torbush	2	9	0	.182	180	416	-236
2016	Carl Torbush	5	6	0	.454	174	308	-134
2017	Carl Torbush	4	7	0	.363	211	313	-102
2018	Randy Sanders	8	4	0	.667	312	304	8
2019	Randy Sanders	3	9	0	.250	-	-	-
2020	Randy Sanders	4	2	0	.666	126	113	13
2021	Randy Sanders	11	2	0	.846	425	295	130
2022	George Quarles	3	8	0	.272	323	336	-13
2023	George Quarles	3	8	0	.272	200	350	-150
2024	Tre Lamb	7	5	0	.583	331	250	81
2025	Will Healy	7	5	0	.583	390	346	44
Total		385	456	27	.459	14702	17055	-2353

== Future non-conference opponents ==
Future non-conference opponents announced as of June 26, 2026.

2026	2027	2028	2029	2031
Campbell	at Campbell	at Murray State	Virginia–Wise	at Liberty
Tusculum	at Florida State			
at North Carolina				
West Georgia				
