= Francis Hoover =

American sports coach and administrator

- Hoover pictured in The Rhododendron 1946, Appalachian State yearbook

Biographical details
- Born: November 15, 1914; Statesville, North Carolina, U.S.
- Died: March 19, 2002 (aged 87); Boone, North Carolina, U.S.

Coaching career (HC unless noted)

Football
- 1945: Appalachian State

Basketball
- 1945–1946: Appalachian State
- 1947–1957: Appalachian State

Baseball
- 1948: Appalachian State

Administrative career (AD unless noted)
- 1960–1961: NAIA (president)

Head coaching record
- Overall: 1–6 (football); 133–128 (basketball)

Accomplishments and honors

Championships
- Basketball; 2 North State regular season (1948, 1950)

Awards
- Basketball; North State Coach of the Year (1950)

Francis Lentz Hoover (November 15, 1914 – March 19, 2002) was an American college sports coach and administrator. He coached American football, basketball, baseball, and tennis at Appalachian State Teachers College—now known as Appalachian State University—located in Boone, North Carolina. Hoover was the eighth head football coach, serving for one season in 1945, and the seventh basketball coach, serving for 11 seasons between 1945 and 1957, at Appalachian State. He led the Appalachian State Mountaineers men's basketball to two North State Conference championships. Hoover was the president of the National Association of Intercollegiate Athletics (NAIA) for the 1960–61 academic year.

== Early life and education ==
Hoover has a bachelor of science from Appalachian State, masters of arts from the University of North Carolina and a doctorate from Indiana University.

== Head coaching record ==
=== Football ===
Year	Team	Overall	Conference	Standing	Bowl/playoffs
Appalachian State Mountaineers (North State Conference) (1945)
1945	Appalachian State	1–6	1–3	3rd	
Appalachian State:		1–6	1–3		
Total:		1–6			

=== Basketball ===
Record table
Season	Team	Overall	Conference	Standing	Postseason
Appalachian State Mountaineers (North State Conference) (1945–1946)
1945–46	Appalachian State	11–8			
Appalachian State Mountaineers (North State Conference) (1947–1957)
1947–48	Appalachian State	20–8			
1948–49	Appalachian State	14–6			
1949–50	Appalachian State	21–9			
1950–51	Appalachian State	16–8			
1951–52	Appalachian State	18–6			
1952–53	Appalachian State	5–18			
1953–54	Appalachian State	4–20			
1954–55	Appalachian State	12–12			
1955–56	Appalachian State	8–13			
1956–57	Appalachian State	4–20			
Appalachian State:		133–128	91–87		
Total:		133–128			
National champion Postseason invitational champion Conference regular season champion Conference regular season and conference tournament champion Division regular season champion Division regular season and conference tournament champion Conference tournament champion
