= R. W. "Red" Watkins =

American sports coach, college athletics administrator

- Watkins pictured in The Rhododendron 1947, Appalachian State yearbook

Biographical details
- Born: February 28, 1905; Forsyth County, North Carolina, U.S.
- Died: July 2, 1985 (aged 80); Raleigh, North Carolina, U.S.

Coaching career (HC unless noted)

Football
- 1940–1941: Appalachian State

Baseball
- 1934–1940: Appalachian State

Administrative career (AD unless noted)
- 1940–1941: Appalachian State

Head coaching record
- Overall: 10–9 (football)

Robert Williams "Red" Watkins (February 28, 1905 – July 2, 1985) was an American football and baseball coach and college athletics administrator. He was the sixth head football coach at Appalachian State Teachers College—now Appalachian State University—located in Boone, North Carolina, serving from 1940 to 1941 and compiling a record of 10–9. Watkins was also the head baseball coach at Appalachian State from 1934 to 1940 and the school's athletic director from 1940 to 1941. He died in 1985.

== Head coaching record ==
=== Football ===
Year	Team	Overall	Conference	Standing	Bowl/playoffs
Appalachian State Mountaineers (North State Conference) (1940–1941)
1940	Appalachian State	6–4	2–2	4th	
1941	Appalachian State	4–5	2–3	5th	
Appalachian State:		10–9	4–5		
Total:		10–9			
