= Milligan College, Tennessee =

Unincorporated community in Tennessee, US

Coordinates: 36°18′08″N 82°17′44″W

Milligan College (also known as Milligan) is an unincorporated community and an area of Elizabethton, in Carter County, Tennessee. Milligan is home to Milligan University and Emmanuel Christian Seminary. All of Milligan has been annexed by the city of Elizabethton.

== Postal service ==
Milligan has its own post office and zip code, which is 37682. The post office is located at the corner of Bowers Boulevard and Neth Drive on the college campus.

== Education ==
Milligan is home to Milligan University and Emmanuel Christian Seminary. Happy Valley Elementary School, Happy Valley Middle School, and Happy Valley High School are all a few minutes from Milligan.
