= Milligan University =

Christian university in Milligan College, Tennessee, USA

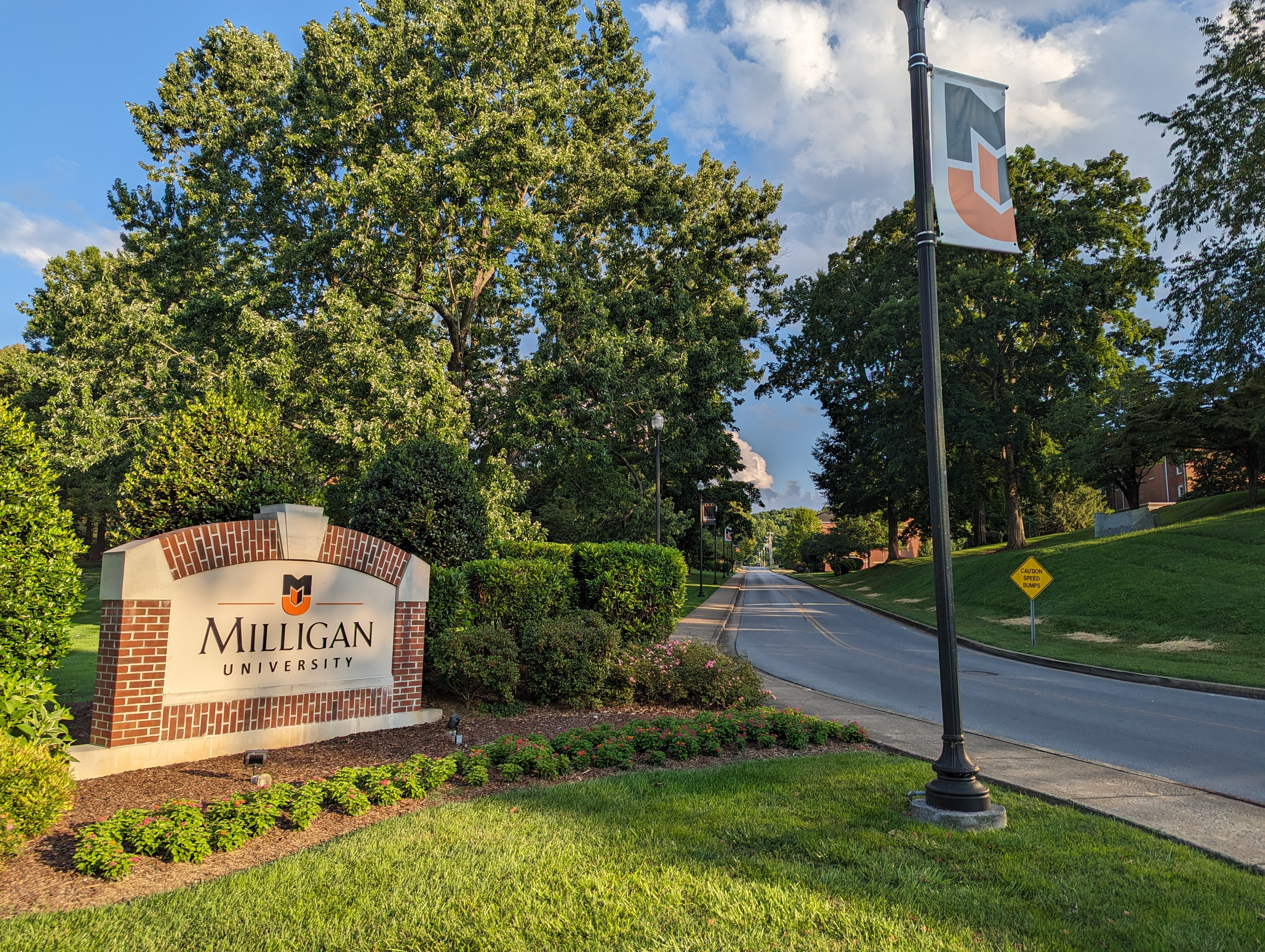
- Milligan University, 2023
- Former names: Buffalo Male and Female Institute (1866–1881); Milligan College (1881–2020)
- Motto: Ago Deo Fideo Et Amore
- Motto in English: Go with God in Faith and Love
- Type: Private university
- Established: 1866
- Religious affiliation: Restoration Movement
- Endowment: $60.3 million (2025)
- President: Stephen Waers
- Faculty: 96 Full-time and 59 Part-time (Spring 2022)
- Administrative staff: 94
- Students: 1,105
- Undergraduates: 755
- Postgraduates: 350
- Location: Milligan College, Tennessee, U.S. 36.3017°N 82.2951°W
- Campus: Suburban
- Colors: Black & Orange
- Nickname: Buffaloes
- Sporting affiliations: NAIA – Appalachian
- Website: milligan.edu
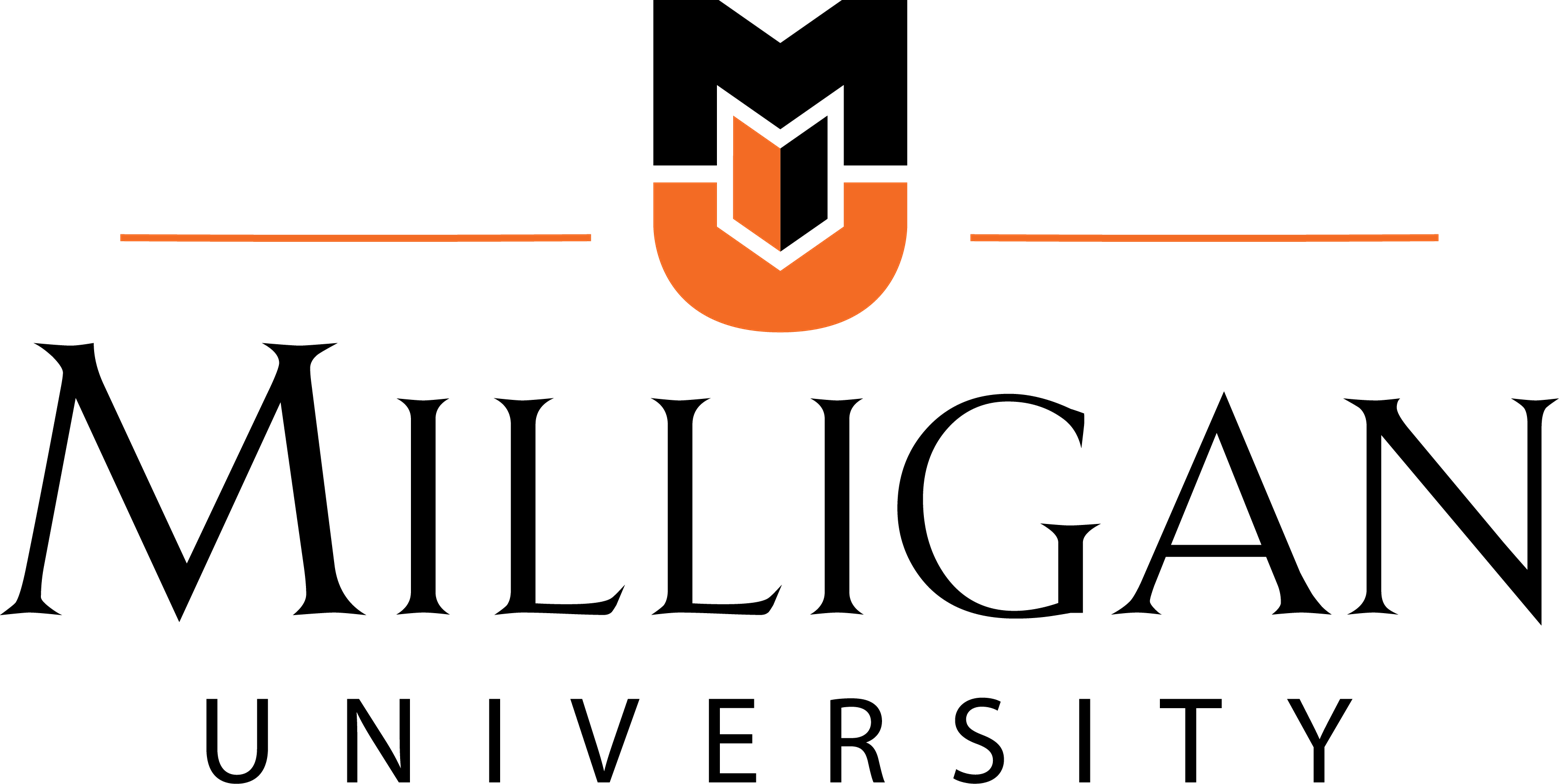

Milligan University is a private Christian university in Milligan College, Tennessee, United States. Founded in 1866 as the Buffalo Male and Female Institute, and known as Milligan College from 1881 to May 2020, the school has a student population of more than 1,300 students, most of whom live and study on its 355-acre (1.44 km^{2}) campus. Milligan University is historically related to the Restoration Movement. The university offers over 100 programs of study leading to both undergraduate and graduate degrees.

== History ==
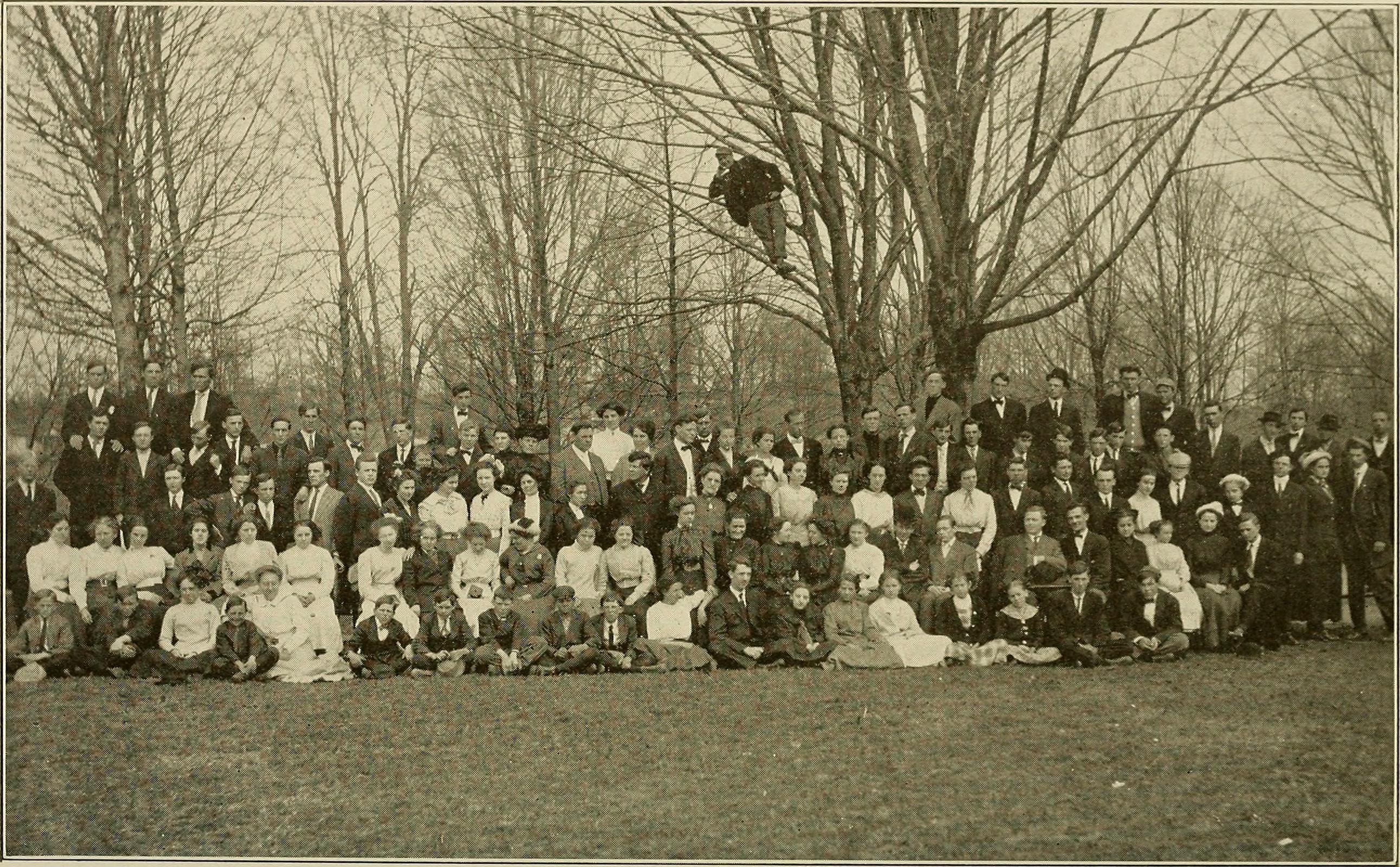
A campus scene, 1913

In 1943, Milligan became the only college in the nation to completely turn its facilities over to naval training programs. The V-12 Navy College Training Program used the college's campus from 1943 to 1945.

On March 18, 2011, the Board of Trustees appointed Bill Greer (Milligan Class of 1985) as the 15th president; Greer assumed leadership of the college on July 15, 2011.

In the spring of 2020, the university drew attention for its views of and actions related to gay and lesbian people after the university fired a professor for being in a same-sex relationship. This administrative decision was founded on a document drafted in 2015 detailing the administration's views on homosexuality.

== Campus ==
Academic rankings

Master's
- Washington Monthly: 214 of 604

Regional
- U.S. News & World Report: 15 of 90

The Elizabeth Leitner Gregory Center for the Liberal Arts, a center for performing arts, opened on January 16, 2008. It features a 300-seat theater, photography labs, and classrooms for the fine arts programs at the university.

== Student life ==
As a church-related liberal arts university, Milligan remains closely aligned with the Christian Churches/Churches of Christ, a capella churches of Christ, and the Christian Church (Disciples of Christ), the three religious bodies that have traditionally supported the school. A campus ministry program and culture of service exist on campus. Alcohol and tobacco use are prohibited on campus. On August 1, 2019, the university changed its alcohol policy to allow students over the age of 21 to drink alcohol off campus.

The Milligan Stampede is Milligan University's student-run newspaper. It was founded in 1925. Its staff also operate a student-run broadcast news service and news website.

== Athletics ==
The Milligan athletic teams are called the Buffaloes. The university is a member of the National Association of Intercollegiate Athletics (NAIA), primarily competing in the Appalachian Athletic Conference (AAC) since the 2001–02 academic year.

Milligan competes in 29 intercollegiate varsity sports: Men's sports include baseball, basketball, bowling, cross country, cycling, eSports, golf, soccer, swimming, tennis, track & field, triathlon and volleyball; while women's sports include basketball, bowling, cheerleading, cross country, cycling, dance, eSports, flag football, golf, soccer, softball, swimming, tennis, track & field, triathlon, and volleyball. Former sports included football and men's disc golf.

== Notable people ==
- Buddy Bolding, baseball coach, Class of 1973
- Warren Eugene Brandon (1916–1977), painter and photographer
- David Davis, Class of 1991, U.S. Congressman from Tennessee District 1
- William G. Dever, Syro-Palestinian archaeologist
- E. C. Duggins, head football coach at Appalachian State University, class of 1935
- Del Harris, basketball coach, Class of 1959
- Megan Jastrab, earned bronze medal in Women's Team Pursuit during the 2020 Tokyo Olympics
- Frank Knight, Class of 1911, American economist
- John Preston McConnell, ordained minister in the Christian Church, and was the founder and first president of Radford University; he also served as the pastor of First Christian Church (Disciples of Christ) in Radford, Virginia, which is located just across the street from Radford University
- Francis Gary Powers, American pilot whose U-2 spy plane was shot down while over the Soviet Union, causing the U-2 Crisis of 1960, Class of 1950
- Sonny Smith, basketball coach and commentator, Class of 1958
- Loren Stuckenbruck, Class of 1981, professor and scholar of Second Temple Judaism
- Alfred A. Taylor, Tennessee governor and congressional representative
- Robert Love Taylor, Tennessee governor and congressional representative
