= King Tornado football =

1895–1941 King University athletic team

- First season: 1895; 131 years ago
- Last season: 1941; 85 years ago

Conference championships
- 1
- Colors: Scarlet and navy

The King Tornado football program was the intercollegiate American football team for King College (now known as King University) located in Bristol, Tennessee. The team was first known to have played in the 1895 season and continued until the 1941 season. They did not have a name until they adopted the moniker "Tornado" following the 1922 season. The team was best known for having the second-largest win in college football history, a 206–0 defeat of Lenoir–Rhyne.

== History ==
The King football team was first known to have played in the 1895 college football season, when they compiled a record of 1–0. They played small schedules each year through 1902 before going on hiatus, including against major teams such as Virginia Tech and Tennessee. The team returned in 1908 and played through 1916 before going on hiatus again due to World War I, then being revived in 1921.

The Tornado had rivalries with local schools including Emory & Henry, Concord, East Tennessee State, Appalachian State and Carson–Newman. In addition to playing Virginia Tech and Tennessee (whom they went a combined 0–13 against), other prominent schools King played against included the Florida Gators, whom they lost to in 1914, and the Louisville Cardinals, whom they defeated in 1924.

The peak of the football team came in the early 1920s. They went 24–7–1 from 1921 to 1924 with winning seasons each year and became best known for their defeat of Lenoir–Rhyne in 1922. The team opened the game with a 34-yard touchdown run and dominated throughout, scoring 55 points in the first quarter, 108 by halftime, and 206 total for only the third 200-point college football game, and the second-highest scoring behind the 1916 Cumberland vs. Georgia Tech football game. The Bristol Herald Courier reported afterwards that:

Lenoir College of Hickory, N.C., said to have one of the strongest football teams in the Tar Heel state, yesterday suffered inglorious defeat when it met the 'wonder team' of King College at Tenneva Field. With the second team playing most of the game, Kaysee ran up 206 points. The visitors failed to score a single time and did not threaten the goal line of the local college. Local football enthusiasts consider the victory most significant of Kaysee's strength. Smashing line plunges, perfectly executed runs around the end and in every department King completely outclassed the Carolina team. Sharp, Orr, Osborne and Captain Finnifrock tore off long gains at will, riddled smashed and crumbled the visitor's line. When the first team was taken off the field the firm of Hodge, Maupin and Reuning continued the gains by brilliant playing. Because of approaching darkness the game was called before it had reached full time. The first two quarters were of 15 minutes each, the third quarter 12 minutes and the last of six minutes. The Carolina players appeared to be glad it was over.

King defeated Lenoir–Rhyne so heavily that the sportswriter for the game "became so bored with the beatdown" that he stopped noting statistics following the first half. By the second quarter the starters had all stopped playing, but The Charlotte Observer noted that "Second string men also had little trouble scoring." Every King player was able to score in the game. The team's quarterback later noted in 1955 that "If we had been able to play a regulation game we'd have broken the old scoring record of 222 that Georgia Tech rolled up against Cumberland University. Lenoir-Rhyne was late in getting to Bristol ... We never finished the fourth quarter. It got so dark we couldn't see the ball and the game was called." They received national attention for their win and it was from this that their nickname, the "Tornado", was born: a newspaper headline was titled "King College's Victory Was 'Tornado' Of Week's Games" and the name stuck.

Overall in 1922, the Tornado compiled a record of 6–2, and the following year, they went 8–0–1 for the best season in school history; they totaled 507 points in the 1923 season while only allowing two touchdowns, and in the two years combined, they scored 1,005 points in 17 games. They had moderate success after their 1921–1924 prominence, having four winning seasons and seven losing seasons from 1925 to 1935. They hired Pedie Jackson in 1936, who became a beloved coach but died following his second season. Jack Young became coach in 1938 following Jackson's death; they had three winning seasons in four years under him, but suspended operations due to World War II and never returned.

== Conference affiliation ==
- 1895–1902, 1908–1916, 1921–1926: Independent
- 1927–1941: Smoky Mountain Conference
