= Smoky Mountain Conference =

Intercollegiate athletic conference

The Smoky Mountain Conference – officially the Smoky Mountain Athletic Conference – was an intercollegiate athletic conference that existed from December 1926 to October 1966. Most teams in the league were located in Tennessee, and there were at times teams from Virginia and North Carolina. The first commissioner of the league was W. O. "Chink" Lowe, who had played college football for the Tennessee Volunteers; he served as commissioner until September 1941.

== Members ==
The following is an incomplete list of the membership of the Smoky Mountain Conference.

Charter members of the conference when it was formed were; Carson–Newman, Emory & Henry, King, Maryville, Milligan, and Tusculum.

Institution	Location	Founded	Nickname	First season	Last season	Current conference	Current division	Ref
Appalachian State Teachers College	Boone, North Carolina	1899	Mountaineers	1935	1937	Sun Belt	DI FBS	
Carson–Newman College	Jefferson City, Tennessee	1851	Eagles	1927	1951	South Atlantic	DII	
Cumberland University	Lebanon, Tennessee	1842	Bulldogs*	1932	1941	Mid-South	NAIA	
East Tennessee State Teacher's College	Johnson City, Tennessee	1911	Buccaneers	1930	1951	Southern	DI FCS	
Emory & Henry College	Emory, Virginia	1836	Wasps	1927		South Atlantic	DII	
King College	Bristol, Tennessee	1867	Tornados	1927	1939	Carolinas	DII	†
Lincoln Memorial University	Harrogate, Tennessee	1897	Railsplitters	1930	1931	South Atlantic	DII	†
Maryville College	Maryville, Tennessee	1819	Scots	1927		USA South	DIII	
Milligan College	Milligan College, Tennessee	1866	Buffaloes	1927		Appalachian	NAIA	†
Tennessee Wesleyan College	Athens, Tennessee	1857	Bulldogs	1956		Appalachian	NAIA	†
Tusculum College	Tusculum, Tennessee	1794	Pioneers	1927		South Atlantic	DII	
Western Carolina Teachers College	Cullowhee, North Carolina	1889	Catamounts	1934		Southern	DI FCS	

† School does not currently have an active football program.
* Cumberland's team is now nicknamed the Phoenix.

== Football champions ==
The conference did not operate from late 1941 until mid-1946, due to World War II. After the 1950 season, rarely were there more than two teams competing in football. Typically, those two teams were Carson-Newman and Emory & Henry. Usually, the winner of that game was "declared" the conference title holder.

- 1927: No champion
- 1928: Emory and Henry
- 1929: Milligan
- 1930: Carson–Newman
- 1931: Maryville
- 1932: King
- 1933: Carson–Newman
- 1934: Milligan
- 1935: Cumberland (TN)
- 1936: Carson–Newman
- 1937: Carson–Newman†
- 1938: East Tennessee State
- 1939: Carson–Newman†
- 1940: Milligan
- 1941: King
- 1942: N/A
- 1943: N/A
- 1944: N/A
- 1945: N/A
- 1946: Milligan
- 1947: Carson–Newman
- 1948: No champion
- 1949: Emory and Henry
- 1950: Emory and Henry
- 1951: Emory and Henry
- 1952: Emory and Henry
- 1953: Emory and Henry
- 1954: Carson–Newman and Emory and Henry
- 1955: Emory and Henry
- 1956: Emory and Henry
- 1957:
- 1958: Emory and Henry
- 1959:
- 1960:
- 1961:
- 1962: Emory and Henry
- 1963:
- 1964:
- 1965:

† School media guide inconsistent with contemporary newspaper reports.

== Basketball champions ==
=== Regular season ===
- 1929: Milligan
- 1930: Milligan
- 1931: Milligan
- 1932: Milligan
- 1933: Milligan
- 1934: Milligan
- 1935: Maryville
- 1936: Maryville
- 1937: Carson–Newman
- 1938: Milligan
- 1939: Milligan
- 1940: Lincoln Memorial
- 1941: Lincoln Memorial
- 1942: Carson–Newman
- 1951 – Lincoln Memorial
- 1956 – Lincoln Memorial

=== Tournament ===
- 1929: Emory & Henry
- 1930: Milligan
- 1931: Milligan
- 1946: East Tennessee State; tourney played on February 21-23, 1946, as officials worked to reform conference after WWII, which was finalized on March 30, 1946, in Greeneville, TN.
- 1947: Lincoln Memorial
- 1948: Milligan
- 1949: Lincoln Memorial
- 1950: Union (KY)
- 1951: East Tennessee State
- 1952: East Tennessee State
- 1953: Tusculum
- 1954: Emory & Henry
- 1955: Lincoln Memorial
- 1956: Tusculum
- 1957: Lincoln Memorial
- 1958: Lincoln Memorial
- 1959: No postseason tournament
- 1960: Lincoln Memorial
- 1961: Milligan
- 1962: No postseason tournament

== See also ==
- List of defunct college football conferences
