= Milligan Buffaloes =

- University: Milligan University
- Nickname: Buffaloes
- Association: NAIA
- Conference: AAC (primary)
- Athletic director: David Blackburn
- Location: Milligan, Tennessee
- Varsity teams: 29 (12 men's, 15 women's)
- Basketball arena: Steve Lacy Fieldhouse
- Baseball stadium: Anglin Baseball Field
- Softball stadium: Anglin Softball Field
- Soccer stadium: Anglin Soccer Field
- Tennis venue: Mathes Tennis Center
- Colors: Black and Orange
- Mascot: Brutus
- Website: milliganbuffs.com
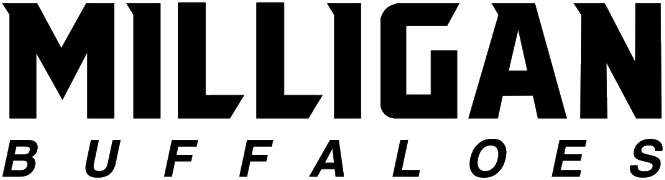

The Milligan Buffaloes are the athletic teams that represent Milligan University, located in Milligan College, Tennessee, in intercollegiate sports as a member of the National Association of Intercollegiate Athletics (NAIA), primarily competing in the Appalachian Athletic Conference (AAC) since the 2001–02 academic year.

== History ==
=== 2022 car crash ===
In 2022 a car hit a group of 3 students who were practicing in York County, Virginia. One student, Eli Cramer, was killed in the crash. The Virginia State Police later arrested the man responsible for the crash who was driving under the influence. The other students survived. Cramer was honoured at what would have been his graduation in 2024

== Varsity teams ==
Milligan competes in 29 intercollegiate varsity sports. The football program was discontinued in 1950 due to financial reasons.

Men's sports	Women's sports
Baseball	Basketball
Basketball	Bowling
Bowling	Cross country
Cross country	Cycling and triathlon
Cycling	Disc golf
Disc golf	Flag football
Golf	Golf
Soccer	Soccer
Swimming	Softball
Tennis	Swimming
Track and field	Tennis

== National championships ==
=== Team ===
Sport	Titles	Assoc.	Division	Year	Rival	Score
Cross country (men's)	2	NAIA	Single	2021	Saint Mary	115–175
Cross country (men's)	2	NAIA	Single	2023	Saint Mary	93–98
Cross country (women's)	1	NAIA	Single	2021	Saint Francis (IL)	122–141

== Notable athletes ==
- Megan Jastrab, professional racing cyclist and 2020 Olympics medalist
- Ryan Kent, 3x All American NAIA Champion of Character
- Will Little, Major League Baseball umpire
- Doc Ozmer, professional baseball player with the Philadelphia Athletics
- Sonny Smith, College Basketball Coach
