= Montana Grizzlies and Lady Griz =

Intercollegiate sports teams of University of Montana

- University: University of Montana
- Nickname: Grizzlies, Griz, Lady Griz
- NCAA: Division I (FCS)
- Conference: Big Sky Conference
- Athletic director: Kent Haslam
- Location: Missoula, Montana
- Varsity teams: 15
- Football stadium: Washington–Grizzly Stadium
- Basketball arena: Dahlberg Arena
- Softball stadium: Grizzly Field
- Soccer stadium: South Campus Stadium
- Colors: Maroon and silver
- Mascot: Monte the Bear
- Fight song: Up With Montana
- Website: gogriz.com
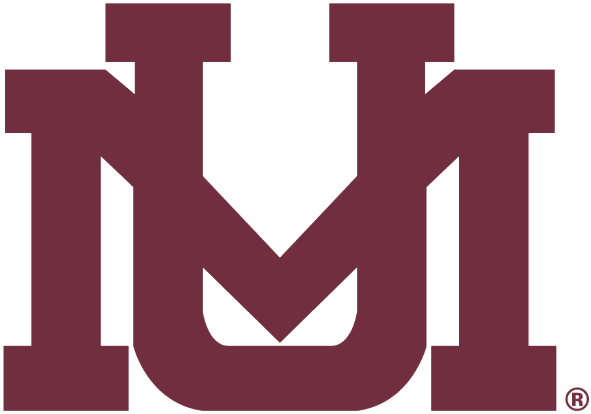

The Montana Grizzlies and Lady Griz are the nicknames given to the athletic teams of the University of Montana, located in Missoula. The university is a member of the Big Sky Conference and competes in NCAA Division I, fielding six men's teams (basketball, football, cross country, tennis, and track and field (indoor and outdoor)) and nine women's teams (basketball, cross country, golf, soccer, softball, tennis, track and field (indoor and outdoor), and volleyball). The football team has won the university's only two NCAA championships.

== Sports sponsored ==
Men's sports	Women's sports
Basketball	Basketball
Cross country	Cross country
Football	Golf
Tennis	Soccer
Track and field^{1}	Softball
	Tennis
	Track and field^{1}
	Volleyball
^{1} – Track and field includes both indoor and outdoor

== Programs ==
=== Football ===
The University of Montana Grizzlies Football team originated in 1897, 129 years ago.

The football team has won national championships in 1995 and 2001

The Grizzlies have played in their current home, Washington–Grizzly Stadium, since 1986, with an official capacity of 25,217.

The Grizzlies hold the FCS (was I-AA) records for total number of post season appearances (28) which include 1982, 1988, 1989, 1993–2009, 2011, 2013–2015, 2019, 2021–2023, and number of consecutive post season appearances (17) 1993-2009 which was dubbed "The Streak"

Montana won the national championship in 1995 under Don Read when Dave Dickenson led the team to a victory over Marshall University in the national championship game. In 2001, coach Joe Glenn led the Montana Grizzlies to another national championship, defeating Furman University by a score of 13–6.

Montana has annual rivalry games against in-state rival the Montana State Bobcats which is the Brawl of the Wild or The Griz-Cat Game, it is the last conference game every year for both squads. The Griz lead the series 74-42-5 (.632).

The second rivalry game is against the University of Idaho Vandals for the Little Brown Stein. Montana trails that series at 31-56-2 (.360), it wasn't played from 2004-2017, After the Idaho football team rejoined the Big Sky Conference in 2018, the game is once again scheduled every season. Montana has won 8 of their last 9 meetings (2000–Present)

The third rivalry game the Grizzlies have is with the Eastern Washington Eagles in the EWU–UM Governors Cup, Montana leads the series 30-18-1 (.622), Beginning in 2018 the game is no longer guaranteed to be scheduled every season. Griz have gone back and forth with Eagles in the last two decades but still have a slight 13-10 (2000-Present) record over the Eagles.

=== Men's basketball ===
The men's basketball team plays its home game at Dahlberg Arena. They have been to the NCAA Division I men's basketball tournament twelve times and the National Invitation Tournament four times.

=== Women's basketball ===
The Lady Griz, as the women's basketball team is known, is one of the most successful women's basketball programs in the country. As of the end of the 2008–2009 season they have compiled a 757-252 (.750) record and a 388-85 (.820) conference record. Their head coach was Shannon Schweyen, who was elevated from top assistant during the 2016 offseason following the retirement of Robin Selvig, who had compiled an 865–286 (.752) record in 38 seasons with the Lady Griz. They play their games at Dahlberg Arena.

The Lady Griz have made the NCAA Division I Women's Basketball Championship tournament 22 times, compiling a 6–18 record. They've also have 3 WNIT appearances. Through all of their success, the Lady Griz have never advanced past the second round, having reach it 7 times (1984, 1986, 1988, 1989, 1992, 1994, 1995). They have also won 22 regular season conference championships (Northwest Women's Basketball League (2), Mountain West Conference (5), Big Sky Conference (15).

== Team image ==
=== Nickname and mascot ===
Originally known as the Bears with a live black bear named Teddy as the mascot, the university's basketball team officially became the Grizzlies (sometimes called the Silvertips) in 1923 when they were admitted to the Pacific Coast Conference (PCC). That same year Montana became the first state in the nation to designate grizzlies as a protected game animal. This name change would later prove problematic, however, for their new PCC conference-mate UCLA who had also recently changed their name to the Grizzlies. When UCLA petitioned to join the conference in 1926, Montana claimed rights to the name and the UCLA Grizzlies became the UCLA Bruins when they were admitted to the conference in 1928.

The Grizzlies continued to use live bears as mascots until the early 1960s. In addition to Teddy, there was a Cocoa, a Chester, and three different Fessy's (named after former football coach Doug Fessenden), among several others. In the 1970s and 1980s costumed mascots were introduced, but as mascots of local sponsors, not the university. This included the Hamm's Beer bear, a chicken from a local radio station, and even Ronald McDonald. Later in the 1980s, a costumed mascot by the name of Grizzly Otto (after local sponsor Grizzly Auto) was introduced as part of the Montana cheer squad. The current mascot, Monte (short for Montana), was introduced in 1993 and in 2002 became the first winner of the Capital One Bowl's "Mascot of the Year" contest. He won again in 2004 and was nominated three other times.

=== Colors ===
1893–1967	Maroon & Silver	
1968–1996	Copper & Gold	
1997–present	Maroon & Silver	

Big Sky Conference logo in Montana's colors

The university's official colors are copper, silver, and gold, and were chosen in recognition of the state's mining history. Contrary to popular perception, these colors have never changed with the confusion stemming from the university's decision to represent "copper" with either maroon or Texas orange at various times in its history.

When the university was founded in 1893 and its colors chosen, a lack of copper dye led the school to use maroon and occasionally other colors to represent the copper. This had the effect of having the athletic teams not always being represented across the board by the same uniform colors. In 1967, then head football coach and athletic director Jack Swarthout, who personally preferred the maroon and silver used by the football team, sought to make the schools colors more consistent and held a vote among UM coaches. They selected Texas orange (to represent copper) and gold to be used on the school's uniforms and it remained for the next thirty years.

The maroon was brought back as part of the university's centennial celebrations in 1993 and a student survey in 1995 showed support for a return to maroon and silver uniforms. Despite some vocal opposition, by 1997 the colors began to phase into the maroon and silver that continues to be used.

== Facilities ==
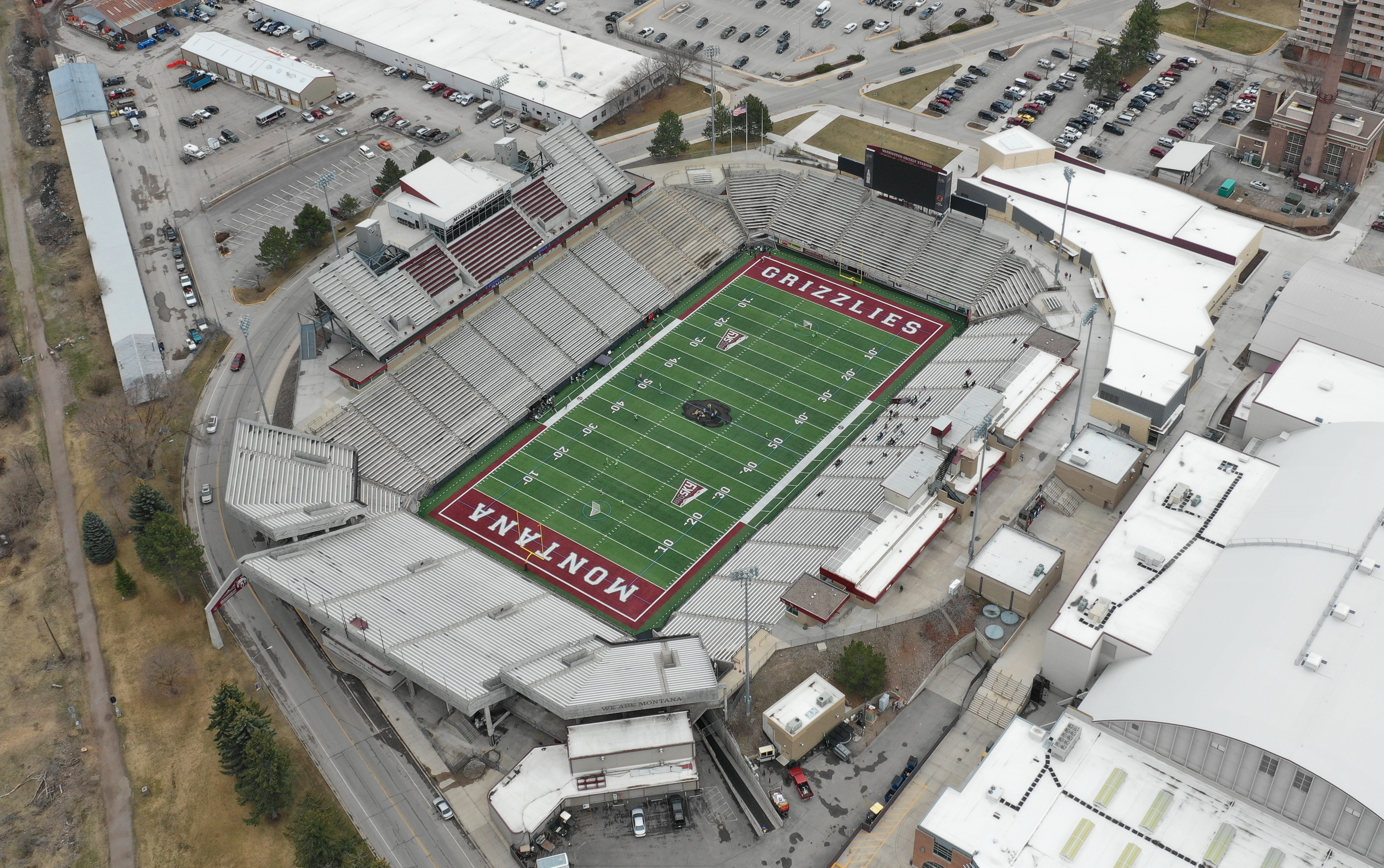
Washington–Grizzly Stadium

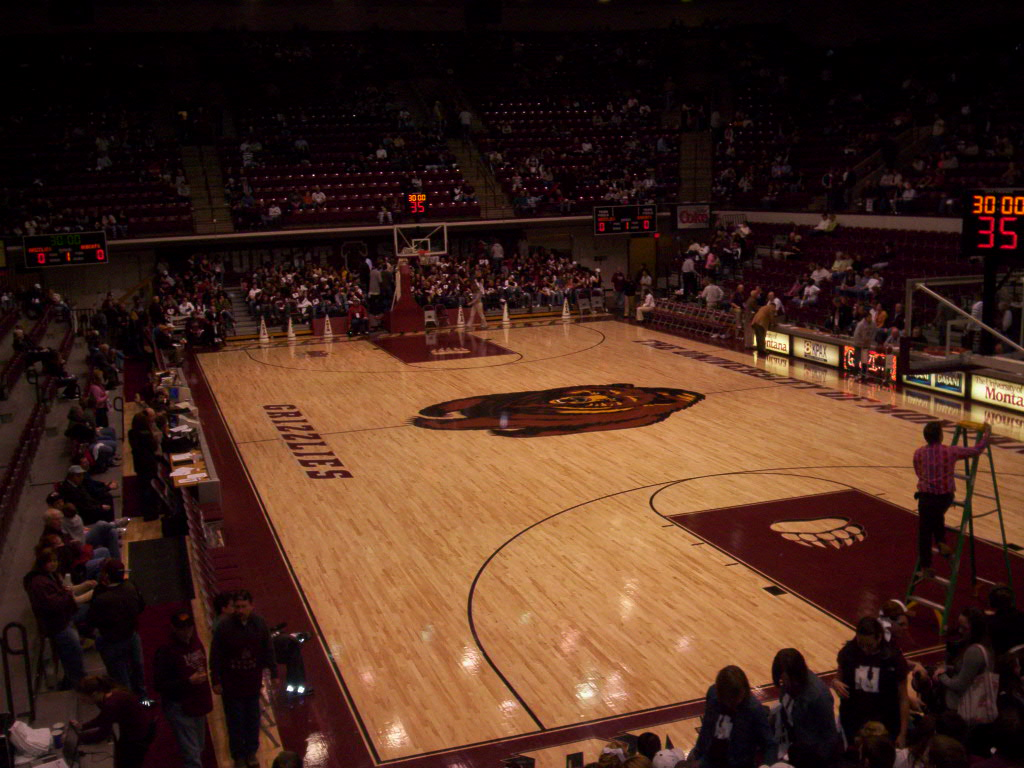
Dahlberg Arena

Venue	Sport(s)	Open.	Ref.
Adams Center Auxiliary Gymnasiums	Volleyball	1998	
Dahlberg Arena	Basketball	1953	
Dornblaser Field (Note: The Dornblaser fields successively fielded the Montana football team until a new facility (Washington–Grizzly Stadium) was completed on campus in 1986.)	Track and field	1967	
Robert O. Lindsay Center	Tennis	n/a	
Grizzly Field	Softball	2015	
South Campus Stadium	Soccer	n/a	
Washington–Grizzly Stadium (Note: In August 1985 Missoula businessman Dennis R. Washington and the employees of Washington Corporations provided a gift of $1 million and the stadium has since been the named Washington–Grizzly Stadium. The cost of the stadium was around $3.2 million. There are 49 private boxes located on the east and west sides of the stadium, and they are individually decorated and furnished. Stadiums improvements include: (1986): original layout had 12,500 permanent seats, and seating was available, weather-permitting, in the grass end zones, which made the capacity around 15,000. (1995): the stadium underwent its first expansion in the north and south end zones. The cost of that expansion was about $2.5 million and brought seating to 19,000. (2001): Sprinturf was added prior to the 2001 season at a cost of about $1 million, which was paid for by an anonymous donor, but with the request that the field be named "John Hoyt Field" in honor of John Hoyt, a long-time Grizzly booster, who died in March of that year. A new Sprinturf playing surface was installed prior to the 2008 season. (2002): GrizVision, a state-of-the-art video and message center, was added in 2002. GrizVision displays game statistics, player profiles, digital replays, and shots of the crowd. The screen is one of the largest in the FCS, measuring 26 feet by 36 feet, and it came from New York City and Times Square. (2003): the second expansion occurred in the spring and summer of 2003, and approximately 4,000 seats were added to the north end zone section, increasing the stadium capacity to 23,183, with a cost around $3.5 million. (2007): the third expansion, at a cost of approximately $6.5 million, occurred prior to the 2008 football season. The eastside expansion now houses a 500-seat "Stadium Club" with two membership levels: the "Canyon Room" has 125 seats inside and 125 seats outside, and the "Hellgate Terrace," which has 250 seats. This expansion increased the current seating capacity of Washington- Grizzly Stadium to 25,217.)	Football	1986	

== University Marching Band ==
The band has its origins in the late 19th century and has since continued its tradition into the new millennium. Marching in contemporary corps-style, the program endeavors to stay on the cutting edge of trends in outdoor music performances. The program is also one of the most visible organizations on the University of Montana campus, performing at all Grizzly football home games in the 25,500-seat Washington–Grizzly Stadium. The group also travels to several conference games throughout the Northwest and has accompanied the football team to four Division I-AA National Championships in recent years.

=== Fight song ===
"Up With Montana"

. . . and the squeal of the pig will float on the air; from the tummy of the Grizzly bear.

— closing line of "Up With Montana"

The lyrics to "Up with Montana" are credited to Dick Howell, a Law student and member of the glee club in the 1910s, "to commemorate the rivalry" for game number twenty-one between UM and Montana State University, in 1914. The origin of the tune itself, however, is disputed. The Stanford Jonah is a fight song of the University of California, Berkeley written in 1913 by Ted Haley as an entry into a song contest held by the Daily Californian. The song continues to be a hit at most sporting events, but specifically at events between the California Golden Bears and their rival, the Stanford Cardinal. Georgia Tech's "White And Gold" and The Naval Academy's "Up With The Navy" (which gives credit to the University of Montana), also share a similar tune.

== Former sports ==
Montana formerly competed in wrestling, skiing, and women's gymnastics; all three programs were dropped in 1987 due to budget restrictions by the university regents. The baseball program was discontinued following the 1972 season; its Campbell ballpark was adjacent to the north end of Dornblaser Field (II), aligned southeast (home plate to center field).

== See also ==
- List of college athletic programs in Montana
