= Citrus Bowl =

Annual American college football postseason game

- Stadium: Camping World Stadium
- Location: Orlando, Florida
- Temporary venue: Florida Field, Gainesville, Florida (1973)
- Operated: 1947–present
- Conference tie-ins: Big Ten, SEC
- Previous conference tie-ins: MAC (1968–1975); SoCon (1968–1972); ACC (1987–1991)
- Payout: US$8,224,578 (2019 season)
- Website: citrusbowlorlando.com

Sponsors
- Florida Citrus Growers Association (1983–2002); CompUSA (1994–1999); Ourhouse.com (2000); Capital One (2001–2014); Buffalo Wild Wings (2015–2017); Overton's (2018); Vrbo (2019–2022); Kellogg's / Kellanova (2023–2025); through the Cheez-It brand

Former names
- Tangerine Bowl (1947–1982) (Note: For three games that re-used Tangerine Bowl naming two decades later, see Tangerine Bowl (2001–2003).); Florida Citrus Bowl (1983–1993); CompUSA Florida Citrus Bowl (1994–1999); Ourhouse.com Florida Citrus Bowl (2000); Capital One Florida Citrus Bowl (2001–2002); Capital One Bowl (2003–2014); Buffalo Wild Wings Citrus Bowl (2015–2017); Citrus Bowl presented by Overton's (2018); Vrbo Citrus Bowl (2019–2022); Cheez-It Citrus Bowl (2023–2025)

2025 matchup
- Texas vs. Michigan (Texas 41–27)

The Citrus Bowl is an annual college football bowl game played at Camping World Stadium in Orlando, Florida. The bowl is operated by Florida Citrus Sports, a non-profit group that also organizes the Pop-Tarts Bowl and Florida Classic.

Since the mid-1980s, the Citrus Bowl has drawn many high-ranked teams and is typically played at 1 p.m. EST on New Year's Day and broadcast nationally on ABC. When January 1 is a Sunday, the game has been played on January 2 or December 31, to avoid conflicting with the National Football League (NFL) schedule. As of 2019, it had the largest payout of all bowls other than those that were part of the College Football Playoff (CFP), at $8.55 million per team. In nearly every year since 1985, the game has featured two teams ranked in the AP poll.

== History ==
=== Naming and sponsorship ===
The game was first played as the Tangerine Bowl in 1947 before being renamed as the Florida Citrus Bowl in 1983. Capital One was the game's title sponsor between 2001 and 2014; the game was named the Capital One Bowl from 2003 to 2014. Since the 2015 edition, the game has been staged as the Citrus Bowl.

Sponsorship of the bowl has include CompUSA (1994–1999), Ourhouse.com (2000), Buffalo Wild Wings (2015–2017), Overton's (2018), Vrbo (2019–2022) and Cheez-It (2023 2025).

=== Tangerine Bowl (1947–1982) ===
The game, which began play in 1947, is one of the oldest bowls outside of the New Year's Six, along with the Gator Bowl and Sun Bowl. By 1952, the game was dubbed the "Little Bowl with the Big Heart", because all the proceeds from the game went to charity.

From 1964 through 1967, it was one of the four regional finals in the College Division (which became Division II and Division III in 1973), along with the Pecan, Grantland Rice, and Camellia bowls. In this capacity, the Tangerine Bowl sought to match the two best non-major teams in a 17-state Eastern Region stretching from New England to Florida.

In 1968, the Boardwalk Bowl in Atlantic City took over as the College Division Eastern regional final, and the Tangerine Bowl became a major college bowl game, featuring teams from the University Division (which became Division I in 1973).

The Tangerine Bowl name was used through the December 1982 game. The same name was re-used later, but for a bowl game with a different lineage.

=== Florida Citrus Bowl (1983–2002) ===
In March 1983, the name of the game was changed from Tangerine Bowl to Florida Citrus Bowl, via a $1.25 million agreement with the Florida Citrus Commission; the bowl's organizing committee also changed its name from Tangerine Sports Association to Florida Citrus Sports Association. A month earlier, organizers had rejected a proposal to rename the game to Grapefruit Bowl.

In 1986, it was one of the bowl games considered for the site of the "winner take all" national championship game between Penn State and Miami, before the Fiesta Bowl was eventually chosen.

The January 1991 game had national championship implications for the 1990 season; Georgia Tech won the Florida Citrus Bowl, finished 11–0–1, and was voted the 1990 UPI national champion. That occurrence marks a rare example of a non-New Year's Six bowl game featuring a team later named national champion. (Note: See also the 1984 Holiday Bowl.)

The January 1, 1998, game, which featured nearby Florida beating Penn State, holds the game's attendance record at 72,940. The Gators returned to the bowl two years later, losing on a field goal on the final play to Michigan State.

=== Capital One Bowl (2003–2014) ===
Starting with the January 2003 edition, the bowl was renamed as the Capital One Bowl, with title sponsorship by Capital One.

In 2004, the bowl bid to become the fifth BCS game, but was not chosen, primarily due to the stadium's aging condition. In July 2007, the Orange County Commissioners voted in favor of spending $1.1 billion to build the Amway Center for the Orlando Magic, the Dr. Phillips Center for the Performing Arts, and to upgrade the Citrus Bowl stadium.

Following the January 2014 game, Capital One ceased its sponsorship of the bowl, and moved its sponsorship to the Orange Bowl.

=== Citrus Bowl (2015–present) ===
Buffalo Wild Wings was announced as the new sponsor of the bowl game, which was renamed as the Citrus Bowl for the January 2015 edition. Buffalo Wild Wings had previously been the title sponsor of what had been the Insight Bowl. In the offseason of 2017, Buffalo Wild Wings ceased sponsoring the bowl. Following sponsorship by Overton's (2018) and Vrbo (2019–2022), Kellogg's became the title sponsor in November 2022, via its Cheez-It brand. In 2026, it was announced that Kellogg's had quietly dropped its sponsorship of the game, leaving the game without a title sponsor pending a new deal being reached.

The 2016 season game was played on December 31, the first time in 30 years that the game was not played on January 1 or 2.

=== Conference tie-ins ===
From 1968 through 1975, the bowl featured the Mid-American Conference (MAC) champion against an opponent from the Southern Conference (1968–1971), the Southeastern Conference (SEC) (1973–1974), or an at-large opponent (1972, 1975). MAC teams were 6–2 during those games.

As the major football conferences relaxed restrictions on post-season play in the mid-1970s, the bowl went to a matchup between two at-large teams from major conferences, with one school typically (but not always) from the South.

From the 1987 season through the 1991 season, the bowl featured the Atlantic Coast Conference (ACC) champion against an at-large opponent. ACC teams were 3–2 during those games, including Georgia Tech's win vs. Nebraska following the 1990 season to clinch a share of the national championship.

From the 1992 season through the 2015 season, the bowl featured an SEC vs. Big Ten matchup – the SEC won 14 of those games, while the Big Ten won 10.

During the 1990s, the second-place finisher in the SEC typically went to this bowl. Florida coach Steve Spurrier, speaking to the fact that Tennessee occupied that spot three of four years as Florida finished first, famously quipped "You can't spell 'Citrus' without U-T!"

Currently, the bowl has tie-ins with the SEC and the Big Ten, holding the first selection after the CFP selection process for both conferences. Since the formation of the CFP, the Citrus Bowl has a chance to occasionally host an ACC team, replacing the Big Ten representative. This will happen the years in which the Orange Bowl is not a CFP semi-final game and selects a Big Ten team to match against their ACC team. This happened following the 2016 season, as the Orange Bowl was not a CFP semi-final and invited Michigan of the Big Ten to face Florida State of the ACC; the Citrus Bowl then invited Louisville of the ACC to face LSU of the SEC. The next year, Wisconsin was invited to the Orange Bowl, so the SEC's LSU was pitted against Notre Dame, who received an invite in lieu of an ACC team.

=== Racial integration ===
The undefeated 1955 Hillsdale College football team refused an invitation to the January 1956 edition of the bowl when bowl officials insisted that Hillsdale's four African-American players would not be allowed to play in the game.

The University at Buffalo's first bowl bid was to the December 1958 edition. The Tangerine Bowl Commission hoped that the Orlando High School Athletic Association (OHSAA), which operated the stadium, would waive its rule that prohibited integrated sporting events. When it refused, the team unanimously voted to skip the bowl because its two black players (halfback Willie Evans and end Mike Wilson) would not have been allowed on the field. Buffalo did not become bowl-eligible for another 50 years. During the 2008 season, when the Bulls were on the verge of bowl eligibility, the 1958 team was profiled on ESPN's Outside the Lines. The 2008 team went on to win the Mid-American Conference title, and played in the International Bowl.

Eight years later, OHSAA's rule had been changed, and Morgan State of Baltimore, under head coach Earl Banks, became the first historically black college to play in (and win) a Tangerine Bowl.

=== Gainesville ===
In early 1973, construction improvements were planned for the then 17,000-seat Tangerine Bowl stadium to expand to over 51,000 seats. In early summer 1973, however, construction was stalled due to legal concerns, and the improvements were delayed. Late in the 1973 season, Tangerine Bowl President Will Gieger and other officials planned to invite the Miami Redskins and the East Carolina Pirates to Orlando for the game. On November 19, 1973, East Carolina withdrew from bowl consideration when no invitation arrived before Thanksgiving break, and the bowl was left with one at-large bid. In an unexpected and unprecedented move, game officials decided to invite the Florida Gators, and move the game to Florida Field in Gainesville, the Gators' home stadium. The larger stadium was needed to accommodate the large crowd expected. The move required special permission from the NCAA, and special accommodations were made. Both teams were headquartered in Orlando for the week, and spent most of their time there, including practices, and were bused up to Gainesville.

The participants were greeted with an unexpected event, a near-record low temperature of 25 °F (−4 °C). Despite the home-field advantage, in the game nicknamed the "Transplant Bowl", Miami, who found the cold much more to its liking, defeated the Gators, 16–7. One of the players on the victorious Redskins squad was future Gators coach Ron Zook.

The one-time moving of the game, and the fears of a permanent relocation, rejuvenated the stalled stadium renovations in Orlando. The game returned to Orlando for 1974, and within a couple of years, the expansion project was complete.

=== Mascot Challenge ===
The "Capital One Mascot Challenge" (formerly known as the "Capital One National Mascot of the Year") was a contest where fans voted for their favorite college mascot. The contest began in 2002 with the winner being named during the halftime; the winning school was awarded $20,000 towards their mascot program. With the ending of Capital One's sponsorship of the Citrus Bowl, the challenge was moved in 2014 to the Orange Bowl with Capital One's sponsorship of that game. The 2014 season was also the last time that the contest was held.

List of Capital One Mascot Challenge winners
Season	Mascot	University
2002	Monte	University of Montana
2003	Cocky	University of South Carolina
2004	Monte	University of Montana
2005	Herbie Husker	University of Nebraska–Lincoln
2006	Butch T. Cougar	Washington State University
2007	Zippy	University of Akron
2008	Cy the Cardinal	Iowa State University
2009	The Bearcat	University of Cincinnati
2010	Big Blue	Old Dominion University
2011	Wolfie Jr.	University of Nevada, Reno
2012	Raider Red	Texas Tech University
2013	Rocky the Bull	University of South Florida
2014	Aubie	Auburn University

== Game results ==
Rankings are based on the AP poll prior to the game being played. Italics denote a tie game.

No.	Date played	Game name	Winning team		Losing team		Attendance
1	January 1, 1947	Tangerine Bowl	Catawba	31	Maryville	6	9,000
2	January 1, 1948	Tangerine Bowl	Catawba	7	Marshall	0	9,000
3	January 1, 1949	Tangerine Bowl	Murray State 21, Sul Ross State 21				9,000
4	January 2, 1950	Tangerine Bowl	Saint Vincent	7	Emory and Henry	6	9,500
5	January 1, 1951	Tangerine Bowl	Morris Harvey	35	Emory and Henry	14	10,000
6	January 1, 1952	Tangerine Bowl	Stetson	35	Arkansas State	20	12,500
7	January 1, 1953	Tangerine Bowl	East Texas State	33	Tennessee Tech	0	12,340
8	January 1, 1954	Tangerine Bowl	Arkansas State 7, East Texas State 7				12,976
9	January 1, 1955	Tangerine Bowl	Omaha	7	Eastern Kentucky	6	12,759
10	January 2, 1956	Tangerine Bowl	Juniata 6, Missouri Valley 6				10,000
Teams competing from both NCAA College & University divisions
11	January 1, 1957	Tangerine Bowl	West Texas State	20	Mississippi Southern	13	11,000
12	January 1, 1958	Tangerine Bowl	East Texas State	10	Mississippi Southern	9	10,500
13	December 27, 1958	Tangerine Bowl	East Texas State	26	Missouri Valley	7	4,000
14	January 1, 1960	Tangerine Bowl	Middle Tennessee	21	Presbyterian	12	12,500
15	December 30, 1960	Tangerine Bowl	The Citadel	27	Tennessee Tech	0	13,000
16	December 29, 1961	Tangerine Bowl	Lamar Tech	21	Middle Tennessee	14	6,000
17	December 22, 1962	Tangerine Bowl	Houston	49	Miami (OH)	21	7,500
18	December 28, 1963	Tangerine Bowl	Western Kentucky	27	Coast Guard	0	7,500
NCAA College Division (Small College) East Regional Final
19	December 12, 1964	Tangerine Bowl	East Carolina	14	UMass	13	8,000
20	December 11, 1965	Tangerine Bowl	East Carolina	31	Maine	0	8,350
21	December 10, 1966	Tangerine Bowl	Morgan State	14	West Chester	6	7,138
22	December 16, 1967	Tangerine Bowl	Tennessee–Martin	25	West Chester	8	5,500
NCAA University Division (Major College)
23	December 27, 1968	Tangerine Bowl	Richmond	49	#15 Ohio	42	16,114
24	December 26, 1969	Tangerine Bowl	#20 Toledo	56	Davidson	33	16,311
25	December 28, 1970	Tangerine Bowl	#15 Toledo	40	William & Mary	12	15,664
26	December 28, 1971	Tangerine Bowl	#14 Toledo	28	Richmond	3	16,750
27	December 29, 1972	Tangerine Bowl	Tampa	21	Kent State	18	20,062
NCAA Division I
28	December 22, 1973	Tangerine Bowl	#15 Miami (OH)	16	Florida	7	37,234
29	December 21, 1974	Tangerine Bowl	#15 Miami (OH)	21	Georgia	10	20,246
30	December 20, 1975	Tangerine Bowl	#12 Miami (OH)	20	South Carolina	7	20,247
31	December 18, 1976	Tangerine Bowl	#14 Oklahoma State	49	BYU	21	37,812
32	December 23, 1977	Tangerine Bowl	#19 Florida State	40	Texas Tech	17	44,502
NCAA Division I-A
33	December 23, 1978	Tangerine Bowl	NC State	30	Pittsburgh	17	31,356
34	December 22, 1979	Tangerine Bowl	LSU	34	Wake Forest	10	38,666
35	December 20, 1980	Tangerine Bowl	Florida	35	Maryland	20	52,541
36	December 19, 1981	Tangerine Bowl	Missouri	19	#18 Southern Miss	17	50,045
37	December 18, 1982	Tangerine Bowl	#18 Auburn	33	Boston College	26	51,296
38	December 17, 1983	Florida Citrus Bowl	Tennessee	30	#16 Maryland	23	50,500
39	December 22, 1984	Florida Citrus Bowl	Georgia 17, #15 Florida State 17				51,821
40	December 28, 1985	Florida Citrus Bowl	#17 Ohio State	10	#9 BYU	7	50,920
41	January 1, 1987	Florida Citrus Bowl	#10 Auburn	16	USC	7	51,113
42	January 1, 1988	Florida Citrus Bowl	#14 Clemson	35	#20 Penn State	10	53,152
43	January 2, 1989	Florida Citrus Bowl	#9 Clemson	13	#10 Oklahoma	6	53,571
44	January 1, 1990	Florida Citrus Bowl	#11 Illinois	31	#16 Virginia	21	60,016
45	January 1, 1991	Florida Citrus Bowl	#2 Georgia Tech	45	#19 Nebraska	21	72,328
46	January 1, 1992	Florida Citrus Bowl	#14 California	37	#13 Clemson	13	64,192
47	January 1, 1993	Florida Citrus Bowl	#8 Georgia	21	#15 Ohio State	14	65,861
48	January 1, 1994	Florida Citrus Bowl	#13 Penn State	31	#6 Tennessee	13	72,456
49	January 2, 1995	Florida Citrus Bowl	#6 Alabama	24	#13 Ohio State	17	71,195
50	January 1, 1996	Florida Citrus Bowl	T-#4 Tennessee	20	T-#4 Ohio State	14	70,797
51	January 1, 1997	Florida Citrus Bowl	#9 Tennessee	48	#11 Northwestern	28	63,467
52	January 1, 1998	Florida Citrus Bowl	#6 Florida	21	#11 Penn State	6	72,940
53	January 1, 1999	Florida Citrus Bowl	#15 Michigan	45	#11 Arkansas	31	67,584
54	January 1, 2000	Florida Citrus Bowl	#9 Michigan State	37	#10 Florida	34	62,011
55	January 1, 2001	Florida Citrus Bowl	#17 Michigan	31	#20 Auburn	28	66,928
56	January 1, 2002	Florida Citrus Bowl	#8 Tennessee	45	#17 Michigan	17	59,653
57	January 1, 2003	Capital One Bowl	#19 Auburn	13	#10 Penn State	9	66,334
58	January 1, 2004	Capital One Bowl	#11 Georgia	34	#12 Purdue	27 (OT)	64,565
59	January 1, 2005	Capital One Bowl	#11 Iowa	30	#12 LSU	25	70,229
60	January 2, 2006	Capital One Bowl	#20 Wisconsin	24	#7 Auburn	10	57,221
NCAA Division I FBS
61	January 1, 2007	Capital One Bowl	#5 Wisconsin	17	#13 Arkansas	14	60,774
62	January 1, 2008	Capital One Bowl	Michigan	41	#12 Florida	35	69,748
63	January 1, 2009	Capital One Bowl	#15 Georgia	24	#18 Michigan State	12	59,681
64	January 1, 2010	Capital One Bowl	#11 Penn State	19	#15 LSU	17	63,025
65	January 1, 2011	Capital One Bowl	#16 Alabama	49	#9 Michigan State	7	61,519
66	January 2, 2012	Capital One Bowl	#9 South Carolina	30	#20 Nebraska	13	61,351
67	January 1, 2013	Capital One Bowl	#6 Georgia	45	#23 Nebraska	31	59,712
68	January 1, 2014	Capital One Bowl	#9 South Carolina	34	#19 Wisconsin	24	56,629
69	January 1, 2015	Citrus Bowl	#16 Missouri	33	#25 Minnesota	17	48,624
70	January 1, 2016	Citrus Bowl	#14 Michigan	41	#19 Florida	7	63,113
71	December 31, 2016	Citrus Bowl	#20 LSU	29	#13 Louisville	9	46,063
72	January 1, 2018	Citrus Bowl	#14 Notre Dame	21	#17 LSU	17	57,726
73	January 1, 2019	Citrus Bowl	#16 Kentucky	27	#13 Penn State	24	59,167
74	January 1, 2020	Citrus Bowl	#9 Alabama	35	#17 Michigan	16	59,746
75	January 1, 2021	Citrus Bowl	#15 Northwestern	35	Auburn	19	13,039
76	January 1, 2022	Citrus Bowl	#25 Kentucky	20	#17 Iowa	17	50,769
77	January 2, 2023	Citrus Bowl	#16 LSU	63	Purdue	7	42,791
78	January 1, 2024	Citrus Bowl	#25 Tennessee	35	#20 Iowa	0	43,861
79	December 31, 2024	Citrus Bowl	#21 Illinois	21	#14 South Carolina	17	47,129
80	December 31, 2025	Citrus Bowl	#14 Texas	41	#18 Michigan	27	47,316

== MVPs ==
Multiple players were recognized in some games – detail, where known, is denoted with B (outstanding back), L (outstanding lineman), O (outstanding offensive player), D (outstanding defensive player), or M (overall MVP) per contemporary newspaper reports.

Game	MVP(s)	Team	Pos.	Type
Jan. 1949	Dale McDaniel	Murray State	HB	
Jan. 1949	Ted Scown	Sul Ross State	HB	
Jan. 1950	Don Henigin	St. Vincent	FB	
Jan. 1950	Chick Davis	Emory & Henry	QB	
Jan. 1951	Pete Anania	Morris Harvey	QB	
Jan. 1951	Charles Hubbard	Morris Harvey	E	
Jan. 1952	Bill Johnson	Stetson	QB	
Jan. 1952	Dave Laude	Stetson	E	
Jan. 1953	Marvin Brown	East Texas State	HB	
Jan. 1954	Bobby Spann	Arkansas State	QB	
Jan. 1955	Bill Englehardt	Omaha	HB	
Jan. 1956	Barry Drexler	Juniata	E	
Jan. 1957	Ron Mills	West Texas State	HB	
Jan. 1958	Norman Roberts	East Texas State	E	
Dec. 1958	Sam McCord	East Texas State	QB	
Jan. 1960	Bob Waters	Presbyterian	QB	
Dec. 1960	Jerry Nettles	Citadel	QB	
Dec. 1961	Ralph Stone	Lamar	HB	
Dec. 1962	Billy Roland	Houston	QB	
Dec. 1963	Sharon Miller	Western Kentucky	QB	
Dec. 1964	Bill Cline	East Carolina	TB	
Dec. 1965	Dave Alexander	East Carolina	FB	
Dec. 1966	Willie Lanier	Morgan State	LB	
Dec. 1967	Errol Hook	Tennessee–Martin	QB	O
Dec. 1967	Gordon Lambert	Tennessee–Martin	DE	D
Dec. 1968	Buster O'Brien	Richmond	QB	B
Dec. 1968	Walker Gillette	Richmond	SE	L
Dec. 1969	Chuck Ealey	Toledo	QB	B
Dec. 1969	Dan Crockett	Toledo	WB	L
Dec. 1970	Chuck Ealey	Toledo	QB	O
Dec. 1970	Vince Hubler	William & Mary	LB	D
Dec. 1971	Chuck Ealey	Toledo	QB	B
Dec. 1971	Mel Long	Toledo	DT	L
Dec. 1972	Freddie Solomon	Tampa	QB	B
Dec. 1972	Jack Lambert	Kent State	LB	L
Dec. 1973	Chuck Varner	Miami (OH)	FB	B
Dec. 1973	Brad Cousino	Miami (OH)	MG	L
Dec. 1974	Sherman Smith	Miami (OH)	QB	B
Dec. 1974	Brad Cousino	Miami (OH)	MG	L
Dec. 1974	John Roudabush	Miami (OH)	LB	L
Dec. 1975	Rob Carpenter	Miami (OH)	TB	O
Dec. 1975	Jeff Kelly	Miami (OH)	MG	D
Dec. 1976	Terry Miller	Oklahoma State	HB	M, O
Dec. 1976	Phillip Dokes	Oklahoma State	DT	D
Dec. 1977	Jimmy Jordan	Florida State	QB	M, O
Dec. 1977	Willie Jones	Florida State	LB	D
Dec. 1978	Ted Brown	North Carolina State	RB	M
Dec. 1978	Nathan Ritter	North Carolina State	K	O
Dec. 1978	John Stanton	North Carolina State	MG	D
Dec. 1979	David Woodley	LSU	QB	M
Dec. 1979	Jerry Murphree	LSU	RB	O
Dec. 1979	Benjy Thibodeaux	LSU	DT	D

Game	MVP(s)	Team	Pos.	Type
Dec. 1980	Cris Collinsworth	Florida	WR	M
Dec. 1980	Charlie Wysocki	Florida	RB	O
Dec. 1980	David Galloway	Florida	DT	D
Dec. 1981	Jeff Gaylord	Missouri	LB	
Dec. 1982	Randy Campbell	Auburn	QB	
Dec. 1983	Johnnie Jones	Tennessee	RB	
Dec. 1984	James Jackson	Georgia	QB	
Dec. 1985	Larry Kolic	Ohio State	LB	
Jan. 1987	Aundray Bruce	Auburn	LB	
Jan. 1988	Rodney Williams	Clemson	QB	
Jan. 1989	Terry Allen	Clemson	RB	
Jan. 1990	Jeff George	Illinois	QB	
Jan. 1991	Shawn Jones	Georgia Tech	QB	
Jan. 1992	Mike Pawlawski	California	QB	
Jan. 1993	Garrison Hearst	Georgia	RB	
Jan. 1994	Bobby Engram	Penn State	WR	
Jan. 1995	Sherman Williams	Alabama	RB	
Jan. 1996	Jay Graham	Tennessee	RB	
Jan. 1997	Peyton Manning	Tennessee	QB	
Jan. 1998	Fred Taylor	Florida	RB	
Jan. 1999	Anthony Thomas	Michigan	RB	
Jan. 2000	Plaxico Burress	Michigan State	WR	
Jan. 2001	Anthony Thomas	Michigan	RB	
Jan. 2002	Casey Clausen	Tennessee	QB	
Jan. 2003	Ronnie Brown	Auburn	RB	
Jan. 2004	David Greene	Georgia	QB	
Jan. 2005	Drew Tate	Iowa	QB	
Jan. 2006	Brian Calhoun	Wisconsin	RB	
Jan. 2007	John Stocco	Wisconsin	QB	
Jan. 2008	Chad Henne	Michigan	QB	
Jan. 2009	Matthew Stafford	Georgia	QB	
Jan. 2010	Daryll Clark	Penn State	QB	
Jan. 2011	Courtney Upshaw	Alabama	LB	
Jan. 2012	Alshon Jeffery	South Carolina	WR	
Jan. 2013	Aaron Murray	Georgia	QB	
Jan. 2014	Connor Shaw	South Carolina	QB	
Jan. 2015	Markus Golden	Missouri	DE	
Jan. 2016	Jake Rudock	Michigan	QB	
Dec. 2016	Derrius Guice	LSU	RB	
Jan. 2018	Miles Boykin	Notre Dame	WR	
Jan. 2019	Benny Snell	Kentucky	RB	
Jan. 2020	Jerry Jeudy	Alabama	WR	
Jan. 2021	Peyton Ramsey	Northwestern	QB	
Jan. 2022	Wan'Dale Robinson	Kentucky	WR	
Jan. 2023	Malik Nabers	LSU	WR	
Jan. 2024	Nico Iamaleava	Tennessee	QB	
Dec. 2024	Josh McCray	Illinois	RB	
Dec. 2025	Arch Manning	Texas	QB	

Three players have been recognized in multiple games; Chuck Ealey of Toledo (1969, 1970, 1971), Brad Cousino of Miami (OH) (1973, 1974), and Anthony Thomas of Michigan (1999, 2001).

== Most appearances ==
Tennessee has the most wins by a single team with 5. Florida and Penn State have the most losses by a single team with 4.

Updated through the December 2025 edition (78 games, 156 total appearances).

Teams with multiple appearances

Rank	Team	Appearances	Record	Win pct.
1	Michigan	7	4–3	.571
T2	Tennessee	6	5–1	.833
T2	Georgia	6	4–1–1	.750
T2	Auburn	6	3–3	.500
T2	LSU	6	3–3	.500
T2	Florida	6	2–4	.333
T2	Penn State	6	2–4	.333
T8	East Texas State	4	3-0–1	.875
T8	Miami (Ohio)	4	3–1	.750
T8	South Carolina	4	2–2	.500
T8	Ohio State	4	1–3	.250
T12	Alabama	3	3–0	1.000
T12	Toledo	3	3–0	1.000
T12	Clemson	3	2–1	.667
T12	Wisconsin	3	2–1	.667
T12	Iowa	3	1–2	.333
T12	Michigan State	3	1–2	.333
T12	Nebraska	3	0–3	.000
T12	Southern Miss	3	0–3	.000

Rank	Team	Appearances	Record	Win pct.
T20	Catawba	2	2–0	1.000
T20	East Carolina	2	2–0	1.000
T20	Missouri	2	2–0	1.000
T20	Kentucky	2	2–0	1.000
T20	Illinois	2	2–0	1.000
T20	Middle Tennessee	2	1–1	.500
T20	Northwestern	2	1–1	.500
T20	Richmond	2	1–1	.500
T20	Arkansas State	2	0–1–1	.250
T20	Florida State	2	0–1–1	.250
T20	Missouri Valley	2	0–1–1	.250
T20	Arkansas	2	0–2	.000
T20	BYU	2	0–2	.000
T20	Emory and Henry	2	0–2	.000
T20	Maryland	2	0–2	.000
T20	Purdue	2	0–2	.000
T20	Tennessee Tech	2	0–2	.000
T20	West Chester	2	0–2	.000

Teams with a single appearance

Won (18): California, Georgia Tech, Houston, Lamar, Morgan State, Morris Harvey, NC State, Notre Dame, Oklahoma State, Omaha, Saint Vincent, Stetson, Tampa, UT Martin, Texas, The Citadel, West Texas A&M, Western Kentucky
Lost (23): Boston College, Coast Guard, Davidson, Eastern Kentucky, Juniata, Kent State, Louisville, Maine, Marshall, Maryville, Massachusetts, Minnesota, Murray State, Ohio, Oklahoma, Pittsburgh, Presbyterian, Sul Ross State, Texas Tech, USC, Virginia, Wake Forest, William & Mary

== Appearances by conference ==
Note: this table reflects games played since 1968, when the bowl started hosting major college teams.

Updated through the December 2025 edition (58 games, 116 total appearances).

Conference	Record					Appearances by season		
Conference	Games	W	L	T	Win pct.	Won	Lost	Tied
SEC	42	26	15	1	.631	1979, 1980, 1982, 1983, 1986*, 1992*, 1994*, 1995*, 1996*, 1997*, 2001*, 2002*, 2003*, 2008*, 2010*, 2011*, 2012*, 2013*, 2014*, 2016, 2018*, 2019*, 2021*, 2022*, 2023*, 2025	1973, 1974, 1993*, 1998*, 1999*, 2000*, 2004*, 2005*, 2006*, 2007*, 2009*, 2015*, 2017*, 2020*, 2024	1984
Big Ten	34	14	20	0	.412	1985, 1989*, 1993*, 1998*, 1999*, 2000*, 2004*, 2005*, 2006*, 2007*, 2009*, 2015*, 2020*, 2024	1992*, 1994*, 1995*, 1996*, 1997*, 2001*, 2002*, 2003*, 2008*, 2010*, 2011*, 2012*, 2013*, 2014*, 2018*, 2019*, 2021*, 2022*, 2023*, 2025	
ACC	10	4	6	0	.400	1978, 1987*, 1988*, 1990*	1979, 1980, 1983, 1989*, 1991*, 2016	
Independents	9	3	5	1	.389	1972, 1977, 2017*	1975, 1978, 1981, 1982, 1987*	1984
MAC	8	6	2	0	.750	1969, 1970, 1971, 1973, 1974, 1975	1968, 1972	
Big Eight	4	2	2	0	.500	1976, 1981	1988*, 1990*	
SoCon	4	1	3	0	.250	1968	1969, 1970, 1971	
Pac-10	2	1	1	0	.500	1991*	1986*	
WAC	2	0	2	0	.000		1976, 1985	
SWC	1	0	1	0	.000		1977	

- Games marked with an asterisk (*) were played in January of the following calendar year.
- Records are based on a team's conference affiliation at the time the game was played; for example, Penn State has appeared both as a Big Ten team and as an Independent team.
- Conferences that are defunct or not currently active in FBS are marked in italics.
- Independent appearances: Boston College (1982), Florida State (1977, 1984), Notre Dame (2017*), Penn State (1987*), Pittsburgh (1978), South Carolina (1975), Southern Miss (1981), and Tampa (1972).

== Game records ==
Team	Performance vs. Opponent	Year
Most points scored (one team)	63, LSU vs. Purdue	2023
Most points scored (both teams)	91, Richmond (49) vs. Ohio (42)	1968
Most points scored (losing team)	42, Ohio vs. Richmond	1968
Fewest points scored (winning team)	7, most recently: Omaha (7) vs. Eastern Kentucky (6)	1955
Fewest points scored (both teams)	7, Catawba (7) vs. Marshall (0)	1948
Fewest points allowed	0, most recently: Tennessee (35) vs. Iowa (0)	2024
Largest margin of victory	56, LSU (63) vs. Purdue (7)	2023
Total yards	594, LSU vs. Purdue	2023
Rushing yards	375, Oklahoma State vs. BYU	1976
Passing yards	455, Florida State vs. Texas Tech	1977
First downs	32, Richmond vs. Ohio	1968
Fewest yards allowed		
Fewest rushing yards allowed		
Fewest passing yards allowed		
Individual	Record, Player, Team	Year
All-purpose yards		
Touchdowns (overall)		
Rushing yards	234, Fred Taylor (Florida)	1998
Rushing touchdowns	4, Terry Miller (Oklahoma State)	1976
Passing yards	447, Buster O'Brien (Richmond)	1968
Passing touchdowns	5, Aaron Murray (Georgia)	2013
Receiving yards	242, Walker Gillette (Richmond)	1968
Receiving touchdowns	3, shared by: Plaxico Burress (Michigan State); Travis Taylor (Florida); Todd Snyder (Ohio)	2000; 2000; 1968
Tackles	17, shared by: Te'von Coney (Notre Dame); Eric Wilson (Maryland)	2018; 1983
Sacks		
Interceptions	2, most recently: Ty'Anthony Smith (Texas)	2025
Long Plays	Record, Player, Team	Year
Touchdown run	78 yds., Russell Hansbrough (Missouri)	2015
Touchdown pass	87 yds., Aaron Murray to Chris Conley (Georgia)	2013
Kickoff return	102 yds., Dave Lowert (BYU)	1976
Punt return	78 yds., Renard Harmon (Kent State)	1972
Interception return	99 yds., Quad Wilson (LSU)	2023
Fumble return		
Punt	71 yds., shared by: Blake Gillikin (Penn State); Jay Jones (Richmond)	2019; 1971
Field goal	57 yds., Quinn Nordin (Michigan)	2020
Miscellaneous	Record, Team vs. Team	Year
Bowl attendance	73,328, Georgia Tech vs. Nebraska	1991

== Media coverage ==
The bowl has been broadcast by Mizlou (1976–1983), NBC (1984–1985), and ABC since then, with the exception of ESPN for the 2011 and 2012 editions. Broadcast information for earlier editions of the bowl is lacking.
