= 1946 Catawba Indians football team =

American college football season

1946 Catawba Indians football

NSC champion Tangerine Bowl champion

Tangerine Bowl, W 31–6 vs. Maryville (TN)
- Conference: North State Conference
- Record: 10–2 (5–0 NSC)
- Head coach: Gordon Kirkland (13th season)
- Home stadium: Shuford Field

1946 North State Conference football standings
| | Conf. | | | | | Overall |
| Team | W | | L | | T | W | | L | | T |
|---|---|---|---|---|---|---|---|---|---|---|
| Catawba $ | 5 | – | 0 | – | 0 | 10 | – | 2 | – | 0 |
| Appalachian State | 4 | – | 1 | – | 0 | 6 | – | 3 | – | 0 |
| High Point | 3 | – | 2 | – | 1 | 7 | – | 2 | – | 1 |
| Western Carolina | 1 | – | 1 | – | 1 | 6 | – | 3 | – | 1 |
| Lenoir Rhyne | 3 | – | 5 | – | 0 | 5 | – | 6 | – | 0 |
| Guilford | 1 | – | 2 | – | 1 | 6 | – | 2 | – | 1 |
| Elon | 1 | – | 4 | – | 1 | 4 | – | 5 | – | 1 |
| Atlantic Christian | 0 | – | 3 | – | 0 | 2 | – | 4 | – | 1 |
$ – Conference champion

The 1946 Catawba Indians football team was an American football team that represented Catawba College as a member of the North State Conference (NSC) during the 1946 college football season. In its 13th season under head coach Gordon Kirkland, the team compiled a 10–2 record, defeated the Maryville Scots in the 1947 Tangerine Bowl, shut out 5 of 12 opponents, and outscored opponents by a total of 282 to 67.

Anthony Georgiana led the team in scoring with 66 points on 11 touchdowns.

== Schedule ==
| Date | Opponent | Site | Result | Attendance | Source |
|---|---|---|---|---|---|
| September 14 | Cherry Point Marines* | Shuford Field; Salisbury, NC | W 29–7 | | |
| September 21 | at VMI* | Alumni Field; Lexington, VA | L 7–21 | 4,000 | |
| September 28 | Eastern Kentucky* | Shuford Field; Salisbury, NC | W 9–7 | | |
| October 5 | at High Point | High Point, NC | W 19–7 | | |
| October 12 | at Wofford* | Spartanburg, SC | W 46–0 | 2,000 | |
| October 19 | vs. Appalachian State | Bowman Gray Stadium; Winston-Salem, NC | W 28–6 | 10,000 | |
| October 26 | vs. Elon | Bowman Gray Stadium; Winston-Salem, NC | W 40–0 | | |
| November 2 | Presbyterian* | Shuford Field; Salisbury, NC | L 12–13 | | |
| November 8 | at Newberry* | Newberry, SC | W 6–0 | | |
| November 16 | Guilford | Shuford Field; Salisbury, NC | W 28–0 | | |
| November 28 | Lenoir–Rhyne | Shuford Field; Salisbury, NC | W 27–0 | | |
| January 1, 1947 | vs. Maryville (TN)* | Orlando Stadium; Orlando, FL (Tangerine Bowl) | W 31–6 | 9,000 | |
*Non-conference game
