= Cam Henderson =

American sports coach and college athletics administrator

- Henderson at Marshall University in 1936

Biographical details
- Born: February 5, 1890; Joetown, West Virginia, U.S.
- Died: May 3, 1956 (aged 66); Richmond, Kentucky, U.S.

Coaching career (HC unless noted)

Football
- 1920–1922: Muskingum
- 1923–1934: Davis & Elkins
- 1935–1949: Marshall

Basketball
- 1920–1923: Muskingum
- 1923–1935: Davis & Elkins
- 1935–1955: Marshall

Baseball
- 1938: Marshall

Administrative career (AD unless noted)
- 1935–1948: Marshall

Head coaching record
- Overall: 164–91–13 (college football); 621–234 (college basketball); 6–3 (college baseball)
- Bowls: 1–0

Accomplishments and honors

Championships
- Football; WVIAC (1933); Buckeye (1937) Basketball; NAIA (1947)

Eli Camden Henderson (February 5, 1890 – May 3, 1956) was an American football, basketball, and baseball coach and college athletics administrator. He served as the head football coach at Muskingum College (1920–1922), Davis & Elkins College (1923–1934), and Marshall University (1935–1949), compiling a career college football record of 164–91–13. Henderson was also the head basketball coach at Muskingum (1920–1923), Davis & Elkins (1923–1935), and Marshall (1935–1955), tallying a career college basketball mark of 621–234. As a coach in basketball, he originated the fast break and the 2–3 zone defense, hallmarks of the modern game.

== Early life and education ==
Henderson was born in 1890 in the small town of Joetown in Marion County, West Virginia. He graduated from Glenville State Normal School—now known as Glenville State University–in 1911.

== High school coaching career ==
Henderson began coaching at Shinnston High School in rural West Virginia, then moved to Bristol, West Virginia, where no gymnasium existed on his arrival. Henderson managed to have a gym constructed there, but poorly-cured wood and a leaky roof resulted in a slippery floor. Henderson began to distribute his defenders in "zones" to avoid the slick spots. He then developed an offense of "breaking fast" off a missed basketball, with two forwards tearing down each sideline and a point guard bringing the ball up the court quickly for a number of options. Henderson is credited with the creation of the 2–3 zone defense and the fast break in basketball.

== College coaching career ==
Henderson moved on to a head coaching position in football and basketball at Muskingum College in Ohio in 1920, but his greatest glory came during the period of 1923 to 1934 as head basketball and football coach of Davis & Elkins College in Elkins, West Virginia. Henderson coached the first undefeated (22–0) West Virginia collegiate basketball team (1924–25) at Davis & Elkins and coached the first (proclaimed) D&E state collegiate football championship team in 1928. Henderson's 1933 team won the West Virginia Athletic Conference title. At Davis & Elkins, Henderson had a 220–40 record in basketball and an 81–33–6 record in football. His Davis & Elkins football teams beat much larger schools like West Virginia University, Army, Fordham, Villanova, George Washington and Navy.

=== Marshall ===
Henderson assumed a position at Marshall College, now Marshall University, in 1935, after Marshall had hired Dr. John Allen from D&E to be President of Marshall. Henderson was hired as athletic director and head coach for basketball and football. Henderson would win 68 football games and one Buckeye Conference title (a 9–0–1 season in 1937). He sent the Thundering Herd to the 1948 Tangerine Bowl and he produced College Football Hall of Fame running back Jackie Hunt, who set the national scoring mark with 27 touchdowns in 1940. His basketball teams won 368 games and won the Buckeye Conference in 1936–37, 1937–38 and 1938–39, the final year for the league. He won 35 straight home games from 1944 to 1947, started the 1946–47 season 17–0, then went on to a 32–5 mark and Marshall's only national championship in basketball in the NAIB (today's NAIA) Basketball Tournament in Kansas City, Missouri. Henderson also sent teams to the 1938 and 1948 tournament. His 1947–48 team won the Helms Foundation's Los Angeles Invitational by defeating Syracuse, 46–44.

Henderson's first All-Americans were Bill Smith for football (1937) and Jule Rivlin for basketball (1940). He sent numerous players to the professional ranks, including Frank "Gunner" Gatski (Marshall 1940–42), who is the first of the Herd's two members of the Pro Football Hall of Fame in Canton, Ohio. Gatski went on to play in 11 title games in 12 seasons with the Cleveland Browns (1946–56) and Detroit Lions (1957), winning four All-American Football Conference and three NFL titles with the Browns and one NFL title with the Lions. Henderson also recruited the first African-American to play at the formerly all-white colleges of West Virginia when he signed Hal Greer from Huntington in 1954. Greer helped Marshall to the Mid-American Conference (MAC) title in 1955–56, then led the nation in scoring in 1957–58 with 88 points per game. Greer signed with the Syracuse Nationals of the NBA, but went on to greatest glory with the Philadelphia 76ers by winning the title in 1966–67 and becoming a multi-year All-Star and MVP of the 1968 All-Star game. Greer, named as one of the top 50 players in the NBA 50th Anniversary, averaged 19 points per game (1,122 games played), five rebounds and four assists and was inducted into the Naismith Basketball Hall of Fame in 1982.

Marshall had three basketball wins over Tennessee and Colorado during Henderson's tenure. They beat the Dayton Flyers 17 times and topped teams like BYU, South Carolina, Cincinnati, Long Island, St. Francis, St. Louis, Loyola, Virginia Tech, Cal, Louisville, Denver, Wichita State, Miami-Florida, City College of New York, Xavier, Indiana State, Maryland, Murray State, Western Kentucky, Kansas State, Creighton, Hawaii, Washington, Idaho, Evansville, Pepperdine, Texas A&M, Memphis (State), Southern Miss and Virginia. Over 20 seasons they had only one losing campaign, going 6–10 in Henderson's first year. His teams won as many as 32 games and they won 20 or more games eight times. He produced the first-ever first round draft pick for the NBA, Andy Tonkovich, and produced All-Americans like Walt Walowac (two-times on Helms Foundation Teams, first in 1953, third in 1954 and scored 1,982 career points). NAIB All-Americans in 1947 and 1948 included Gene James, who played in the NBA, Bill Hall, Bill Toothman, Marvin Gutshall and Tonkovich. Rivlin was on the AP Little All-American team in 1940. Charlie Slack set a still-standing NCAA record of 25.4 rebounds per game for Henderson's final team in 1954–55, and finished his career with 1,916 rebounds and 1,551 points in four seasons. Slack and Walowac played for the Goodyear Winged Foots of Akron, Ohio, in national and international AAU contests, and Slack was an alternate for the 1960 Olympic team.

After a 6–4 season in 1949, Director of Athletics Luther Poling asked Henderson to resign his football position. Henderson would remain at Marshall as head basketball coach until 1955. His championship basketball team of 1947 spurred the move into the new Cabell County Veteran's Memorial Field House, a 6,500-seat arena that was Marshall's home from 1950 to 1980. His final team in 1954–55 was 18–4, but the MAC prevented Marshall from accepting an invitation to the National Invitational Tournament. Henderson's failing health from diabetes forced him to step down after the season and he would die that summer.

=== Awards ===
Marshall has a Cam Henderson Award for the top student-athlete and the building that houses the athletic department and the 9,000-seat Marshall basketball arena are named the Cam Henderson Center. In 2007, Emmy Award-winning producer and director Deborah Novak and John Witek released "Cam Henderson: A Coach's Story" on public television and DVD to great acclaim. The film was honored with a first place Platinum Award at the Worldfest of Film in Houston, Texas.

Cam Henderson has been inducted into the Helms Foundation Hall of Fame, the West Virginia Sports Writers Hall of Fame, the D&E Hall of Fame, the Marshall Hall of Fame and the NAIA Hall of Fame.

== Death ==
Henderson died on May 3, 1956, while visiting his daughter in Richmond, Kentucky. He had suffered a heart attack several months before in Huntington and spent several weeks recovering in a hospital there.

== Head coaching record ==
=== College football ===
Year	Team	Overall	Conference	Standing	Bowl/playoffs
Muskingum Fighting Muskies (Independent) (1920–1921)
1920	Muskingum	4–4			
1921	Muskingum	4–3–2			
Muskingum Fighting Muskies (Ohio Athletic Conference) (1922)
1922	Muskingum	4–5	1–4	17th	
Muskingum:		12–12–2	1–4		
Davis & Elkins Senators (Independent) (1923–1924)
1923	Davis & Elkins	8–0			
1924	Davis & Elkins	8–2–1			
Davis & Elkins Senators (West Virginia Intercollegiate Athletic Conference) (1924–1934)
1925	Davis & Elkins	7–3	4–2	T–4th	
1926	Davis & Elkins	4–4	3–2	T–5th	
1927	Davis & Elkins	5–5	3–1	T–3rd	
1928	Davis & Elkins	7–2–1	3–0	NA	
1929	Davis & Elkins	10–1–1	3–0	NA	
1930	Davis & Elkins	6–4–1	1–0	NA	
1931	Davis & Elkins	10–1	2–0	NA	
1932	Davis & Elkins	6–5	2–0	NA	
1933	Davis & Elkins	9–1–1	5–0	1st	
1934	Davis & Elkins	4–5–1	1–1	NA	
Davis & Elkins:		84–33–6	27–6		
Marshall Thundering Herd (Buckeye Athletic Association / West Virginia Intercollegiate Athletic Conference) (1935–1938)
1935	Marshall	4–6	0–5 / 2–1	6th / NA	
1936	Marshall	6–3–1	2–2–1 / 1–1	3rd / NA	
1937	Marshall	9–0–1	4–0–1 / 2–0	1st / NA	
1938	Marshall	5–4	2–2 / 0–0	3rd / NA	
Marshall Thundering Herd (West Virginia Intercollegiate Athletic Conference) (1939–1947)
1939	Marshall	9–2	3–0	NA	
1940	Marshall	8–2	2–0	NA	
1941	Marshall	7–1	0–0	NA	
1942	Marshall	1–7–1	0–1	NA	
1943	No team—World War II				
1944	No team—World War II				
1945	No team—World War II				
1946	Marshall	2–7–1	2–0	NA	
1947	Marshall	9–3	1–0	NA	L Tangerine
Marshall Thundering Herd (Ohio Valley Conference) (1948–1949)
1948	Marshall	2–7–1			
1949	Marshall	6–4	4–0		
Marshall:		68–46–5	25–12–2		
Total:		164–91–13			
National championship Conference title Conference division title or championship game berth

=== College basketball ===
Record table
Season	Team	Overall	Conference	Standing	Postseason
Muskingum Fighting Muskies (Independent) (1920–1922)
1920–21	Muskingum	20–4			
1921–22	Muskingum	8–10			
Muskingum Fighting Muskies (Ohio Athletic Conference) (1922–1923)
1922–23	Muskingum	6–11			
Muskingum:		34–25 (.576)			
Davis & Elkins Scarlet Hurricane (Independent) (1923–1924)
1923–24	Davis & Elkins	10–7			
Davis & Elkins Scarlet Hurricane (West Virginia Intercollegiate Athletic Conference) (1924–1935)
1924–25	Davis & Elkins	22–0			
1925–26	Davis & Elkins	15–4			
1926–27	Davis & Elkins	23–3			
1927–28	Davis & Elkins	14–4			
1928–29	Davis & Elkins	20–5			
1929–30	Davis & Elkins	22–3			
1930–31	Davis & Elkins	17–4			
1931–32	Davis & Elkins	19–2			
1932–33	Davis & Elkins	15–8			
1933–34	Davis & Elkins	11–6			
1934–35	Davis & Elkins	27–4			
Davis & Elkins:		225–50 (.818)			
Marshall Thundering Herd (Independent) (1935–1948)
1935–36	Marshall	6–10			
1936–37	Marshall	23–8			
1937–38	Marshall	28–4			NAIA Second Round
1938–39	Marshall	22–5			
1939–40	Marshall	26–3			
1940–41	Marshall	14–9			
1941–42	Marshall	15–9			
1942–43	Marshall	10–7			
1943–44	Marshall	15–7			
1944–45	Marshall	17–9			
1945–46	Marshall	24–10			
1946–47	Marshall	32–5			NAIA Champion
1947–48	Marshall	22–11			NAIA Second Round
Marshall Thundering Herd (Ohio Valley Conference) (1948–1952)
1948–49	Marshall	16–12	2–2	4th	
1949–50	Marshall	15–9	5–4	3rd	
1950–51	Marshall	13–13	2–6	6th	
1951–52	Marshall	15–11	5–7	4th	
Marshall Thundering Herd (Independent) (1952–1953)
1952–53	Marshall	20–4			
Marshall Thundering Herd (Mid-American Conference) (1953–1955)
1953–54	Marshall	12–9	6–7	4th	
1954–55	Marshall	17–4	10–4	2nd	
Marshall:		362–159 (.695)	30–30 (.500)		
Total:		621–234 (.726)			
National champion Postseason invitational champion Conference regular season champion Conference regular season and conference tournament champion Division regular season champion Division regular season and conference tournament champion Conference tournament champion

=== College baseball ===
Record table
Season	Team	Overall	Conference	Standing	Postseason
Marshall Thundering Herd (Independent) (1938)
1938	Marshall	6–3			
Marshall:		6–3 (.667)			
Total:		6–3 (.667)			

== See also ==
- List of college men's basketball coaches with 600 wins

== Bibliography ==
- Books:
  - Marshall University 2007–08 Men's Basketball Media Guide, Huntington, W.Virginia, Chapman Printing, 2007.
  - Marshall University 2007 Football Media Guide, Huntington, W.Virginia, Chapman Printing, 2007.
  - The Cam Henderson Story, Dr. Sam Clagg, Huntington, W.Virginia, Marshall University Press, 1981
  - Sports In West Virginia, Doug Huff, Donning Company/Publishers, Virginia Beach, Virginia, 1979
  - Marshall University: An Institution Comes Of Age 1837–1980, Dr. Charles Moffat, Marshall University Alumni Association, 1980
- DVD:
  - Cam Henderson: A Coach's Story, Deborah Novak/John Witek, West Virginia Public Broadcasting, 2007
  - Ashes To Glory, D. Novak/J. Witek, West Virginia Public Broadcasting, 2000
