= 1946 Appalachian State Mountaineers football team =

American college football season

1946 Appalachian State Mountaineers football
- Conference: North State Conference
- Record: 6–3 (4–1 NSC)
- Head coach: Flucie Stewart (2nd season)
- Home stadium: College Field

1946 North State Conference football standings
	Conf.					Overall
Team	W		L		T	W		L		T
Catawba $	5	–	0	–	0	10	–	2	–	0
Appalachian State	4	–	1	–	0	6	–	3	–	0
High Point	3	–	2	–	1	7	–	2	–	1
Western Carolina	1	–	1	–	1	6	–	3	–	1
Lenoir Rhyne	3	–	5	–	0	5	–	6	–	0
Guilford	1	–	2	–	1	6	–	2	–	1
Elon	1	–	4	–	1	4	–	5	–	1
Atlantic Christian	0	–	3	–	0	2	–	4	–	1
$ – Conference champion

The 1946 Appalachian State Mountaineers football team was an American football team that represented Appalachian State Teachers College (now known as Appalachian State University) as a member of the North State Conference during the 1946 college football season. In their second year under head coach Flucie Stewart, the Mountaineers compiled an overall record of 6–3, with a mark of 4–1 in conference play, and finished 2nd in the NSC.

== Schedule ==
Date	Opponent	Site	Result	Source
September 21	Newberry*	College Field; Boone, NC	W 28–19	
October 5	Elon	College Field; Boone, NC	W 40–0	
October 12	High Point	College Field; Boone, NC	W 10–6	
October 19	vs. Catawba	Bowman Gray Stadium; Winston-Salem, NC	L 6–28	
October 26	Erskine*	College Field; Boone, NC	W 50–6	
November 2	at Lenoir Rhyne	Moretz Stadium; Hickory, NC	W 19–7	
November 9	at Western Carolina	Cullowhee, NC (rivalry)	W 42–6	
November 16	at Milligan*	Roosevelt Field; Elizabethton, TN	L 0–6	
November 23	at Presbyterian*	Bailey Stadium; Clinton, SC	L 7–14	
*Non-conference game
