= 1947 Appalachian State Mountaineers football team =

American college football season

1947 Appalachian State Mountaineers football
- Conference: North State Conference
- Record: 9–1 (6–1 NSC)
- Head coach: E. C. Duggins (1st season)
- Home stadium: College Field

1947 North State Conference football standings
	Conf.					Overall
Team	W		L		T	W		L		T
Catawba $	6	–	0	–	0	11	–	1	–	0
Appalachian State	6	–	1	–	0	9	–	1	–	0
Lenoir Rhyne	4	–	3	–	1	5	–	4	–	1
High Point	3	–	3	–	1	5	–	4	–	2
Guilford	2	–	3	–	0	4	–	6	–	0
Western Carolina	2	–	3	–	0	3	–	5	–	1
Elon	2	–	5	–	0	4	–	6	–	0
East Carolina	1	–	3	–	0	3	–	6	–	0
Atlantic Christian	0	–	5	–	0	0	–	8	–	0
$ – Conference champion

The 1947 Appalachian State Mountaineers football team was an American football team that represented Appalachian State Teachers College (now known as Appalachian State University) as a member of the North State Conference during the 1947 college football season. In their first year under head coach E. C. Duggins, the Mountaineers compiled an overall record of 9–1, with a mark of 6–1 in conference play, and finished 2nd in the NSC.

In the final Litkenhous Ratings released in mid-December, Appalachian was ranked at No. 168 out of 500 college football teams.

== Schedule ==
Date	Opponent	Site	Result	Attendance	Source
September 20	vs. Guilford	Bowman Gray Stadium; Winston-Salem, NC	W 23–12	7,000	
September 27	at Newberry*	Setzler Field; Newberry, SC	W 18–7	2,500	
October 4	at Elon	Elon Park; Elon, NC	W 21–13	2,000	
October 11	Lenoir Rhyne	College Field; Boone, NC	W 22–0		
October 18	vs. Catawba	Bowman Gray Stadium; Winston-Salem, NC	L 0–19	9,000	
October 25	Atlantic Christian	College Field; Boone, NC	W 33–6		
November 1	Emory & Henry*	College Field; Boone, NC	W 19–0		
November 8	Western Carolina	College Field; Boone, NC (rivalry)	W 20–0		
November 15	at Milligan*	Roosevelt Field; Elizabethton, TN	W 27–0	4,000	
November 27	at High Point	Albion Millis Stadium; High Point, NC	W 12–7		
*Non-conference game
