= 1947 East Carolina Pirates football team =

American college football season

1947 East Carolina Pirates football
- Conference: North State Conference
- Record: 3–6 (1–3 NSC)
- Head coach: Jim Johnson (2nd season)
- Home stadium: Guy Smith Stadium

1947 North State Conference football standings
	Conf.					Overall
Team	W		L		T	W		L		T
Catawba $	6	–	0	–	0	11	–	1	–	0
Appalachian State	6	–	1	–	0	9	–	1	–	0
Lenoir Rhyne	4	–	3	–	1	5	–	4	–	1
High Point	3	–	3	–	1	5	–	4	–	2
Guilford	2	–	3	–	0	4	–	6	–	0
Western Carolina	2	–	3	–	0	3	–	5	–	1
Elon	2	–	5	–	0	4	–	6	–	0
East Carolina	1	–	3	–	0	3	–	6	–	0
Atlantic Christian	0	–	5	–	0	0	–	8	–	0
$ – Conference champion

The 1947 East Carolina Pirates football team was an American football team that represented East Carolina Teachers College (now known as East Carolina University) as a member of the North State Conference during the 1947 college football season. In their second season under head coach Jim Johnson, the team compiled a 3–6 record.

== Schedule ==
Date	Opponent	Site	Result	Source
September 27	Lenoir Rhyne	Guy Smith Stadium; Greenville, NC	L 9–27	
October 4	at Atlantic Christian	Municipal Stadium; Wilson, NC	W 12–7	
October 11	Elon	Guy Smith Stadium; Greenville, NC	L 0–7	
October 18	at Erskine*	Due West, SC	L 0–14	
October 24	at The Apprentice School*	Apprentice Field; Newport News, VA	W 14–6	
November 1	Fort Bragg*	Guy Smith Stadium; Greenville, NC	W 12–2	
November 8	NAB Little Creek*	Guy Smith Stadium; Greenville, NC	L 7–31	
November 21	NC State JV*	Guy Smith Stadium; Greenville, NC	L 12–20	
November 22	Milligan	Guy Smith Stadium; Greenville, NC	No contest	
November 29	at Western Carolina	Memorial Stadium; Cullowhee, NC	L 0–28	
*Non-conference game
