= 1947 Catawba Indians football team =

American college football season

1947 Catawba Indians football

NSC champion Tangerine Bowl champion

Tangerine Bowl, W 7–0 vs. Marshall
- Conference: North State Conference
- Record: 11–1 (6–0 NSC)
- Head coach: Gordon Kirkland (14th season)
- Home stadium: Shuford Field

1947 North State Conference football standings
	Conf.					Overall
Team	W		L		T	W		L		T
Catawba $	6	–	0	–	0	11	–	1	–	0
Appalachian State	6	–	1	–	0	9	–	1	–	0
Lenoir Rhyne	4	–	3	–	1	5	–	4	–	1
High Point	3	–	3	–	1	5	–	4	–	2
Guilford	2	–	3	–	0	4	–	6	–	0
Western Carolina	2	–	3	–	0	3	–	5	–	1
Elon	2	–	5	–	0	4	–	6	–	0
East Carolina	1	–	3	–	0	3	–	6	–	0
Atlantic Christian	0	–	5	–	0	0	–	8	–	0
$ – Conference champion

The 1947 Catawba Indians football team was an American football team that represented Catawba College as a member of the North State Conference (NSC) during the 1947 college football season. In its 14th season under head coach Gordon Kirkland, the team compiled an 11–1 record, won the NSC championship, defeated Marshall in the 1948 Tangerine Bowl, shut out 10 of 12 opponents, and outscored opponents by a total of 265 to 27.

On October 25, 1947, Catawba tied (and later broke) the national consecutive game scoring record. The prior record of 72 games was claimed by Yale during the 19th century. After losing to Catawba by a 39–0 score, Newberry's head coach Billy Laval said: "They've got a real ball club. Should be playing Furman, Clemson and Carolina. They're out of our league." In the AP poll released on December 1, 1947, Catawba was ranked No. 20.

Catawba fullback Lee Spears led the NSIC in scoring with 67 points (not counting the six points he scored in the Tangerine Bowl), and the team's place-kicking specialist Lamar Dorton led the conference in with 20 point-after-touchdown kicks.

Catawba was ranked at No. 117 (out of 500 college football teams) in the final Litkenhous Ratings for 1947.

== Schedule ==
Date	Opponent	Site	Result	Attendance	Source
September 13	82nd Airborne*	Shuford Field; Salisbury, NC	W 44–0	4,000	
September 20	Wofford*	Shuford Field; Salisbury, NC	W 14–0		
September 27	at VMI*	Alumni Field; Lexington, VA	L 6–13	4,000	
October 4	at High Point	High Point, NC	W 21–0		
October 11	Western Carolina	Shuford Field; Salisbury, NC	W 44–0		
October 18	vs. Appalachian State	Winston-Salem, NC	W 19–0	9,000	
October 25	Elon	Shuford Field; Salisbury, NC	W 38–0		
November 1	Presbyterian*^{†}	Shuford Field; Salisbury, NC	W 7–0	5,000	
November 7	Newberry*	Shuford Field; Salisbury, NC	W 39–0	1,500	
November 15	at Guilford	Greensboro, NC	W 20–14		
November 27	at Lenoir–Rhyne	Hickory, NC	W 6–0	6,000	
January 1, 1948	vs. Marshall*	Tangerine Bowl; Orlando, FL (Tangerine Bowl)	W 7–0	9,000	
*Non-conference game; ^{†}Homecoming

== Rankings ==
Ranking movements Legend: ██ Increase in ranking ██ Decrease in ranking — = Not ranked
	Week									
Poll	1	2	3	4	5	6	7	8	9	Final
AP	—	—	—	—	—	—	—	—	20	—
