= 1948 Appalachian State Mountaineers football team =

American college football season

1948 Appalachian State Mountaineers football

NSC champion

Burley Bowl, L 2–7 vs. West Chester
- Conference: North State Conference
- Record: 8–1–1 (7–0–1 NSC)
- Head coach: E. C. Duggins (2nd season)
- Home stadium: College Field

1948 North State Conference football standings
	Conf.					Overall
Team	W		L		T	W		L		T
Appalachian State $	7	–	0	–	1	8	–	1	–	1
Western Carolina	3	–	1	–	0	7	–	3	–	0
Catawba	5	–	2	–	0	5	–	4	–	1
Lenoir Rhyne	5	–	2	–	1	6	–	3	–	1
High Point	4	–	3	–	1	5	–	3	–	2
Elon	3	–	4	–	1	4	–	5	–	1
Guilford	1	–	5	–	0	4	–	6	–	0
Atlantic Christian	1	–	6	–	0	2	–	7	–	0
East Carolina	0	–	6	–	0	0	–	9	–	0
$ – Conference champion

The 1948 Appalachian State Mountaineers football team was an American football team that represented Appalachian State Teachers College (now known as Appalachian State University) as a member of the North State Conference during the 1948 college football season. In their second year under head coach E. C. Duggins, the Mountaineers compiled an overall record of 8–1–1, with a mark of 7–0–1 in conference play, and finished as NSC champion. State concluded their season with a loss against West Chester at the Burley Bowl.

Appalachian State was ranked at No. 231 in the final Litkenhous Difference by Score System ratings for 1948.

== Schedule ==
Date	Opponent	Site	Result	Attendance	Source
September 18	vs. Guilford	Bowman Gray Stadium; Winston-Salem, NC	W 21–14	3,000	
September 25	vs. Western Carolina	Memorial Stadium; Asheville, NC (rivalry)	W 14–13		
October 1	Elon	College Field; Boone, NC	W 33–13		
October 9	at Lenoir Rhyne	Moretz Stadium; Hickory, NC	T 14–14		
October 16	vs. Catawba	Bowman Gray Stadium; Winston-Salem, NC	W 20–13	7,000	
October 23	High Point	College Field; Boone, NC	W 40–14		
October 30	at Emory & Henry*	Municipal Stadium; Bristol, VA	W 24–14		
November 6	East Carolina	College Field; Boone, NC	W 47–0		
November 13	vs. Atlantic Christian	Rocky Mount, NC	W 27–6		
November 25	vs. West Chester*	Memorial Stadium; Johnson City, TN (Burley Bowl)	L 2–7	12,000	
*Non-conference game
