= 1948 East Carolina Pirates football team =

American college football season

1948 East Carolina Pirates football
- Conference: North State Conference
- Record: 0–9 (0–6 NSC)
- Head coach: Jim Johnson (3rd season)
- Home stadium: Guy Smith Stadium

1948 North State Conference football standings
	Conf.					Overall
Team	W		L		T	W		L		T
Appalachian State $	7	–	0	–	1	8	–	1	–	1
Western Carolina	3	–	1	–	0	7	–	3	–	0
Catawba	5	–	2	–	0	5	–	4	–	1
Lenoir Rhyne	5	–	2	–	1	6	–	3	–	1
High Point	4	–	3	–	1	5	–	3	–	2
Elon	3	–	4	–	1	4	–	5	–	1
Guilford	1	–	5	–	0	4	–	6	–	0
Atlantic Christian	1	–	6	–	0	2	–	7	–	0
East Carolina	0	–	6	–	0	0	–	9	–	0
$ – Conference champion

The 1948 East Carolina Pirates football team was an American football team that represented East Carolina Teachers College (now known as East Carolina University) as a member of the North State Conference during the 1948 college football season. In their third season under head coach Jim Johnson, the team compiled a 0–9 record.

== Schedule ==
Date	Opponent	Site	Result	Source
September 17	vs. Cherry Point Marines*	Municipal Stadium; Rocky Mount, NC	L 6–13	
September 25	at Lenoir Rhyne	Moretz Stadium; Hickory, NC	L 6–26	
October 8	at Elon	Elon Field; Elon, NC	L 0–6	
October 15	Western Carolina	Guy Smith Stadium; Greenville, NC	L 0–39	
October 22	at The Apprentice School*	Apprentice Field; Newport News, VA	L 6–20	
October 29	Duke JV*	Guy Smith Stadium; Greenville, NC	L 13–19	
November 6	at Appalachian State	College Field; Boone, NC	L 0–47	
November 13	vs. High Point	Wilmington, NC	L 7–30	
November 19	Atlantic Christian	Guy Smith Stadium; Greenville, NC	L 0–6	
*Non-conference game
