= Robert Spangler (American football) =

American football and basketball player and coach (1917–1992)

Biographical details
- Born: September 8, 1917
- Died: March 31, 1992 (aged 74)

Playing career

Football
- 1935–1938: Duke

Basketball
- 1936–1938: Duke
- Position: Quarterback (football)

Coaching career (HC unless noted)

Football
- 1940–1941: Newport News Builders
- 1946: Newport News Builders
- 1947–1948: Atlantic Christian
- 1949–1952: Catawba

Basketball
- 1951–1952: Catawba

Head coaching record
- Overall: 20–36–1 (college football); 4–19 (college basketball)

Robert F. Spangler (September 8, 1917 – March 31, 1992) was an American football and basketball player and coach. Following a successful played career as a quarterback at Duke University, he served as the head football coach at Atlantic Christian College—now known as Barton College—in Wilson, North Carolina from 1947 to 1948 and Catawba College in Salisbury, North Carolina from 1949 to 1952.

== Head coaching record ==
=== College football ===
Year	Team	Overall	Conference	Standing	Bowl/playoffs
Atlantic Christian Bulldogs (North State Conference) (1947–1948)
1947	Atlantic Christian	0–8	0–5	9th	
1948	Atlantic Christian	2–7	1–6	8th	
Atlantic Christian:		2–15	1–11		
Catawba Indians (North State Conference) (1949–1952)
1949	Catawba	5–5	4–2	4th	
1950	Catawba	4–6	2–3	5th	
1951	Catawba	5–5	3–2	3rd	
1952	Catawba	4–5–1	4–1–1	T–2nd	
Catawba:		18–21–1	13–8–1		
Total:		20–36–1			
