= Bill Crutchfield =

American football player and coach (1926–1982)

Biographical details
- Born: May 7, 1926; Orangeburg, South Carolina, U.S.
- Died: September 27, 1982 (aged 56); Tallahassee, Florida, U.S.

Playing career
- 1944–1945: North Carolina
- Position: Fullback

Coaching career (HC unless noted)
- 1947–1948: North Carolina (GA)
- 1949–1950: Atlantic Christian
- 1951–1952: Mansfield HS (OH) (assistant)
- 1953: Presbyterian (line)
- 1954–1956: Presbyterian
- 1957: Furman (backfield)
- 1958–1959: Wake Forest (DB)
- 1960–1963: Miami (FL) (DB)
- 1964–1966: Florida State (OC)
- 1967: Atlanta Falcons (RB)
- 1968–1969: Georgia Tech (OC)

Head coaching record
- Overall: 16–28–3

Bill Crutchfield (May 7, 1926 – September 27, 1982) was an American football college football coach. He served as the head football coach at Atlantic Christian College—now known as Barton College—from 1949 to 1950 and Presbyterian College from 1954 to 1956.

== Playing career ==
Crutchfield played college football for North Carolina as a fullback. He graduated in 1947.

== Coaching career ==
Crutchfield began his coaching career as a graduate assistant for his alma mater, North Carolina. In 1949, he was named head football coach for Atlantic Christian. In two seasons he led the team to a 3–14–2 record. He was the coach when the team discontinued football following the 1950 season. In 1951, he joined Mansfield High School as an assistant under head coach Bill Peterson. In 1953, Crutchfield was named line coach for Presbyterian. After one season he was promoted to head football coach. In three seasons he led the team to a 13–14–1 record. He resigned following the 1956 season. In 1957, he was hired as the backfield coach for Furman. After one season he was hired as the defensive backs coach for Wake Forest. In 1960, he took the same role for Miami (FL). In 1964, he rejoined Peterson as his offensive coordinator for Florida State. In 1967, Crutchfield was hired as the running backs coach for the Atlanta Falcons of the National Football League (NFL). He was fired after one season. In 1968, he was hired as the offensive coordinator for Georgia Tech. He maintained that position until 1969.

== Later career and death ==
Following Crutchfield's coaching career he took an administrative position with Florida State to assist Peterson.

Crutchfield died in Tallahassee, Florida on September 27, 1982, at the age of 56 following a short illness.

== Head coaching record ==
Year	Team	Overall	Conference	Standing	Bowl/playoffs
Atlantic Christian Bulldogs (North State Conference) (1947–1948)
1949	Atlantic Christian	1–7–2	0–5–2	8th	
1950	Atlantic Christian	2–7	0–5	8th	
Atlantic Christian:		3–14–2	0–10–2		
Presbyterian Blue Hose (South Carolina Little Three) (1954–1956)
1954	Presbyterian	6–3	1–1	2nd	
1955	Presbyterian	3–5–1	0–2	3rd	
1956	Presbyterian	4–6	0–2	3rd	
Presbyterian:		13–14–1	1–5		
Total:		16–28–3			
