= Chip Hester =

American football coach (born c. 1970)

Current position
- Title: Head coach
- Team: Barton
- Conference: Carolinas
- Record: 22–37

Biographical details
- Born: c. 1970 (age 55–56); Raleigh, North Carolina, U.S.
- Education: Guilford College (1992); Georgia Southern University (1993)

Playing career

Football
- 1989–1992: Guilford
- Position: Wide receiver

Coaching career (HC unless noted)

Football
- 1993: Millbrook HS (NC) (WR)
- 1994: Catawba (GA)
- 1995–2001: Catawba (WR)
- 2002–2012: Catawba
- 2014: North Carolina A&T (OA)
- 2015–2017: North Carolina A&T (OC)
- 2018–present: Barton

Golf
- 1996–1997: Catawba

Head coaching record
- Overall: 92–86 (football)
- Tournaments: 1–3 (NCAA D-II playoffs)

Accomplishments and honors

Championships
- 2 SAC (2003, 2007)

Chip Hester (born c. 1970) is an American college football coach. He is the head football coach for Barton College, a position he has held since 2018. He was the head football coach for Catawba College from 2002 to 2012. He also coached at Millbrook High School and North Carolina A&T. He played college football for Guilford as a wide receiver.

== Head coaching record ==
=== Football ===
Year	Team	Overall	Conference	Standing	Bowl/playoffs	AFCA^{#}
Catawba Indians (South Atlantic Conference) (2002–2012)
2002	Catawba	8–3	6–1	2nd	L NCAA Division II First Round	18
2003	Catawba	9–2	6–1	T–1st		11
2004	Catawba	7–4	4–3	T–2nd	L NCAA Division II First Round	
2005	Catawba	6–5	3–4	T–4th		
2006	Catawba	6–4	3–4	T–5th		
2007	Catawba	11–2	5–1	T–1st	L NCAA Division II Second Round	12
2008	Catawba	6–4	4–3	T–4th		
2009	Catawba	4–6	1–6	8th		
2010	Catawba	6–4	4–3	T–3rd		
2011	Catawba	3–8	2–5	T–6th		
2012	Catawba	4–7	2–5	6th		
Catawba:		70–49	40–36			
Barton Bulldogs (NCAA Division II independent) (2020–2021)
2020–21	Barton	0–4				
2021	Barton	6–5				
Barton Bulldogs (South Atlantic Conference) (2022–2024)
2022	Barton	4–7	3–6	5th (Piedmont)		
2023	Barton	6–5	3–5	T–4th (Piedmont)		
2024	Barton	3–8	2–6	5th (Piedmont)		
Barton Bulldogs (Conference Carolinas) (2025–present)
2025	Barton	3–8	3–3	T–3rd		
2026	Barton	0–0	0–0			
Barton:		22–37	11–20			
Total:		92–86				
National championship Conference title Conference division title or championship game berth
