= Monte (mascot) =

University of Montana's athletics mascot

- University: University of Montana
- Conference: BSC
- Description: Grizzly bear
- Origin of name: short for Montana
- First seen: 1993
- Related mascot(s): Monte's little buddy 'Mo', Monte's big buddy 'Rocky'

Monte, short for Montana, is the University of Montana's athletics mascot. He is modeled after a grizzly bear, in reference to the nickname of the university's athletic teams, the Grizzlies.

== History ==
Starting in 1897, the University of Montana used live bear cubs to promote their athletic teams, who were then simply known as the Bears. The university went through several bear cubs, often being forced to replace the bear at the end of every football season as it grew too large to be easily shuttled from game to game. The mascots had several different names through the years, including three bears named Fessy, in honor of famed University of Montana football coach Doug Fessden, and a bear named Jerry, in honor of coach Jerry Williams. However, live bear cubs were visibly uncomfortable during games, especially as the crowd grew loud. They would often be held in chains. Outside the sports arenas, the bears were occasionally subject to kidnappings, publicity hoaxes, and animal rights protests. One ran away successfully. Following a particularly poor football season in 1956, a rumor started that the school was euthanizing the bears.

Press and student outbursts at the complications of live bear mascots led the university to try a more conventional approach, and in the 1970s, the Grizzlies were backed by a variety of traditional company-sponsored costumed mascots. These included the Hamm's Beer Bear, Domino's Pizza's Noid, and at one point, Ronald McDonald. The local business Grizzly Auto Centers sponsored Otto the Grizzly, who was the primary mascot for the athletics teams for most of the 1980s, beginning in 1983 with student Jan Nesset. Like Otto, previous bear mascots were designed to be fierce and aggressive, even wolf-like; it wasn't until the athletics department conferred with mascot experts that it was decided to design a more engaging, friendly and energetic mascot. It was then in 1991 that Monte was developed. Monte debuted at the start of the 1993 season. In his first game as mascot, the Grizzlies came back to win after a 31-point deficit against South Dakota.

== Costume and Performance ==
The person behind the mask is typically chosen by the university athletics' Assistant Marketing Director, in an auditioning process informally known as Monte Idol. An unwritten rule keeps the current Monte's real identity secret until he or she is no longer enrolled in the university, at which point another Monte is chosen. There are usually two students with the role of Monte during any given year, to ensure Monte will always be available. Though the job is unpaid, the occupant does receive a tuition waiver. Most notable of the costume-wearers was Barry Anderson, who wore the Monte suit for five years in the 2000s and went on to work for the Chicago Bulls' mascot team.

In the beginning of Monte's life, the costume was heavier and poorly ventilated. The head was secured by only a small strap and was too tight on the performer's head. Scott Stiegler, the first university student to don the costume full-time, developed a bicycle helmet with foam around it to affix the head of the costume more efficiently. Peripheral vision was still compromised, and Monte could occasionally be seen tripping over bleachers and small children during the first few games. While visibility has been improved, Monte still must feel his way around with his hands to avoid tripping.

Monte has a variety of different ways of entertaining crowds at sports games. A marked departure from previous mascots, Monte is considerably acrobatic, doing flips and cartwheels to celebrate favorable gameplay. He frequently interacts with children, something previous mascots were unable to do because of their bulky costume or frightening appearance. The philosophy is that Monte must remain unpredictable, always surprising fans. Monte has been known to enter games on motorcycles, four-wheelers and horseback, always surrounded by cheerleaders. His effect on crowd energy and team performance has been enormously positive. In the 13 years after Monte started entertaining audiences at games, the Grizzly football team had won more games than they had in the 25 years prior.

Monte averages around 200 public appearances per year, with only around 50 of those being in sports arenas. As such, he is more than the athletics mascot and has been regarded as a mascot for the university as a whole. The university has used Monte to spread school spirit at birthday parties, weddings, corporate functions, and even funerals. Local businesses have featured Monte in their advertisements, and his likeness is used to help incoming freshmen with "Ask Monte," an online Q&A service on the university's website. In 2008, he starred in the children's book "The Great Monte Mystery," written by university alum Jennifer Newbold.

== National exposure ==
Monte has been nominated as Capital One's Mascot of the Year five times, winning in 2002 and 2004. The contest features 15 or more nominees pitted against each other, one at a time, with users and judges voting on their favorite of each match-up. The winner is the last standing. Nominees win $5,000 for their school; winners receive an additional $5,000 and are featured in a broadcast of an NFL game. Monte is the only mascot to have won twice.

Since then, he was featured in a Super Bowl commercial with Joe Montana.
