= 1947 Tangerine Bowl =

American college football game

| Catawba Indians | Maryville Scots |
| (9–2) | (9–0) |
| North State; Intercollegiate Conference |
| 31 | 6 |
| Head coach: Gordon Kirkland | Head coach: Lombe Honaker |
| | 1 | 2 | 3 | 4 | Total |
|---|---|---|---|---|---|
| Catawba | 0 | 18 | 7 | 6 | 31 |
| Maryville | 0 | 0 | 0 | 6 | 6 |
- Date: January 1, 1947
- Season: 1946
- Stadium: Greater Orlando Stadium
- Location: Orlando, Florida
- Attendance: 9,000

The 1947 Tangerine Bowl was an American college football bowl game played after the 1946 season, on January 1, 1947, at Greater Orlando Stadium in Orlando, Florida. The game was the inaugural playing of the Tangerine Bowl, now known as the Citrus Bowl, and saw the Catawba Indians defeat the Maryville Scots, 31–6.

== Game summary ==
Program cover for 1947 game

The first quarter of the game saw no scoring, while the second quarter saw Catawba find the end zone three times (11-yard pass, 6-yard rush, and a 35-yard interception return), though all three extra point attempts failed and the game went to halftime 18–0 Catawba.

Catawba found the end zone again in the third quarter, on a 10-yard rush. The third quarter ended 25–0.

The fourth quarter saw Catawba find the end zone one last time, on a 20-yard pass. Maryville scored for the first time in the game. Both extra point attempts failed, and the game finished 31–6 to Catawba.
