= 1948 Tangerine Bowl =

American college football game

Marshall Thundering Herd	Catawba Indians
(9–2)	(10–1)
Independent	North State; Intercollegiate Conference
0	7
Head coach: Cam Henderson	Head coach: Gordon Kirkland
	1	2	3	4	Total
Marshall	0	0	0	0	0
Catawba	0	0	0	7	7
- Date: January 1, 1948
- Season: 1947
- Stadium: Tangerine Bowl
- Location: Orlando, Florida
- Favorite: Catawba by 13
- Attendance: 9,000

The 1948 Tangerine Bowl was an American college football bowl game played after the 1947 season, on January 1, 1948, at the Tangerine Bowl stadium in Orlando, Florida. The game was the second annual Tangerine Bowl, now known as the Citrus Bowl, and featured the Catawba Indians against the Marshall Thundering Herd.

== Background ==
Catawba had appeared in the first Tangerine Bowl and beat Maryville College 31–6. This season, they were invited back to the bowl with a 10–1 record after having only one loss (to VMI) early in the season, and entered the game with an 8-game winning streak. They participated in the North State Intercollegiate Conference. Marshall was an Independent who was 9–2 on the year in Cam Henderson's tenth season as coach.

== Game summary ==
Indians’ fullback Lee Spears scored on a one-yard carry late in the fourth quarter to win the game. Despite outgaining Catawba in yards, 109–54, Marshall turned the ball over three times, which cost them the game. End Don Gibson for Marshall was named MVP of the game.

== Scoring summary ==
Scoring summary

Quarter	Time	Drive			Team	Scoring information	Score	
Quarter	Time	Plays	Yards	TOP	Team	Scoring information	MC	CC
4	4:30	12	45		CC	Lee Spears 1-yard touchdown run, Lamar Dorton kick good	0	7
"TOP" = time of possession. For other American football terms, see Glossary of American football.							0	7

== Aftermath ==
Marshall joined the Ohio Valley Conference the following year, and would not win a bowl game until the 1998 Motor City Bowl. Catawba was the first Tangerine Bowl participant to have a shutout win, and the first to win consecutive bowls. Their head coach Gordon Kirkland retired after the game; Catawba has not yet played in another bowl game.
