= Jim Johnson (coach) =

American college sports coach and administrator

- Johnson pictured in The Tecoan 1947, ECU yearbook

Biographical details
- Born: September 10, 1912; Cary, North Carolina, U.S.
- Died: November 27, 2004 (aged 92); Virginia Beach, Virginia, U.S.

Playing career

Football
- 1933–1937: East Carolina
- Position: Tackle

Coaching career (HC unless noted)

Football
- 1946–1948: East Carolina

Basketball
- 1946–1947: East Carolina

Head coaching record
- Overall: 8–18–1 (football); 17–10 (basketball)

James Archie Johnson Jr. (September 10, 1912 – November 27, 2004) was an American football, basketball, and baseball player, coach, and college athletics administrator. He was tapped to reintroduce men's sports to East Carolina after World War II. He was the seventh head coach of the football, basketball and baseball teams at East Carolina Teachers College. He also was the athletic director for all sports teams. Before coaching, Johnson was a 16 letter winning athlete between 1933 and 1937. Johnson was inducted in 1978 into the ECU Hall of Fame.

== "12th Man Tackle" ==
In October 1977, William & Mary met heavily favored East Carolina University in the Oyster Bowl. In the third quarter ECU led by three points. With 3:15 left in the third quarter, William & Mary quarterback Tom Rozantz broke loose and ran for the end zone. Jim Johnson, described by The Virginian Pilot as "a portly 65-year-old gentleman in a raincoat", ran from the sidelines and threw a block tackle on Rozantz before he could score the winning touchdown. The unusual turn of events silenced the screaming William & Mary fans, and the officials gathered to discuss their course of action. After deliberation, the play was ruled a touchdown.

== Head coaching record ==
=== Football ===
Year	Team	Overall	Conference	Standing	Bowl/playoffs
East Carolina Pirates (Independent) (1946)
1946	East Carolina	5–3–1			
East Carolina Pirates (North State Conference) (1947–1948)
1947	East Carolina	3–6	1–3	8th	
1948	East Carolina	0–9	0–6	9th	
East Carolina:		7–17–1	1–9		
Total:		7–17–1			
