= Gordon Kirkland =

American sports coach (1904–1953)

Biographical details
- Born: July 26, 1904; Durham, North Carolina, U.S.
- Died: June 23, 1953 (aged 48); Salisbury, North Carolina, U.S.

Coaching career (HC unless noted)

Football
- 1929: Oxford HS (NC)
- 1930–1933: Salisbury HS (NC)
- 1934–1948: Catawba

Basketball
- 1934–1936: Catawba
- 1942–1945: Catawba

Baseball
- 1935–1948: Catawba

Administrative career (AD unless noted)
- 1929–1930: Oxford HS (NC)
- 1930–1934: Salisbury HS (NC)
- 1934–1953: Catawba

Head coaching record
- Overall: 106–32–7 (football); 60–37 (basketball); 179–70–3 (baseball)
- Bowls: 2–0

Accomplishments and honors

Championships
- Football; 6 North State (1938, 1940, 1942, 1945–1947)

Gordon Ashby Kirkland (July 26, 1904 – June 23, 1953) was an American football, basketball, and baseball coach and college athletics administrator. He served as the head football coach at Catawba College in Salisbury, North Carolina from 1934 to 1948, compiling a record of 106–32–7. Kirkland also had two stints as the head basketball coach at Catawba, from 1934 to 1936 and 1942 to 1945, tallying a mark of 60–37, and was the school's head baseball coach from 1934 to 1948, amassing a record of 179–70–3. He led the Catawba Indians football team to six North State Conference titles and consecutive bowl game victories, in the 1947 and the 1948 Tangerine Bowls.

A native of Durham, North Carolina, Kirkland was a graduate of Elon College. He was the athletic director and head coach at Oxford High School in Oxford, North Carolina, where he led the football team to the finals of the North Carolina class B state championship in 1929. Kirkland was hired in 1930 as the athletic director and head coach at Salisbury High School in Salisbury, North Carolina. In 1934, he was appointed athletic director and head coach of all major sports at Catawba.

Kirkland died on June 23, 1953, at his home in Salisbury, following two weeks of serious illness and several years of declining heath due to a heart and kidney condition. He is a member of the Catawba College Hall of Fame, the Salisbury Athletic Hall of Fame, and North Carolina Sports Hall of Fame.

== Head coaching record ==
=== Football ===
Year	Team	Overall	Conference	Standing	Bowl/playoffs
Catawba Indians (North State Conference) (1934–1948)
1934	Catawba	5–2–3	2–0–2	2nd	
1935	Catawba	8–2	3–1	T–2nd	
1936	Catawba	5–5	3–2	3rd	
1937	Catawba	8–2	3–2	3rd	
1938	Catawba	7–2–1	4–1	T–1st	
1939	Catawba	6–2–2	2–1–1	4th	
1940	Catawba	8–1	4–0	1st	
1941	Catawba	8–3	4–1	2nd	
1942	Catawba	9–2	4–0	1st	
1943	No team—World War II				
1944	Catawba	6–3	NA	NA	
1945	Catawba	10–1	2–0	T–1st	
1946	Catawba	10–2	5–0	1st	W Tangerine
1947	Catawba	11–1	6–0	1st	W Tangerine
1948	Catawba	5–4–1	5–2	3rd	
Catawba:		106–32–7	47–10–3		
Total:		106–32–7			
National championship Conference title Conference division title or championship game berth
