= Joetown, Marion County, West Virginia =

Joetown
- Unincorporated community
- Location within the state of West Virginia Joetown (the United States)
- Coordinates: 39°27′47″N 80°24′27″W
- Country: United States
- State: West Virginia
- County: Marion
- Elevation: 1,017 ft (310 m)
- Time zone: UTC-5 (Eastern (EST))
  - Summer (DST): UTC-4 (EDT)
- GNIS ID: 1540946

Joetown is an unincorporated community in Marion County, West Virginia, United States.
