= The Stanford Jonah =

Song
- Written: 1913
- Published: 1913
- Genre: Fight song
- Songwriter: Ted E. Haley

"The Stanford Jonah" is a fight song of the University of California, Berkeley written in 1913 by Ted Haley as an entry into a song contest held by the Daily Californian. The song gained popularity when the campus glee club traveled to Europe where the song was a hit. It continues to be a hit at most sporting events, but specifically at events between the California Golden Bears and their rival, the Stanford Cardinal. Georgia Tech's "White And Gold", The Naval Academy's "Up With The Navy", and the University of Montana's "Up With Montana" share this tune as well.

== Controversy and explanation ==
There is a small controversy about the chorus of this song. In 1914, the University of Montana says that they originated this part with their fight song, "Up With Montana." The U.S. Naval Academy has the written permission of the University of Montana to use this song under the name "Up With The Navy." The Georgia Institute of Technology claims this song, with adapted lyrics, under the name of "Up with the White and Gold" as their rivalry Fight song against the University of Georgia. Both the Georgia Institute of Technology and the University of California claim the song as their own. "Up with the White and Gold" was printed in the 1915 Blue Print, the Georgia Institute of Technology's school yearbook. It is unknown where the tune originated or how it spread between the two universities.

== Lyrics ==
When the training days are done,
And the Big Game's just begun,
And there's music in the air;
When our team runs on the field,
Stanford knows her fate is sealed,
For the Golden Bear has left his lair.

When the yells of lusty throats
Start to getting Stanford's goats,
And the rooting section seems a howling mob,
Then you grab your hat and shout,
You let folks know you're about,
For you know that Stanford Jonah's on the job.

Chorus:
So then it's up with the Blue and Gold,
Down with the Red; red, red, red
California's out for a victory,
We'll drop our battle axe on Stanford's head; chop!
When we meet her, our team will surely beat her.
Down on the Stanford farm, there'll be no sound,
When our Oski rips through the air.
Like our friend Mister Jonah, Stanford's team will be found,
In the tummy of the Golden Bear.

Chorus

=== Lyric references ===
- The battle axe referred to is the Stanford Axe which is a perpetual football trophy with a history of being stolen.
- The Big Game referred to is the Big Game (football) which pits the California Golden Bears against the Stanford Cardinal in one of the most celebrated college rivalries.
- The Oski that rips through the air refers to an old cheer used by the Golden Bears at football games called "The Oski Yell" that has since been abandoned, but Oski is now the university mascot.
- "We'll drop our battle axe on Stanford's head, chop!" refers to Stanford's previous mascot the Indians, which was later deemed culturally insensitive in 1972, and changed to the Stanford Tree in subsequent years.
