= 1947 Marshall Thundering Herd football team =

American college football season

1947 Marshall Thundering Herd football

Tangerine Bowl, L 0–7 vs. Catawba
- Conference: West Virginia Intercollegiate Athletic Conference
- Record: 9–3 (1–0 WVIAC)
- Head coach: Cam Henderson (10th season)
- Captains: Charlie Snyder; Chasey Wilson
- Home stadium: Fairfield Stadium

1947 West Virginia Intercollegiate Athletic Conference football standings
| | Conf. | | | | | Overall |
| Team | W | | L | | T | W | | L | | T |
|---|---|---|---|---|---|---|---|---|---|---|
| Potomac State $ | 6 | – | 0 | – | 2 | 6 | – | 1 | – | 2 |
| West Liberty State | 3 | – | 0 | – | 1 | 8 | – | 0 | – | 2 |
| Fairmont State | 4 | – | 1 | – | 0 | 4 | – | 3 | – | 1 |
| West Virginia Tech | 4 | – | 2 | – | 0 | 0 | – | 5 | – | 3 |
| Davis & Elkins | 4 | – | 3 | – | 0 | 4 | – | 4 | – | 0 |
| West Virginia Wesleyan | 3 | – | 2 | – | 0 | 6 | – | 2 | – | 0 |
| Morris Harvey | 3 | – | 3 | – | 0 | 4 | – | 5 | – | 0 |
| Salem | 2 | – | 3 | – | 0 | 3 | – | 5 | – | 0 |
| Glenville State | 2 | – | 5 | – | 1 | 5 | – | 3 | – | 0 |
| Concord | 0 | – | 5 | – | 1 | 1 | – | 6 | – | 1 |
| Shepherd | 0 | – | 6 | – | 1 | 0 | – | 6 | – | 1 |
| Marshall * | 1 | – | 0 | – | 0 | 9 | – | 3 | – | 0 |
| Bethany (WV) * | 0 | – | 2 | – | 0 | 0 | – | 8 | – | 0 |
$ – Conference champion; * – Did not qualify for conference standings Ties did not count in conference standings.

The 1947 Marshall Thundering Herd football team was an American football team that represented Marshall University as a member of the West Virginia Intercollegiate Athletic Conference during the 1947 college football season. In its tenth season under head coach Cam Henderson, the Thundering Herd compiled a 9–3 record, lost to Catawba in the 1948 Tangerine Bowl and outscored opponents by a total of 342 to 125. Marshall had a record of 0–1 against WVIAC opponents, but did not play enough conference games to qualify for the WVAC standings. Charlie Snyder and Chasey Wilson were the team captains.

Marshall was ranked at No. 97 (out of 500 college football teams) in the final Litkenhous Ratings for 1947.

The team played its home games at Fairfield Stadium in Huntington, West Virginia.

== Schedule ==
| Date | Opponent | Site | Result | Attendance | Source |
|---|---|---|---|---|---|
| September 20 | Steubenville* | Fairfield Stadium; Huntington, WV | W 60–6 | | |
| September 27 | Morehead State* | Fairfield Stadium; Huntington, WV | W 38–12 | | |
| October 4 | at Eastern Kentucky* | Richmond, KY | W 7–6 | | |
| October 11 | Canisius* | Fairfield Stadium; Huntington, WV | L 20–25 | | |
| October 18 | at Evansville* | Evansville, IN | W 24–0 | | |
| October 25 | Indiana State* | Fairfield Stadium; Huntington, WV | W 33–0 | | |
| November 1 | Saint Vincent* | Fairfield Stadium; Huntington, WV | W 39–6 | | |
| November 8 | Murray State* | Fairfield Stadium; Huntington, WV | W 41–20 | | |
| November 15 | at Xavier* | Corcoran Stadium; Cincinnati, OH | L 7–18 | 8,000 | |
| November 22 | Bradley*^{†} | Fairfield Stadium; Huntington, WV | W 33–19 | | |
| November 27 | Morris Harvey | Fairfield Stadium; Huntington, WV | W 40–6 | | |
| January 1 | vs. No. 20 Catawba* | Tangerine Bowl; Orlando, FL (Tangerine Bowl) | L 0–7 | 9,000 | |
*Non-conference game; ^{†}Homecoming; Rankings from AP Poll released prior to the game

== Team players drafted in the NFL ==
The following players were selected in the 1948 NFL draft.

| Player | Position | Round | Pick | Franchise |
| Charlie Snyder | Tackle | 21 | 193 | Pittsburgh Steelers |
