= Shuford Stadium =

Stadium in North Carolina, United States

Coordinates: 35°41′32″N 80°29′10″W

Shuford Stadium is a 4,500-capacity stadium located in Salisbury, North Carolina. It is home to Catawba College, who play in the South Atlantic Conference.

The stadium was built in 1925 but has been upgraded several times since. The field is named for former coach Gordon Kirkland, and the athletics track is named for Charlotte area philanthropist Irwin Belk.
