= Up with Montana =

"Up With Montana"

Song
- Published: 1914
- Genre: Fight song
- Composer: disputed
- Lyricist: Dick Howell

"Up With Montana" is the fight song of the University of Montana. Its lyrics are credited to Dick Howell, a law student and member of the glee club in the 1910s, who wrote them in 1914 “to commemorate the rivalry” for the 21st meeting between the University of Montana and its rival Montana State University, then known as State University of Montana and Montana College of Agriculture and Mechanic Arts respectively. Referencing the song's final stanza, "And the squeal of the pig will float on the air; from the tummy of the Grizzly Bear", The New York Times commented that "at the University of Montana, fans expect their team to devour its enemies while still alive." Despite the reference, eight months earlier in January 2002, the song was read aloud on the Senate floor by Sen. Fritz Hollings (S. Carolina) as part of a friendly bet with Montana's Senator Max Baucus over who would win the NCAA I-AA Football Championship that year.

Though the song was copyrighted by "ASUM, State University of Montana" in 1929 the origin of the tune itself is disputed. "The Stanford Jonah" of the University of California, Berkeley, Georgia Tech's "Up With the White and Gold" and The Naval Academy's "Up With The Navy" (which gives credit to the University of Montana) also share a similar tune. "The Stanford Jonah" was written in 1913 by Ted Haley as an entry into a song contest held by the Daily Californian and is the oldest of the group. The song continues to be a hit at most sporting events of the school, but specifically at events between the California Golden Bears and their rival, the Stanford Cardinal. Given the relative age and similarities between the songs as well as the unlikelihood of Montana and Georgia Tech crossing paths, it is likely that both "Up With Montana" and "White and Gold" are derived from "The Stanford Jonah."

The Stanford Jonah (1913)

So then it's up with the Blue and Gold,
Down with the Red; red, red, red
California's out for a victory,
We'll drop our battle axe on Stanford's head; chop
When we meet her, our team will surely beat her.
Down on the Stanford farm, there'll be no sound,
When our Oski rips through the air.
Like our friend Mister Jonah, Stanford's team will be found,
In the tummy of the Golden Bear.

Up With Montana (1914)

Up with Montana, boys,
Down with the foe,
Old Montana's out for a victory;
She'll shoot her backs around the foe-men's line;
A hot time is coming now, oh, brother mine.
Up with Montana, boys, down with the foe.
Good old Grizzly'll triumph today;
and the squeal of the pig will float on the air;
from the tummy of the Grizzly bear.

White and Gold (1916)

Oh well it's up with the White and Gold,
Down with the Red and Black,
Georgia Tech is out for a victory.
We'll drop the battle-axe on Georgia 's head,
When we meet her our team is sure to beat her.
Down on the old farm there will be no sound
Till our bow-wows rip through the air;
When the battle is over Georgia's team will be found
With the Yellow Jackets swarming around!

== Lyrics ==
The original lyrics written above are taken from the University of Montana's website. However, a slightly modified version is more common today and is the version adopted by the Montana Grizzlies football team after a victory. This alternative version alters the fourth and fifth lines.

Alternative:

Up with Montana, boys,
Down with the foe,
Good ol' Grizzlies out for a victory;
We'll shoot our backs 'round the foeman's line;
Hot time is coming now, oh, brother mine.
Up with Montana, boys, down with the foe,
Good old Grizzlies triumph today;
and the squeal of the pig will float on the air;
from the tummy of the Grizzly Bear.

Both versions of the song retain the oft-discussed "and the squeal of the pig will float on the air from the tummy of the Grizzly bear.” Some interpret the "pig" floating on the air as referring to a football (i.e. pigskin) being thrown. A second and more likely explanation is that "pig" refers to rival Montana State University (MSU) toward whom the song was originally directed. MSU was known as the Montana College of Agriculture and Mechanic Arts at the time and it was not uncommon for the Grizzlies to refer to them as farmers. Hence, pigs. Eaten by grizzlies. Similarly, "The Stanford Jonah" ends with "Like our friend Mister Jonah, Stanford's team will be found, in the tummy of the Golden Bear."

In the early 1990s the University of Montana Marching Band would sing an alternate version the second time through: Grizz ly fightsonggrizz, ly, fight song grizz ly, fight song grizz ly fight song grizz lyfightsong; Grizz ly fight song grizz ly fight song grizz ly; fight song grizz lyfight song grizz lyfight song. Hey! Grizz ly fightsonggrizz, ly, fight song grizz ly, fight song grizz ly fightsong grizzly; fight song grizz ly fight song grizz ly fight song grizz ly; fight song grizzly fight song Grizzly fight!

It is notable that each "grizzly" matches with "Grizzlies" in the original lyrics as well as how the rhythm works to end the first half and begin the second.
