= Barton Bulldogs football =

College football team

- First season: 1920; 106 years ago (Note: The team was dissolved after the 1930 season, and the college did not field a football program from 1931 to 1945. Then it was reinstated, playing for the next five years (1946–1950), but it was discontinued once again. From 1951 to 2019, Barton did not have a football team, it was re-launched in 2020; 6 years ago.)
- Athletic director: Ken Tyler
- Head coach: Chip Hester; 5th season, 20–29 (.408)
- Location: Wilson, North Carolina
- Field: Truist Stadium
- NCAA division: Division II
- Conference: South Atlantic Conference
- Colors: Royal blue and black
- All-time record: 20–29 (.408)
- Mascot: Bulldogs
- Website: bartonbulldogs.com

The Barton Bulldogs football team represents Barton College in college football at the NCAA Division II level. Barton is a member of the South Atlantic Conference (SAC). The Bulldogs play their home games at Truist Stadium in Wilson, North Carolina. The team's head coach is Chip Hester, who took over the position in 2019.

== Year-by-year results ==
National champions	Conference champions	Bowl game berth	Playoff berth

Season	Year	Head Coach	Association	Division	Conference	Record							Postseason	Final ranking
Season	Year	Head Coach	Association	Division	Conference	Overall			Conference				Postseason	Final ranking
Season	Year	Head Coach	Association	Division	Conference	Win	Loss	Tie	Finish	Win	Loss	Tie	Postseason	Final ranking
Atlantic Christian College
1920	1920	Casey Blackburn	NCAA	–	–	2	7	0					—	—
1921	1921	Casey Blackburn	NCAA	–	–								—	—
1922	1922	Casey Blackburn	NCAA	–	–								—	—
1923	1923	Filo Pearce	NCAA	–	–								—	—
1924	1924	Filo Pearce	NCAA	–	–								—	—
1925	1925	Filo Pearce	NCAA	–	–								—	—
1926	1926	Filo Pearce	NCAA	–	–								—	—
1927	1927	Peahead Walker	NCAA	–	–	6	1	1					—	—
1928	1928	T. L. Anthony	NCAA	–	–	1	7	0					—	—
1929	1929	T. L. Anthony	NCAA	–	–	2	4	1					—	—
1930	1930	T. L. Anthony	NCAA	–	CC	1	7	0		0	5	0	—	—
No team from 1931 to 1945
1946	1946	M.J. Bird	NCAA	–	CC	1	4	1					—	—
1947	1947	Robert Spangler	NCAA	–	CC	0	8	0	9th	0	5	0	—	—
1948	1948	Robert Spangler	NCAA	–	CC	2	7	0	8th	1	6	0	—	—
1949	1949	Bill Crutchfield	NCAA	–	CC	1	7	2		0	5	2	—	—
1950	1950	Bill Crutchfield	NCAA	–	CC	2	7	0		0	5	5	—	—
No team from 1951 to 2019
Barton Bulldogs
2020	2020	Chip Hester	NCAA	Division II	Independent	1	4	0					—	—
2021	2021	Chip Hester	NCAA	Division II	Independent	6	5	0					—	—
2022	2022	Chip Hester	NCAA	Division II	SAC	4	7	0	5th (Piedmont)	3	6	0	—	—
2023	2023	Chip Hester	NCAA	Division II	SAC	6	5	0	4th (Piedmont)	3	5	0	—	—
2024	2024	Chip Hester	NCAA	Division II	SAC	3	8	0	5th (Piedmont)	2	6	0	—	—
